= Ridwan =

Ridwan may refer to:

- Riḍwan, the keeper of paradise in Islam
- Ridwan (name), an Arabic given masculine name
  - Radwan (name), a list of people that includes Ridwan
- Ridwan (place) or Redwan, a place and a Yazidi principality in the Ottoman Empire
- Ridwan dynasty, a Dynastic family in the Ottoman Empire
- Ridván (Arabic: Riḍwán), a Bahai festival

== See also ==
- Ridvan, a given name
- Rizvan, a given name
- Rizwan (disambiguation)
