= Rizwan =

Rizwan (Arabic: رضوان) is an Arabic name and surname.

It may refer to:

- Riḍwan, also spelled Rezwan or Rizwan, the angel in charge of maintaining Jannah or Paradise in Islam

== Athletes ==
- Rizwan Akram (born 1979), a Dutch cricket umpire and former player
- Rizwan Asif (born 1990), a Pakistani football player
- Rizwan Azam (born 1985), a Pakistani badminton player
- Rizwan Cheema (b. 1978), a Pakistani-Canadian cricket player
- Rizwan Latif (born 1973), a Pakistani-born United Arab Emirates cricket player
- Rizwan Mahmood (born 1989), a Danish cricket player
- Rizwan Tanweer, an Italian cricket player

=== Pakistani cricket players ===
- Rizwan Ahmed (cricketer, born 1976) (born 1976), a Pakistani cricket player
- Rizwan Akbar (b. 1986), a Pakistani cricket player
- Rizwan Ali (b. 1999), a Pakistani cricket player
- Rizwan Haider (b. 1985), a Pakistani cricket player
- Rizwan Hussain (cricketer) (b. 1996), a Pakistani cricket player
- Rizwan Malik (b. 1990), a Pakistani cricket player
- Rizwan Saeed (cricketer) (b. 1978), a Pakistani cricket player
- Rizwan-uz-Zaman (b. 1961), a former Pakistani cricket player

== Entertainment and media ==
- Rizwan Butt, a Pakistani singer-songwriter
- Rizwan Ali Jaffri (born 1992), a Pakistani model, actor and singer
- Rizwan Khan (born 1962), a British broadcaster
- Rizwan Manji (born 1974), a Canadian actor
- Rizwan-ul-Haq (born 1965), a Pakistani musician
- Rizwan Wasti (1937–2011), a Pakistani broadcaster
- Mawaan Rizwan (born 1992), a Pakistani-born British actor, writer and comedian
- Rizwan, a character played by Arash DeMaxi on the TV series The Irrational

== Politics and civil service ==
- Rizwan Akhtar, a retired Pakistan Army general
- Rizwan Arshad (born 1979), an Indian politician for the Indian National Congress party
- Rizwan Ahmad Khan (born 1940), and Indian politician for the Peace Party of India
- Rizwan Zaheer (born 1965), an Indian politician for the Bahujan Samaj Party

== Other people ==
- Rizwan Ahmed (disambiguation)
- Rizwan Farook (1987-2015), a Pakistani - American domestic terrorist
- Rizwan Hussain (born 1973), a Bangladeshi-born British human rights lawyer
- Rizwanur Rahman (1977–2007), an Indian victim of a suspicious death
- Ramzan Rizwan (1989-2018), Pakistani tissue seller and murderer

== Other uses ==
- Rizwan, Iran, a village in Iran
- Rizwan Mosque, in Portland, Oregon
- Rizwan Ilyasi, fictional terrorist in the 2019 Indian film War, portrayed by Mashhoor Amrohi and Sanjeev Vatsa

== See also ==
- Ridwan (disambiguation)
- Muhammad Rizwan (disambiguation)
- Rizwan-Muazzam, a Pakistani musical group
- Ridvan
