= Ridwan (name) =

Arabic masculine given name

- Gender: Male

Origin
- Meaning: “Favor, approval, goodwill, satisfaction, pleasure”

Other names
- Related names: Redwan, Rizwan, Rezwan, Rejwan, Redoan, Rilwan, Riswan

Ridwan (Arabic: رِضْوَان riḍwān) is an Arabic masculine given name meaning "favor, pleasure, goodwill". In post-10th-century Islamic tradition, Ridwan is the name of an angel in charge of guarding the gates of Paradise, Jannah.

== Variants ==
Other forms of Ridwan include "Rizwan", "Rizvan", and "Ridvan" or "Rıdvan" in Albanian, Bosnian, Indonesian, Kashmiri, Malay, Pashto, Persian, Punjabi, Tajik, Turkish, Urdu, and other languages heavily influenced by Arabic directly, or through Persian or Turkish.

The only two variants used in Albanian are Ridvan and Rizvan.

In Bangladesh, the name may be spelled as "Rizwan", "Rezwan", "Rejwan" or "Redwan". It may also be transliterated as Redhwan, Redwhan or Redwan.

In Brunei, Indonesia, and Malaysia it is alternatively spelled as "Ridwan", "Riduan", and "Ridhwan". "Redouane" is the most common spelling in French.

The female equivalent of this name is "Ridwana" or "Rizwana".

== See also ==
- Ridwan (angel)
