= Radwan =

Radwan may refer to:

== People ==
- Radwan (name) and Redwan, People with the name and surname
- Fakhr al-Mulk Radwan, Seljuk ruler of Aleppo from 1095 to 1113.
- Ridwan dynasty, dynastic family that governed Gaza and various provinces throughout the Ottoman Empire between the 16th-17th centuries

== Places ==
- Radwan, Łódź Voivodeship, a village in central Poland
- Radwan, Lesser Poland Voivodeship, a village in south Poland
- Radwan, Świętokrzyskie Voivodeship, a village in south-central Poland
- Sheikh Radwan, neighborhood in Gaza

== Military ==
- Radwan coat of arms, Polish knights' clan and coat-of-arms
- Radwan Force, Hezbollah's special forces

== See also ==
- Radvaň (disambiguation)
