= Radhouane =

Radhouane (Arabic: رضوان) is a masculine North African given name, a Francized form of Arabic Ridwan, which means "satisfaction". Notable people with the given name include:

- Radhouane Ben Ouanès (born 1980), Tunisian footballer
- Radhouane Charbib (born 1968), Tunisian man recognized as the world's tallest man from 1998 to 2005
- Radhouane Chebbi (born 1986), Tunisian Greco-Roman wrestler
- Radhouane Salhi (born 1967), Tunisian footballer
- Radhouane Slimane (born 1980), Tunisian basketball player

== See also ==
- Redouane, another Francized form of Ridwan
