= Riḍwan =

Angel in Islam

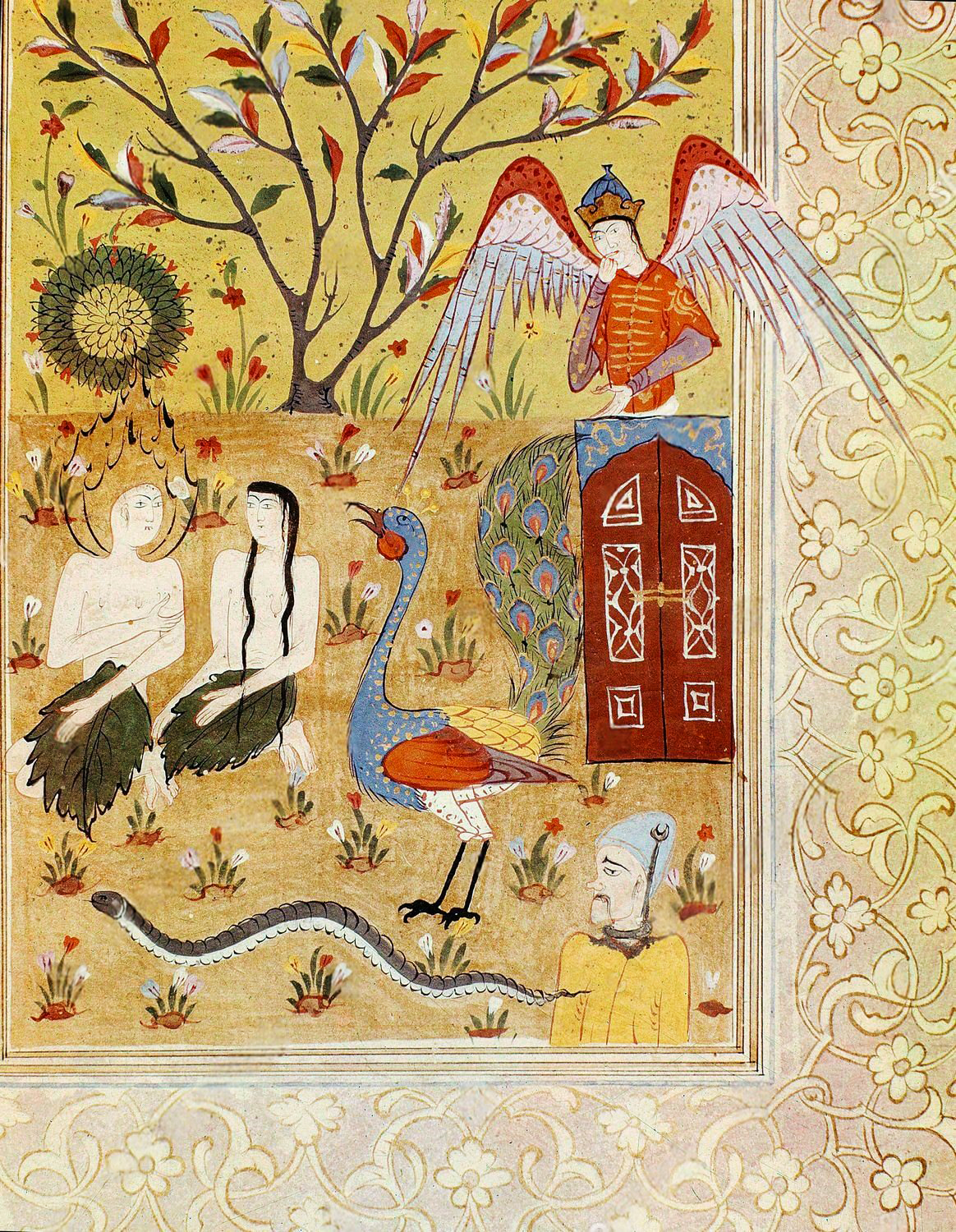
Persian miniature depicting the expulsion of Adam and Eve, observed by an angel above the doors of the Garden, the Serpent, the Peacock, and Iblis. This angel likely is Ridwan.

Riḍwān (or Rızvan , Arabic: رضوان), is an angel in Islam, who guards the gates of the garden. The name Riḍwān likely derives from a late personifying exegetical reading of the common Quran’ic term “riḍwān” meaning “favor/goodwill”; which is used when speaking about the garden in Qur’an 3:15 “riḍwānun minna Allah” meaning “favor from God”. The first extant mentions of his name being that of the angel still named Ismāʿīl by Ibn Hisham are found in 10th-century reports. From thereon this name has been a common feature of stories, reports, and exegesis particularly Mi'raj narrations. Ridwan also plays an important role as the guardian of heaven in the Qisas Al-Anbiya, here he must prevent Iblis from entering the keep of Adam, but was tricked by a serpent, who concealed Iblis in his mouth, carrying him past the guardian.

== See also ==
- List of angels in theology
- Gadreel
- Maalik
- Răzvan
- Rizvan
- Ridvan
