= Bou Inania Madrasa =

- المدرسة البوعنانية
- Main courtyard and minaret

General information
- Type: Madrasa, mosque
- Architectural style: Moorish (Marinid)
- Location: Fez, Morocco
- Coordinates: 34°03′43″N 4°58′58″W
- Named for: Sultan Abu Inan Faris
- Construction started: 28 December 1350
- Completed: 1355

Technical details
- Material: brick, cedar wood, stucco, tile
- Floor count: 2

The Bou Inania Madrasa or Bu 'Inaniya Madrasa (Arabic: المدرسة البوعنانية, romanized: al-madrasa ʾabū ʿinānīya) is a madrasa in Fez, Morocco, built in 1350–55 by the Marinid sultan Abu Inan Faris. It is the only madrasa in Morocco which also functioned as a congregational mosque. It is widely acknowledged as a high point of Marinid architecture and of historic Moroccan architecture generally.

The main building, located on the south side of Tala'a Kebira street, consists of a courtyard surrounded by galleries with student quarters built on the second floor above. The courtyard is also flanked by two classroom chambers and precedes a wide prayer hall. Thanks to its hybrid mosque status, it is also one of the only Moroccan madrasas with a prominent minaret. Much of the building is covered with high-quality decoration in carved stucco, zellij (mosaic tilework), and carved wood. Across the street, on the north side of Tala'a Kebira, is an ablutions facility (dar al-wuḍūʾ) as well as the Dar al-Magana, a structure whose street façade is occupied by an elaborate water clock.

== History ==
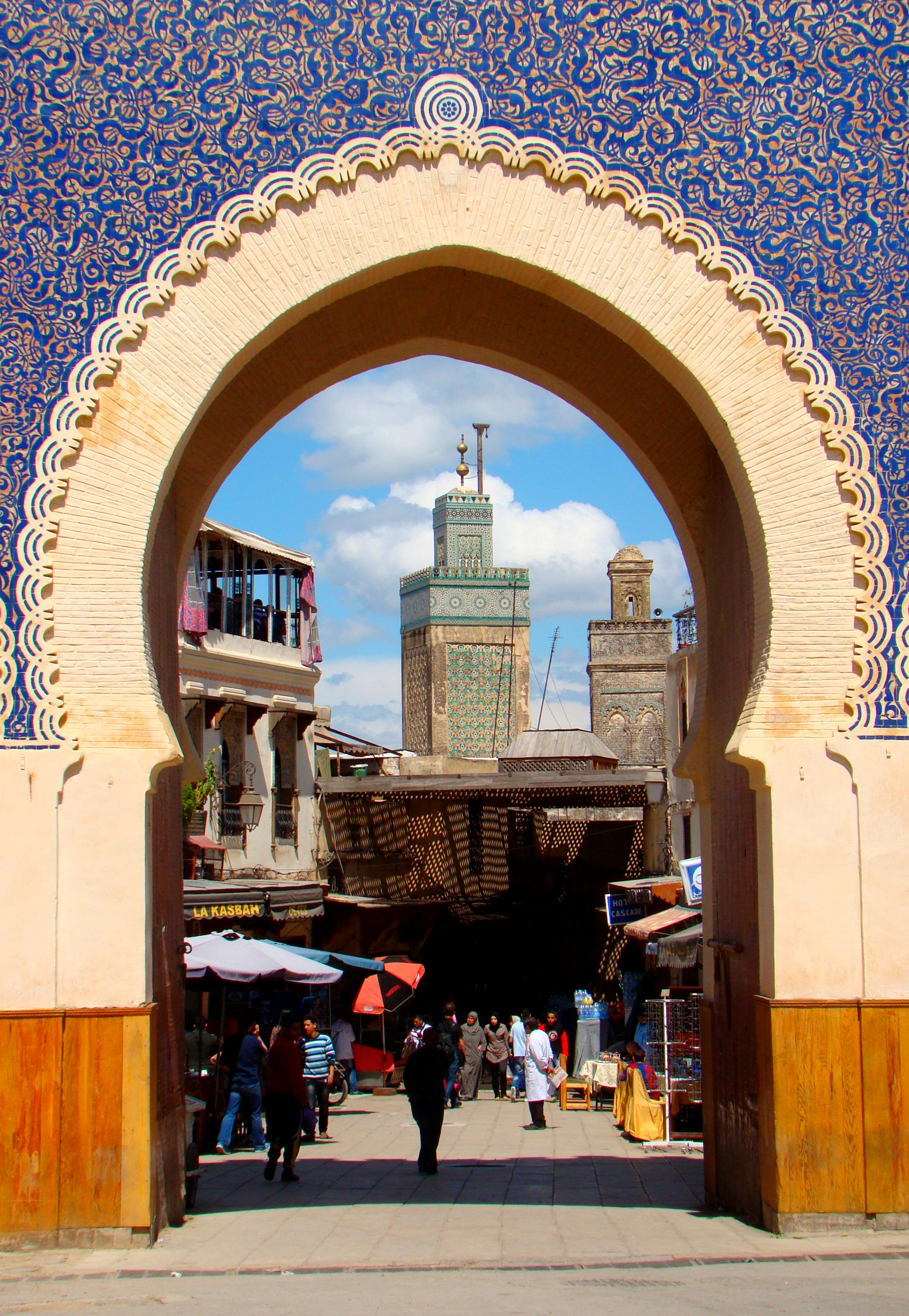
The minaret of the madrasa, seen through Bab Bou Jeloud

=== Founder and patron: Sultan Abu Inan ===
The name Bou Inania (Bū 'Ināniya) is derived from the name of its founder, the Marinid sultan Faris ibn Ali Abu Inan al-Mutawakkil (generally Abou Inan or Abu Inan for short). It was originally named the Madrasa al-Muttawakkiliya but the name Madrasa Bu Inania has been retained instead. He was the son and successor of Sultan Abu al-Hasan, under whose reign the Marinid empire reached its apogee and expanded all the way to Tunis in the east. Abu Inan, who rebelled against his father and declared himself sultan in 1348, did not manage to hold onto all these new eastern territories, but the Moroccan state was nonetheless prosperous during his reign. He was assassinated by his vizier on January 10, 1358, at the age of 31. His death marked the beginning of the dynasty's definitive decline, with subsequent Marinid rulers being mostly figureheads controlled by powerful viziers.

=== Context: the role of Marinid madrasas ===
The Marinids were prolific builders of madrasas, a type of institution which originated in northeastern Iran by the early 11th century and was progressively adopted further west. These establishments served to train Islamic scholars, particularly in Islamic law and jurisprudence (fiqh). The madrasa in the Sunni world was generally antithetical to more "heterodox" religious doctrines, including the doctrine espoused by the Almohad dynasty. As such, it only came to flourish in Morocco under the Marinid dynasty which succeeded the Almohads. To the Marinids, madrasas played a part in bolstering the political legitimacy of their dynasty. They used this patronage to encourage the loyalty of Fez's influential but fiercely independent religious elites and also to portray themselves to the general population as protectors and promoters of orthodox Sunni Islam. The madrasas also served to train the scholars and elites who operated their state's bureaucracy.

The Bou Inania Madrasa was the largest and most important madrasa created by the Marinid dynasty and turned into one of the most important religious institutions of Fez and Morocco. It was the only such madrasa to gain the status of congregational mosque or "Friday mosque", which meant that the Friday sermon (khutba) was delivered here like in the other most important mosques of the city. As a result, it was fully equipped with all the facilities of a major mosque and religious complex, in addition to extensive decoration. The architecture and decoration of the madrasa is also considered to be the culmination of this type of Marinid architecture.

=== Foundation and construction ===
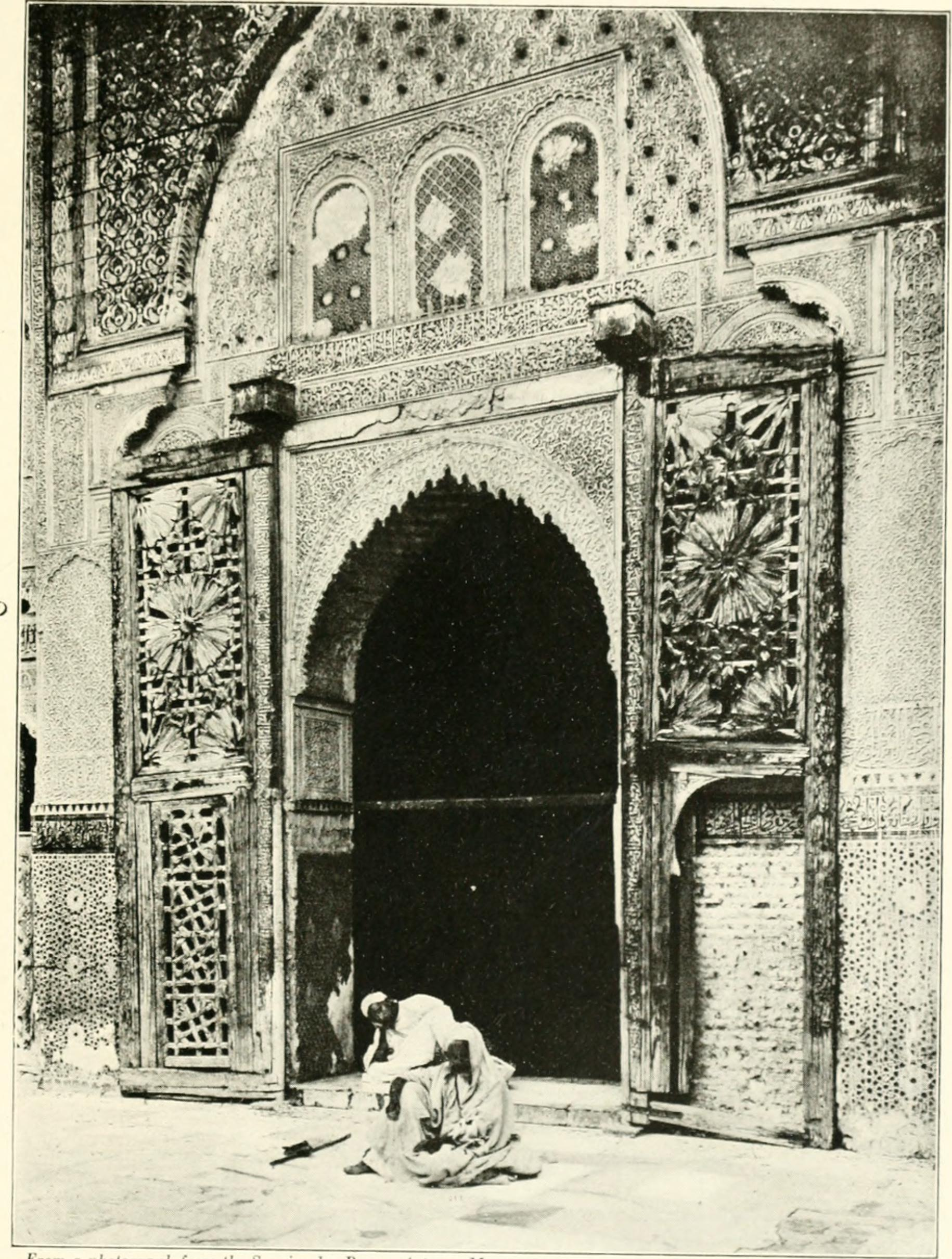
Entrance to one of the study rooms off the main courtyard, photographed in 1920

A number of apocryphal stories about the madrasa's creation exist. One reported story claims that Abu Inan felt guilt about his violent overthrow of his father (Sultan Abu al-Hasan) and gathered a number of religious scholars to advise him on how he could redeem himself and seek forgiveness from God (Allah). They advised him to choose a location in the upper city which then served as a garbage dump and to transform it into a site of religious learning; thus, by purifying and improving a part of the city, he would do the same for his conscience.

The foundation inscription of the building, located inside the prayer hall, indicates that construction on the madrasa started on December 28, 1350, CE (28 Ramadan 751 AH), and finished in 1355 (756 AH). The inscription also notes an extensive list of mortmain-type endowments (i.e. properties and other sources of revenue) which were dedicated to funding the madrasa's operations and which were part of its habous or waqf (an Islamic charitable trust).

The construction project was known to be highly expensive due to the scale and lavishness of the building. One apocryphal anecdote claims that the sultan, upon seeing the full cost of construction presented to him by nervous construction supervisors, ripped up the accounts book and threw it in the river, while proclaiming: "What is beautiful is not expensive, no matter how large the sum."

=== Later history and restorations ===
Despite Sultan Abu Inan's significant investments in the madrasa's architecture and its waqf endowment, it does not appear to have successfully rivaled the prestige and importance of the larger and older Qarawiyyin as a center of learning. It operated autonomously for some time but it's likely that after a couple of centuries the privilege of higher education in Fez was de facto centralized through the Qarawiyyin.

The madrasa building has undergone numerous restorations, particularly in the 17th century after a damaging earthquake. During the reign of Sultan Mulay Sliman (1792-1822), entire wall sections were reconstructed. In the 20th century, restorations were carried out on the madrasa's decorations.

== Architecture ==
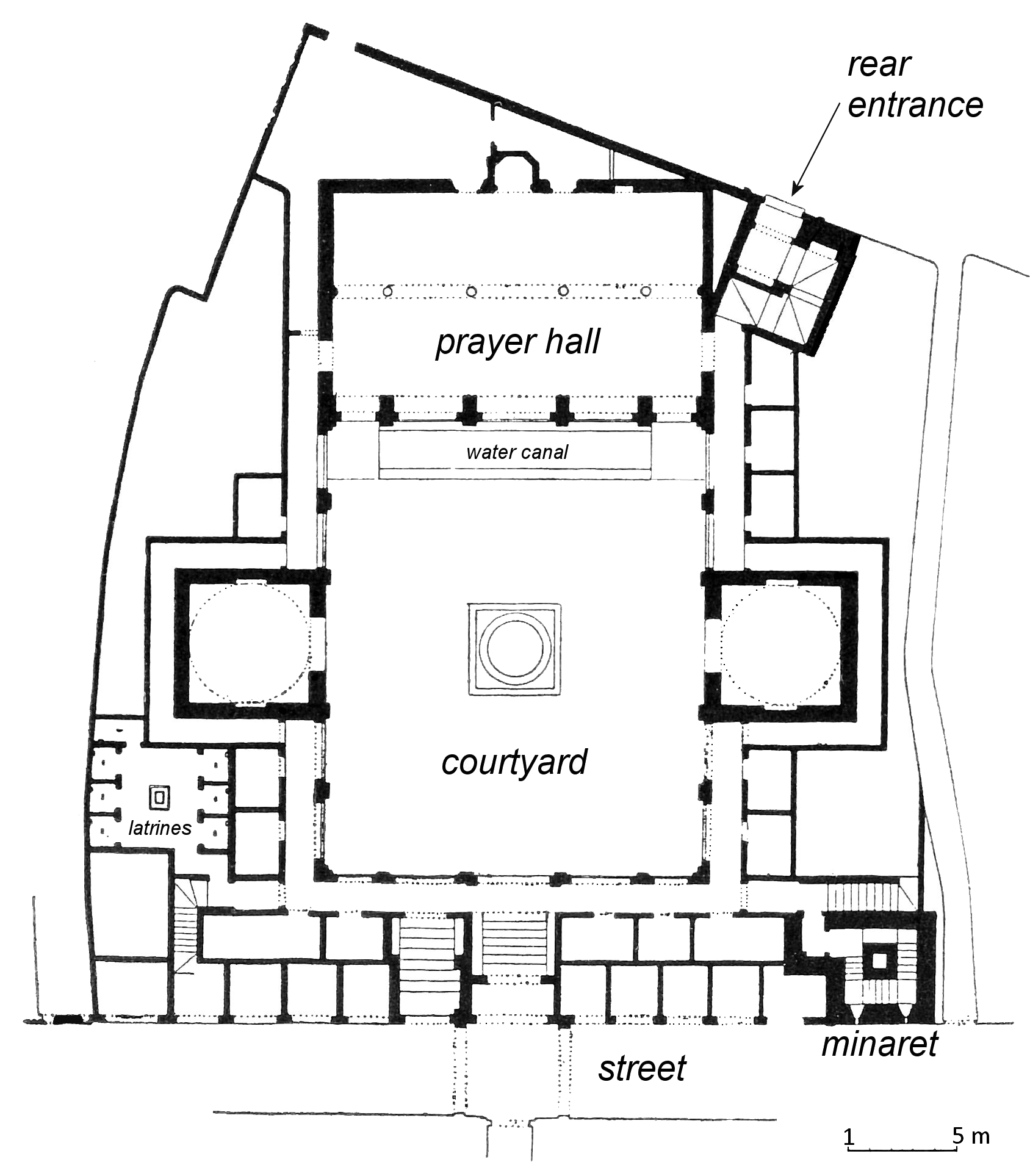
General floor plan of the madrasa (ground level)

The madrasa is actually a complex of buildings that together provide the facilities required to serve as a madrasa and mosque. The main building has the outline of an irregular rectangle measuring 34.65 by 38.95 metres. It is located between Tala'a Kebira and Tala'a Seghira, two of the most important streets of Fes el-Bali, and is aligned with what was then considered the qibla (direction of prayer), to the southeast. This main structure includes the study areas, the mosque or prayer hall area, living quarters for students, and an ablutions room. Directly across the street to the north is another, larger, ablutions house (dar al-wuḍūʾ) with latrines. Right next to this is the Dar al-Magana or "House of the Clock", which features a famous but currently non-functional hydraulic clock on its facade.

=== Entrances ===
The madrasa has two entrances: one on Tala'a Kebira street aligned with the mihrab and the central axis of the building, and another on Tala'a Seghira at the back. The Tala'a Kebira entrance has a horseshoe arch doorway surrounded by stucco decoration. A set of stairs leads into a vestibule and then directly into the main courtyard. The vestibule is covered in the same rich ornamentation as the rest of the madrasa and has a ceiling of cedar wood carved in elaborate muqarnas.

Another doorway to the left of the main entrance, known as Bab al-Ḥafa ('Door of the barefoot'), leads directly to the outer gallery of the main courtyard and from there gives direct access to the student rooms and to the ablutions room in the northeast part of the building. The vestibule of this entrance is covered by a barrel vault clad with stucco decoration featuring a star-like geometric motif. The nearby ablutions room is centered around a rectangular water basin and is surrounded by other small chambers.

The rear entrance, opening from Tala'a Seghira, leads via a bending corridor to the main courtyard. This entrance is marked by very fine decoration, including a carved wooden canopy situated above a panel of carved stucco decoration. Directly above the doorway is a wooden lintel carved with an Arabic inscription that names Abu Inan as the madrasa's founder. In this part of the building was also a Qur'anic school for children (similar to a kuttab).

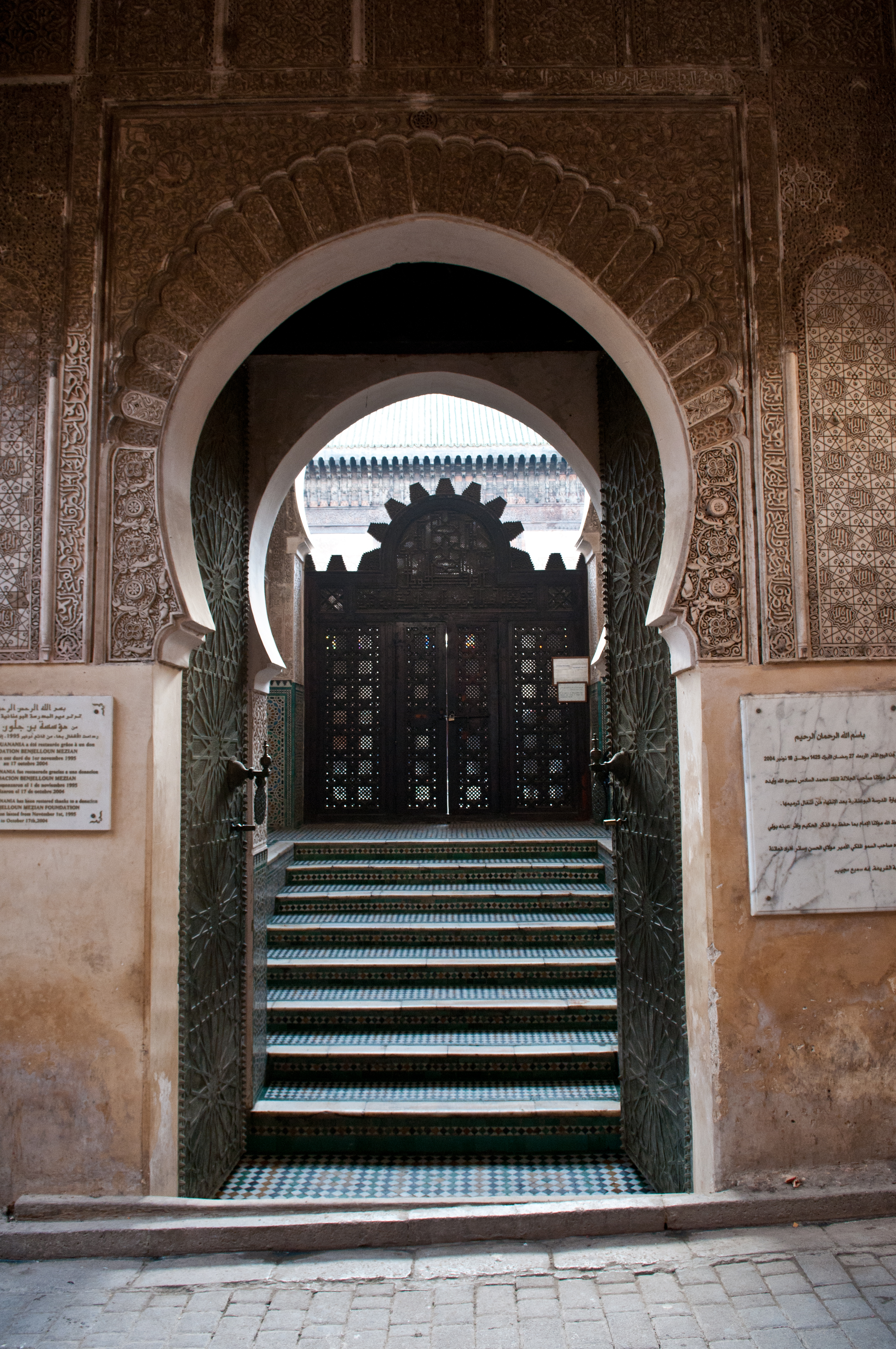
The main entrance on Tala'a Kebira street

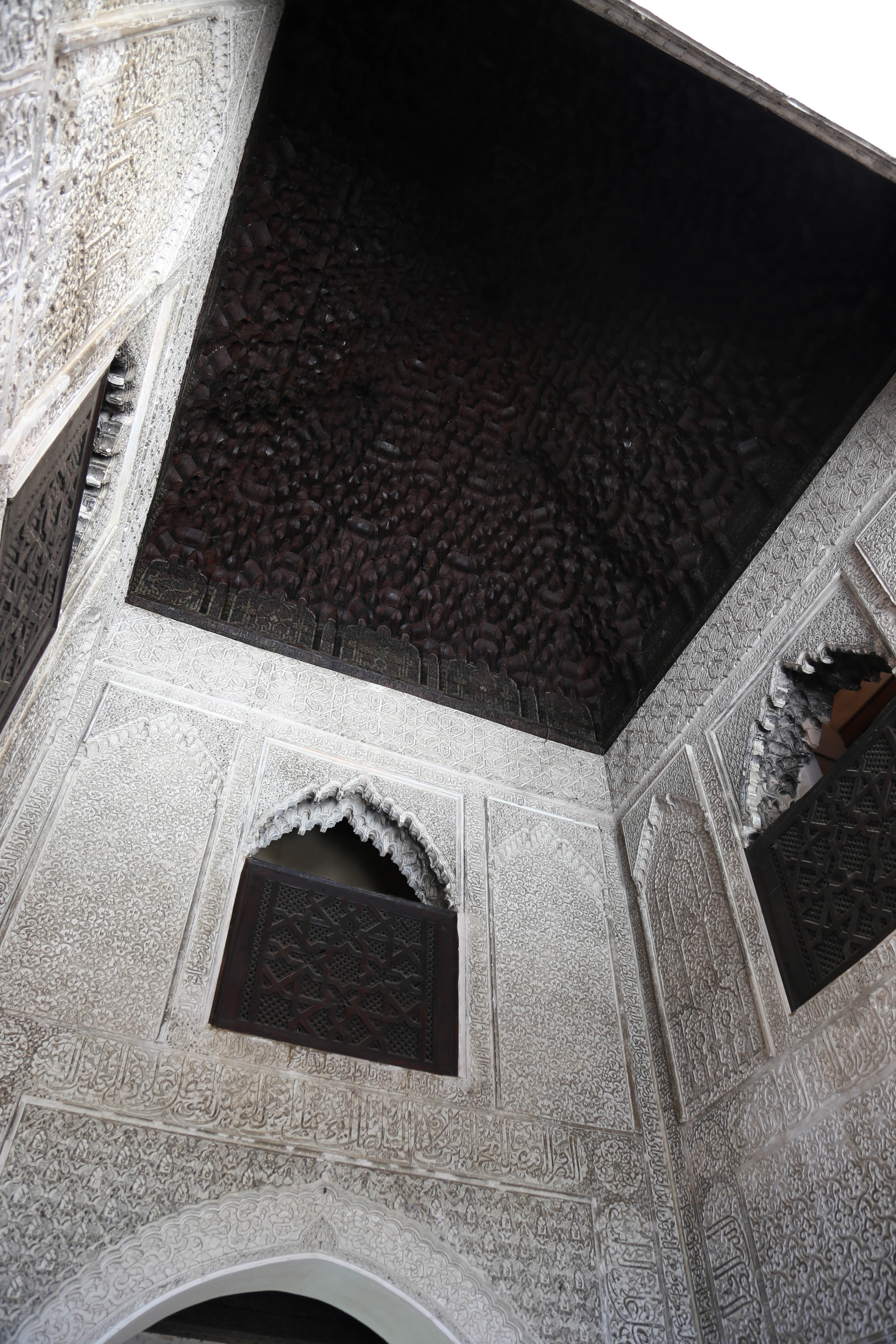
Vestibule of the madrasa (Tala'a Kebira entrance)

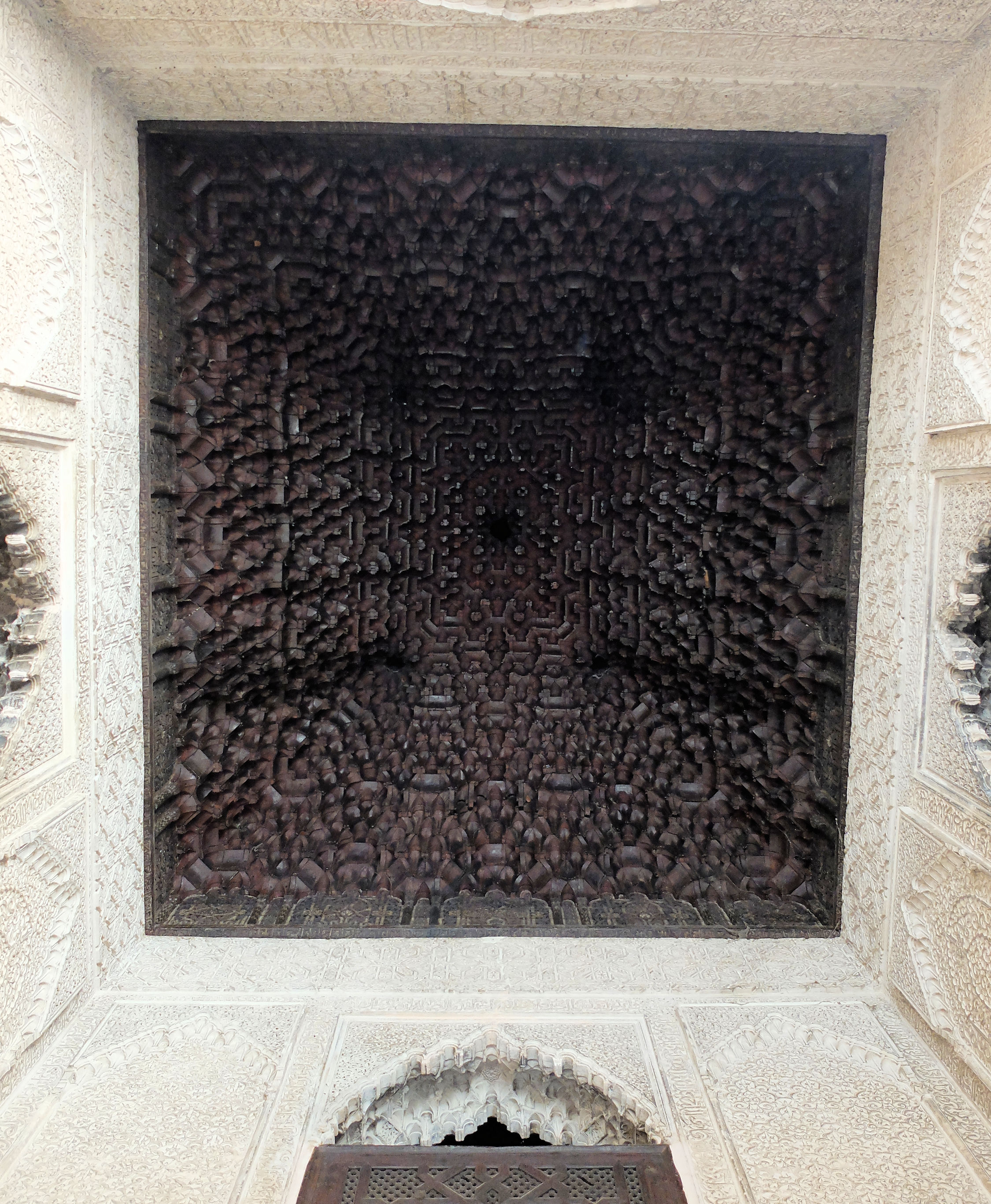
Wooden muqarnas ceiling over the vestibule

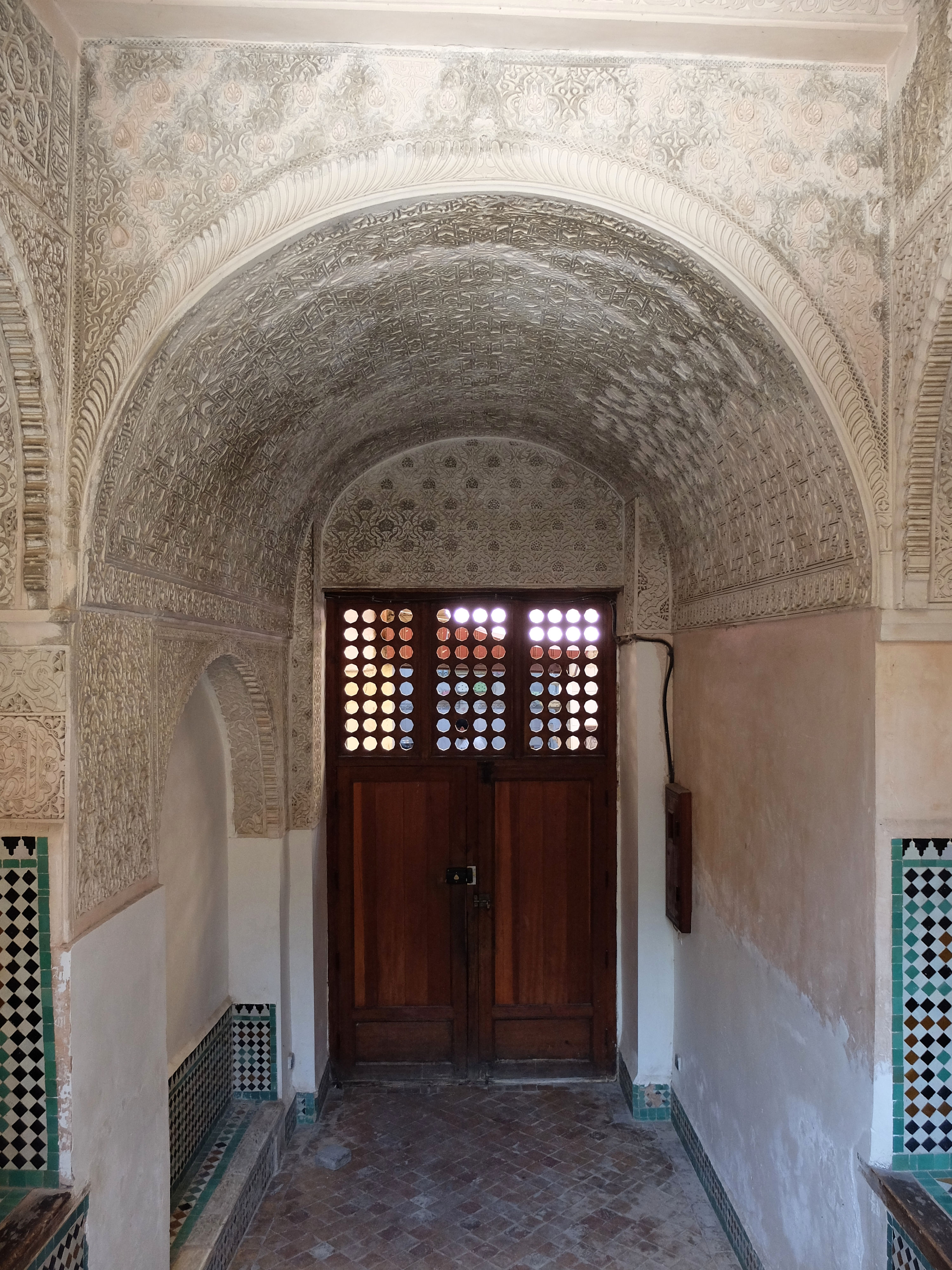
Bab al-Ḥafa, the secondary entrance from Tala'a Kebira

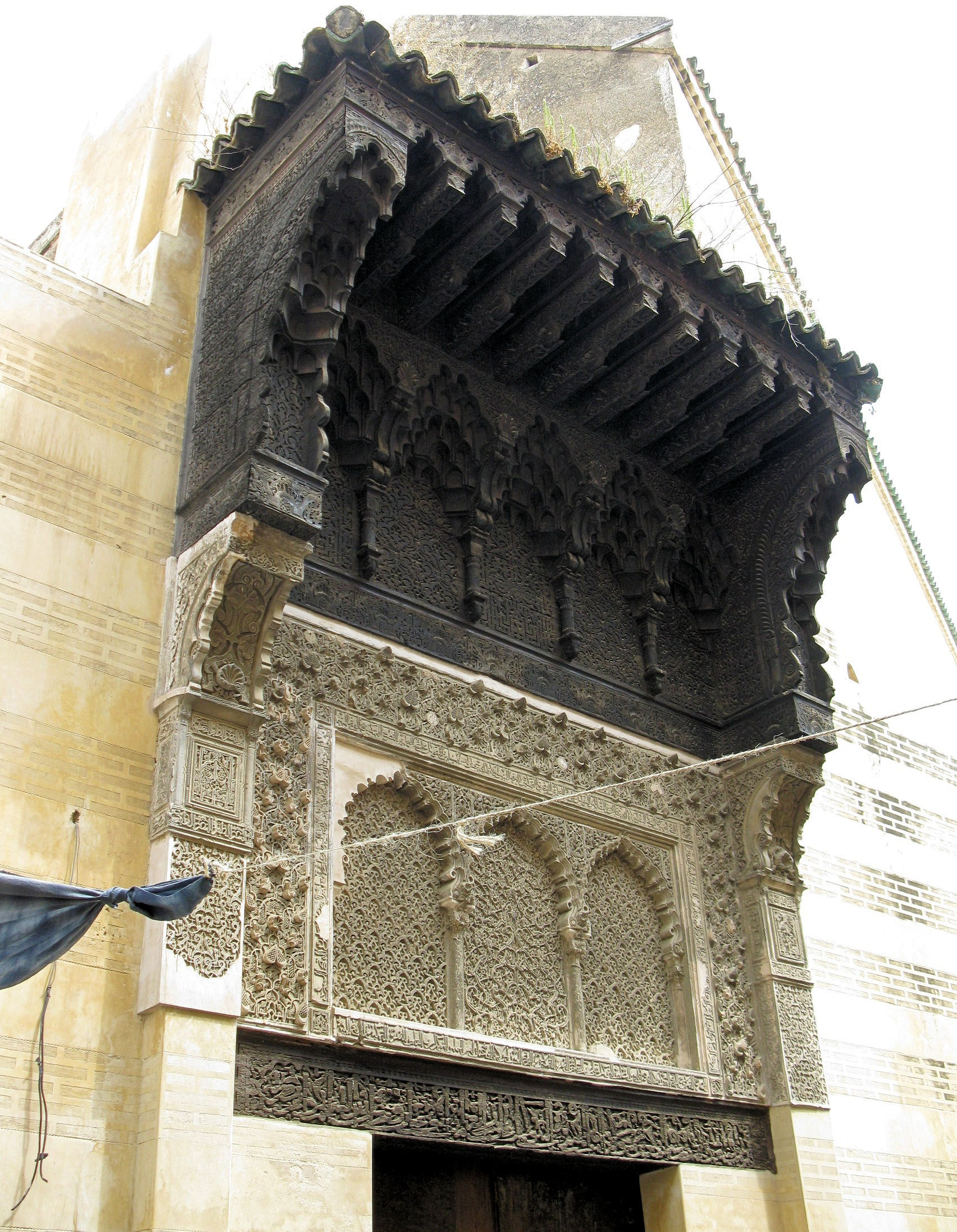
Decorative canopy over the rear entrance on Tala'a Seghira street

=== Main courtyard and adjoining chambers ===
The building is centered around a large rectangular marble-paved courtyard slightly deeper than it is wide. At its center is a fountain and basin to assist in ablutions, as is common in many mosque sahns. The courtyard is surrounded on three sides by a narrow gallery, partially hidden by wooden screens between the pillars that uphold the walls of the floor above. The passages of the gallery lead to other rooms, mostly living cells for the madrasa students, around the courtyard. At the northwestern and northeastern corners of the building are stairways that lead to an upper floor which is occupied by more living quarters for students, some of which have windows overlooking the courtyard.

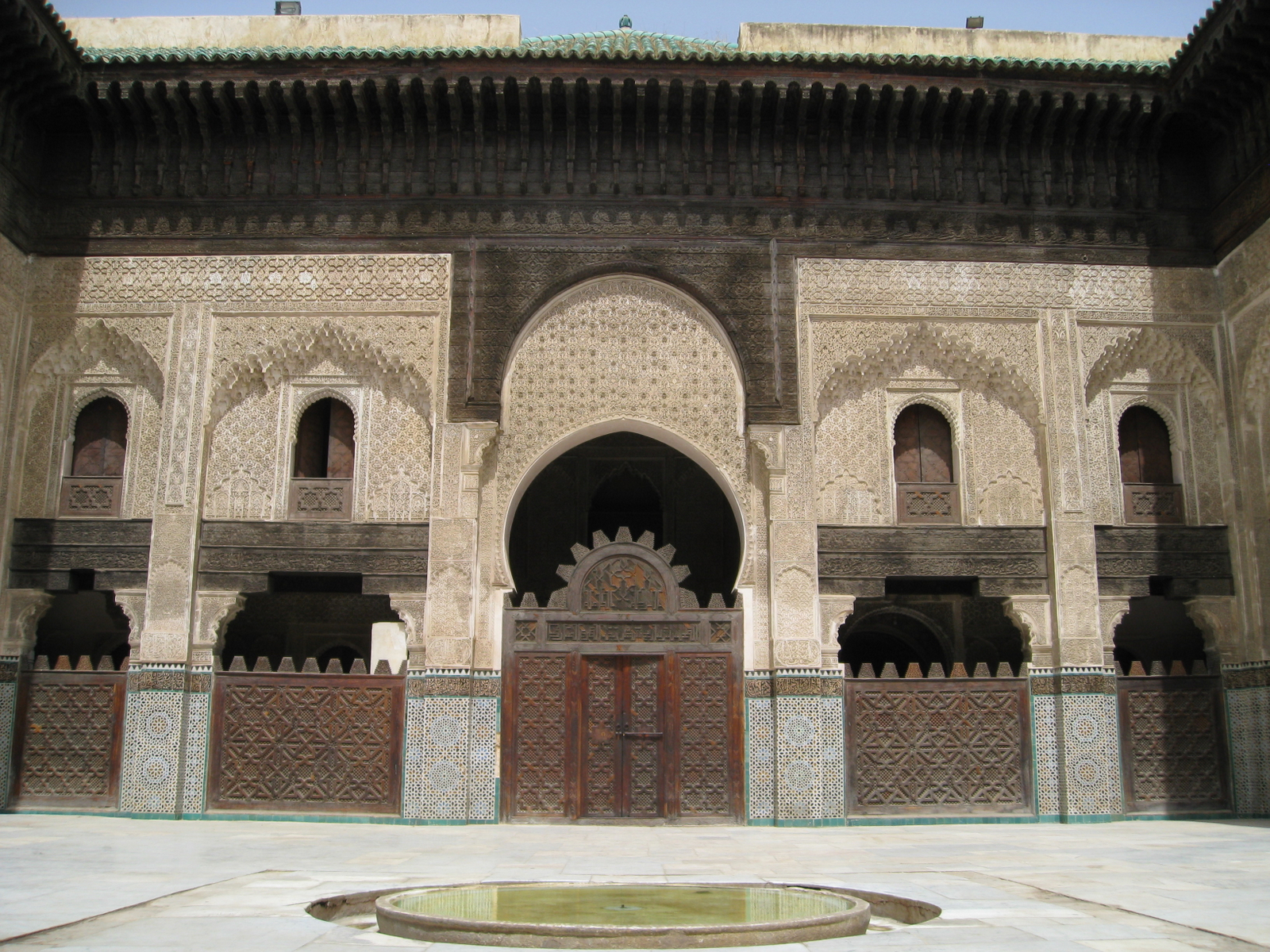
Courtyard, looking northwest towards the entrance

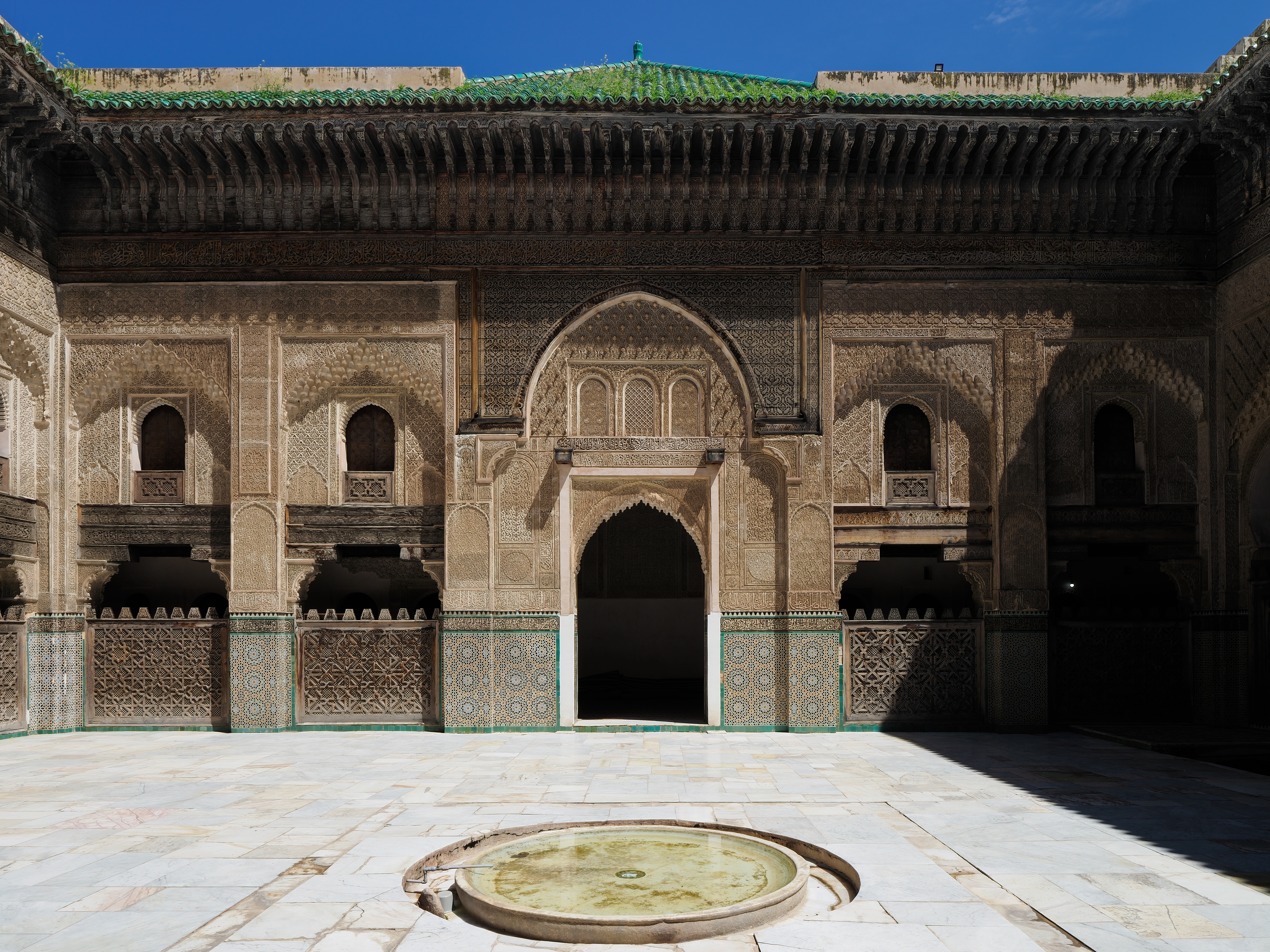
Courtyard, looking northeast towards one of the lateral study rooms

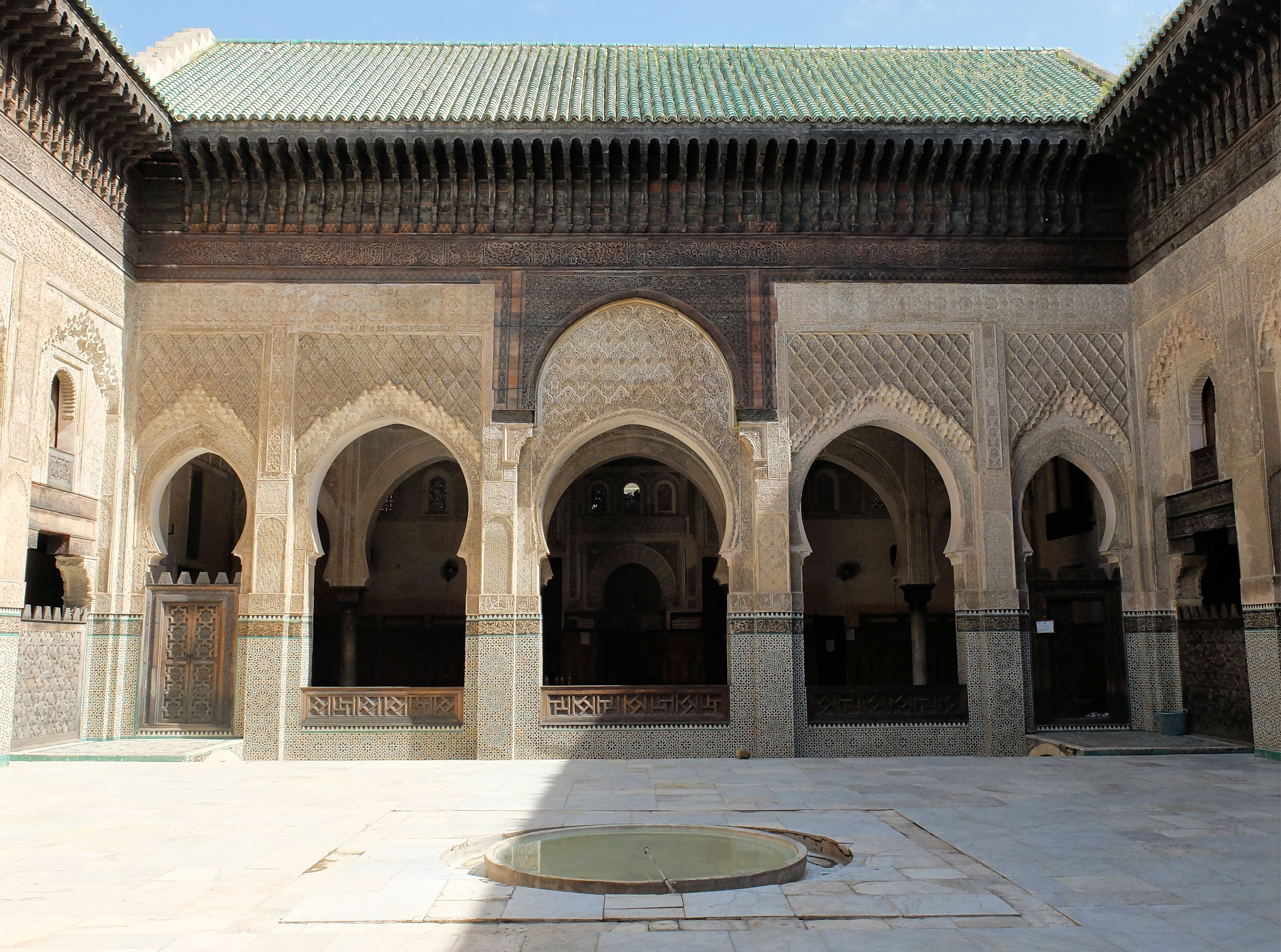
Courtyard, looking southeast towards the prayer hall

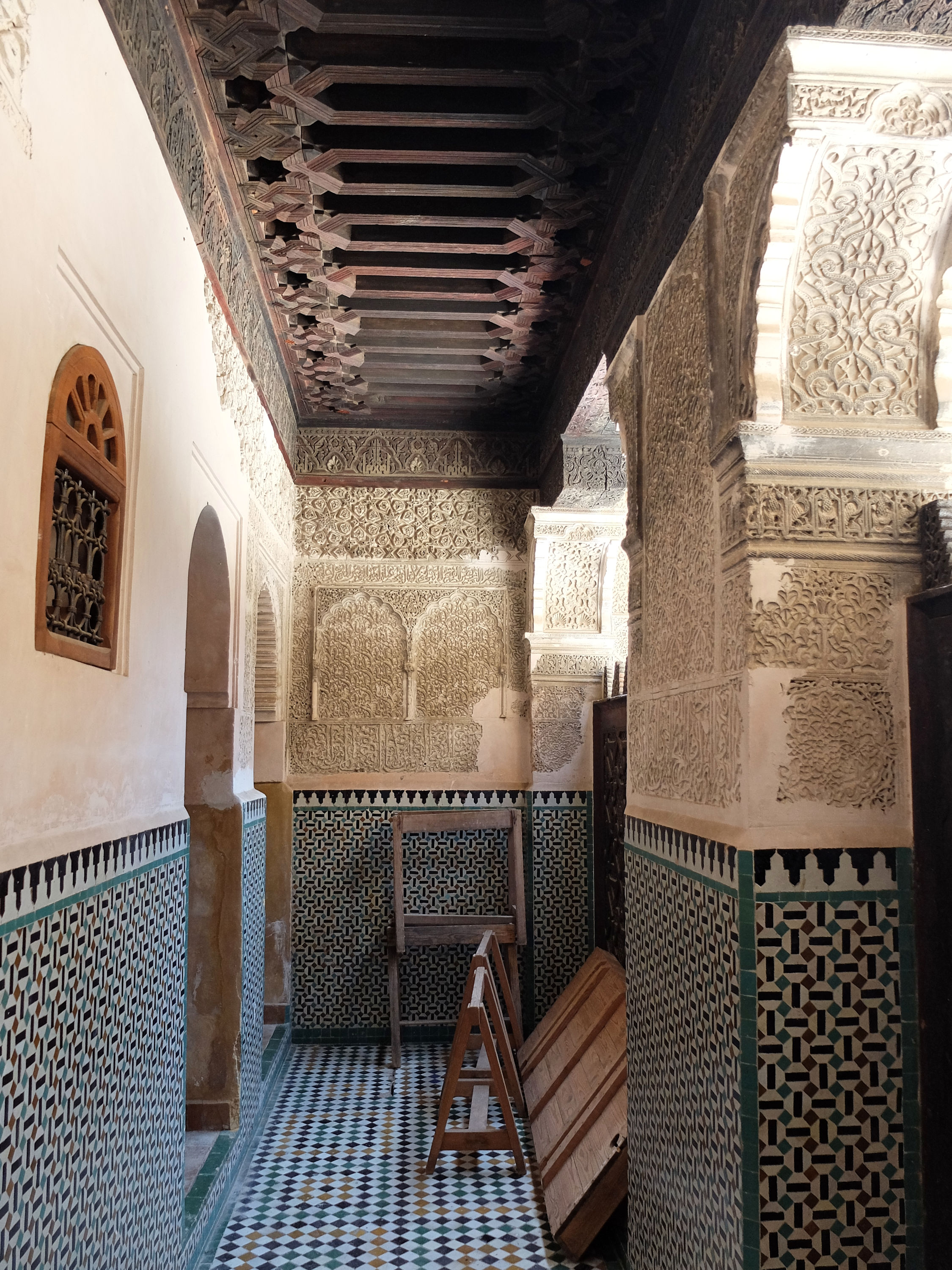
The gallery passage around the courtyard

On the east and west sides of the courtyard, aligned with the central fountain, are two large square chambers, measuring 5 metres per side, which served as classrooms. They are entered via archways with intricate muqarnas-carved intrados, which are guarded by tall cedar wood doors whose surfaces are finely carved with interlacing geometric star patterns with arabesque fillings as well as with bands of Arabic calligraphic inscriptions. Inside, the chambers are decorated with more stucco-carved surfaces and covered by wooden cupolas with a pattern of radiating ribs. These two lateral chambers have been compared with the iwans of classic madrasa architecture further east in Egypt, such as the Madrasa of Sultan Hassan in Cairo, leading to speculation that the architect was familiar with such models. The gallery passages that run around both sides of the courtyard also connect to corridors that go around the lateral chambers, allowing students from the surrounding rooms to walk directly from the madrasa entrance all the way to the prayer hall without passing through the courtyard, if desired.

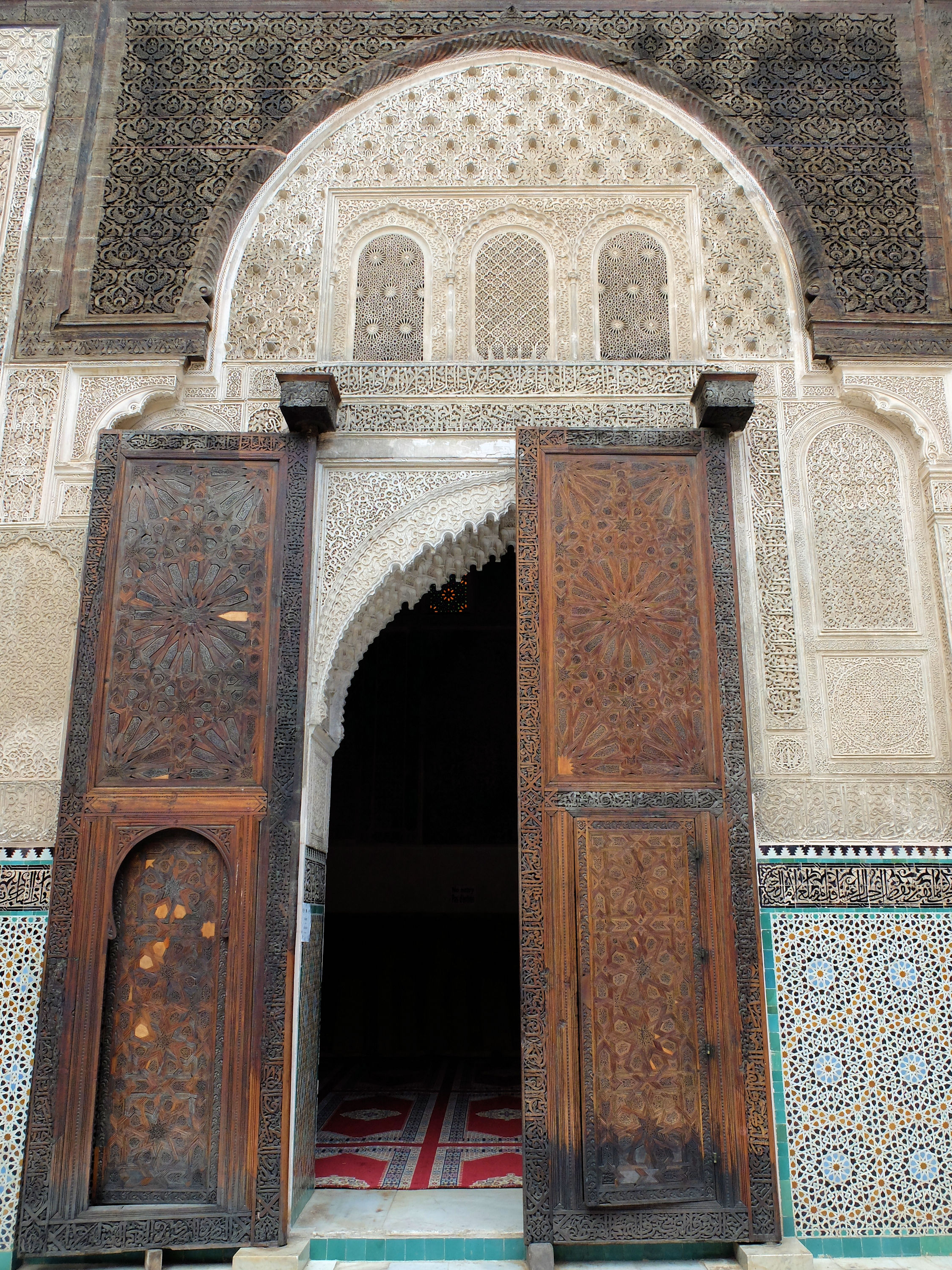
Doorways to one of the lateral study rooms

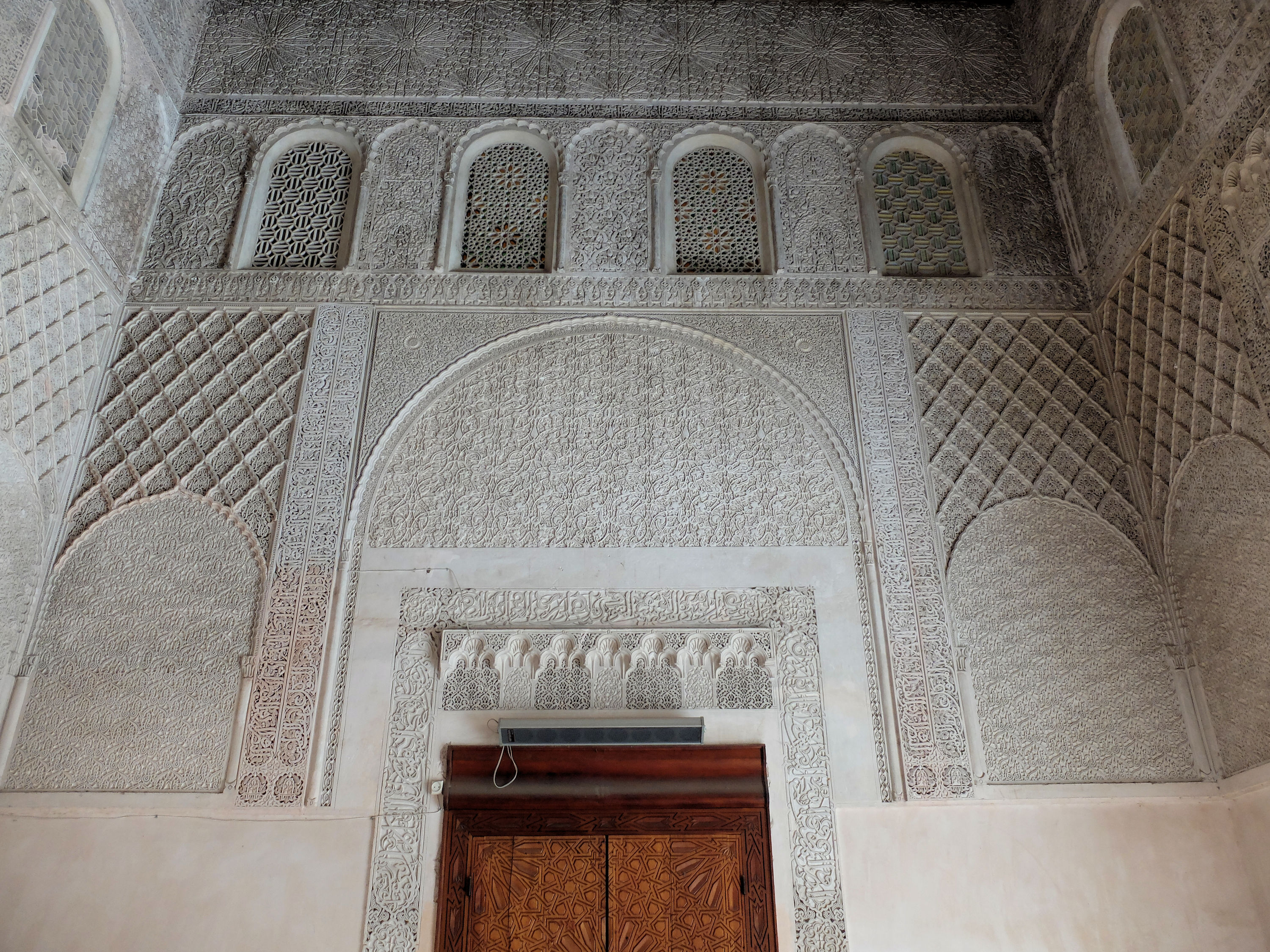
Interior of one of the lateral chambers

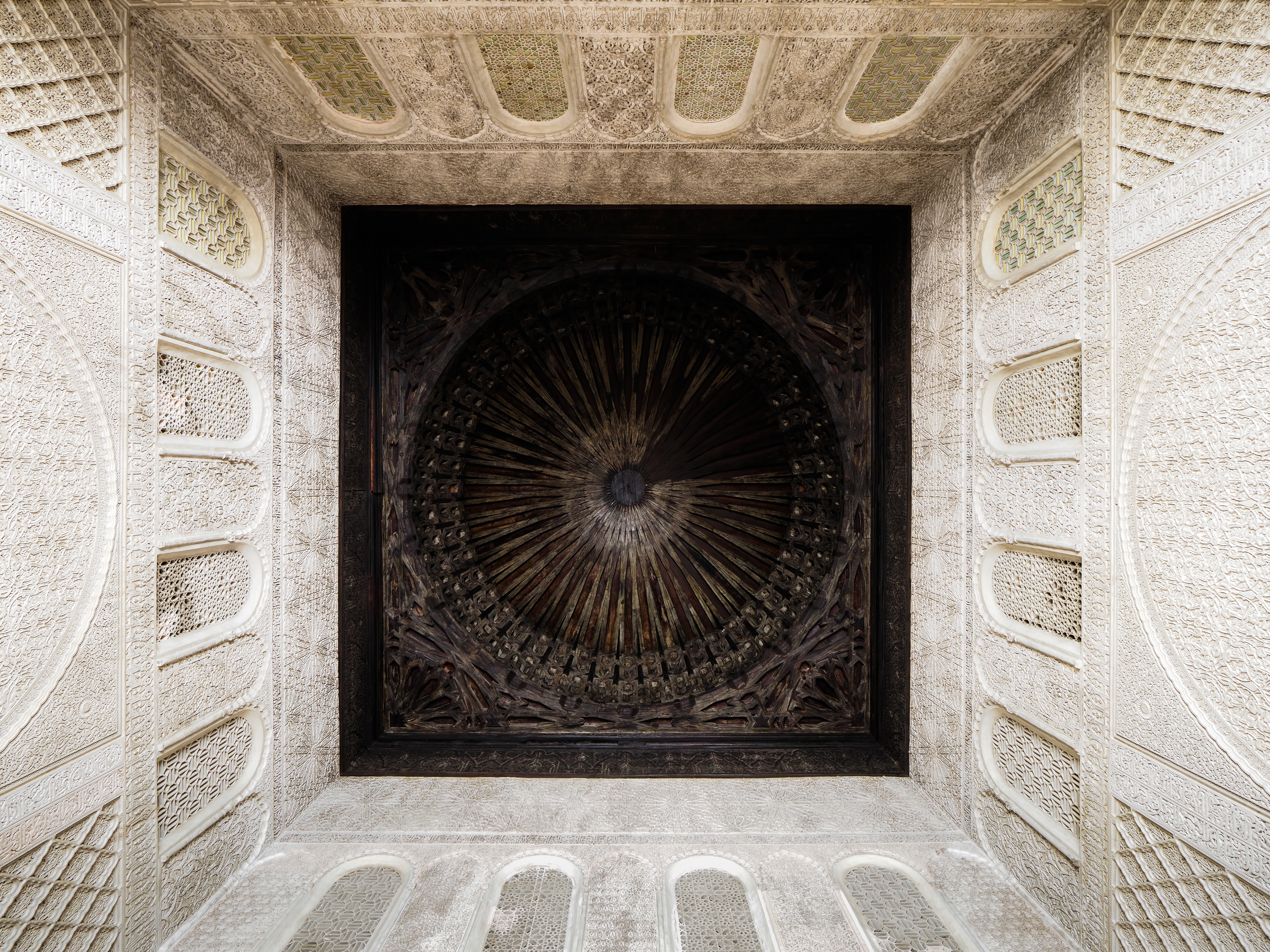
Wooden cupola ceiling over one of the lateral chambers

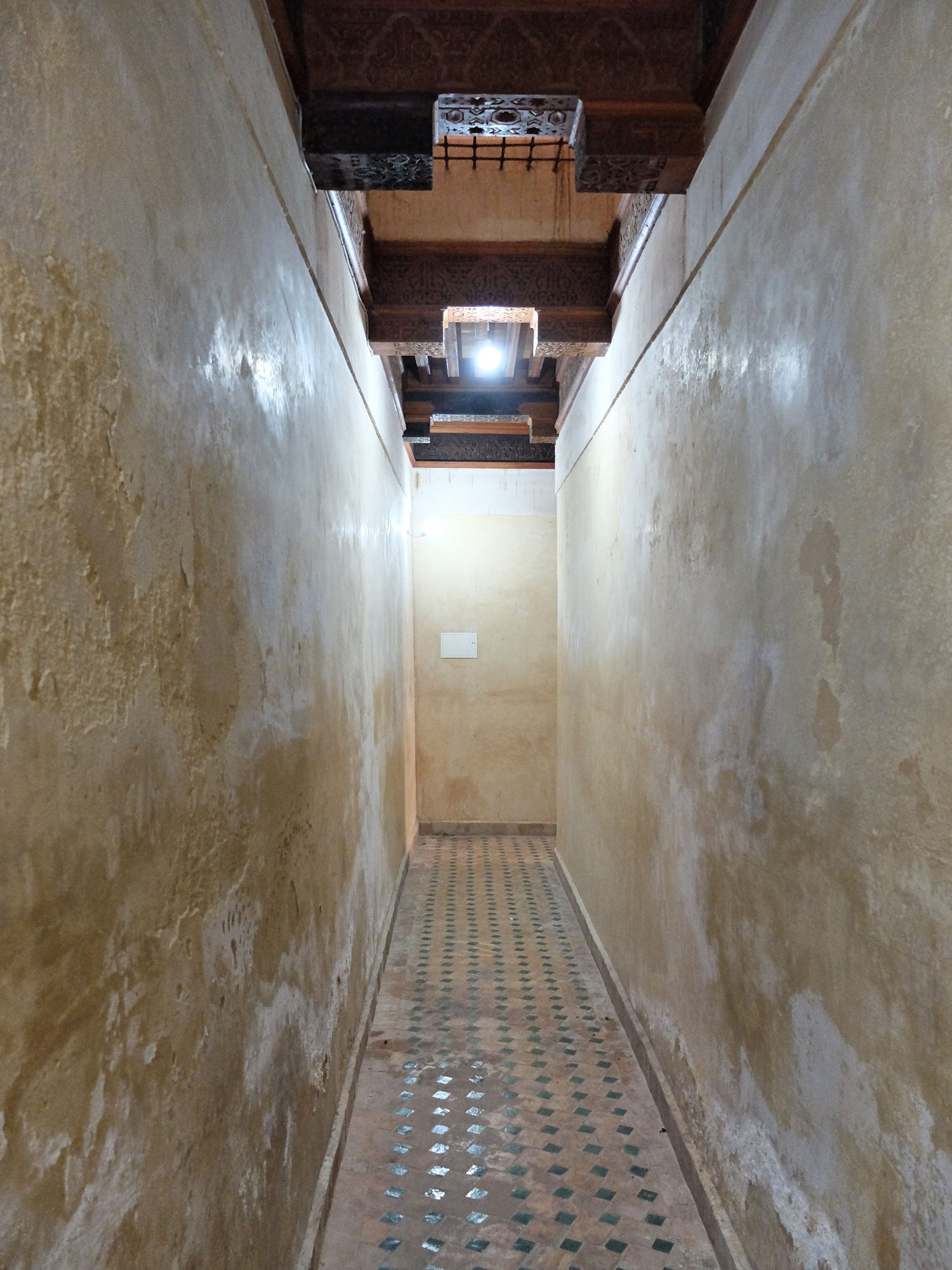
Corridors that goes around the lateral chambers, linking different parts of the ground-floor gallery

=== Prayer hall ===
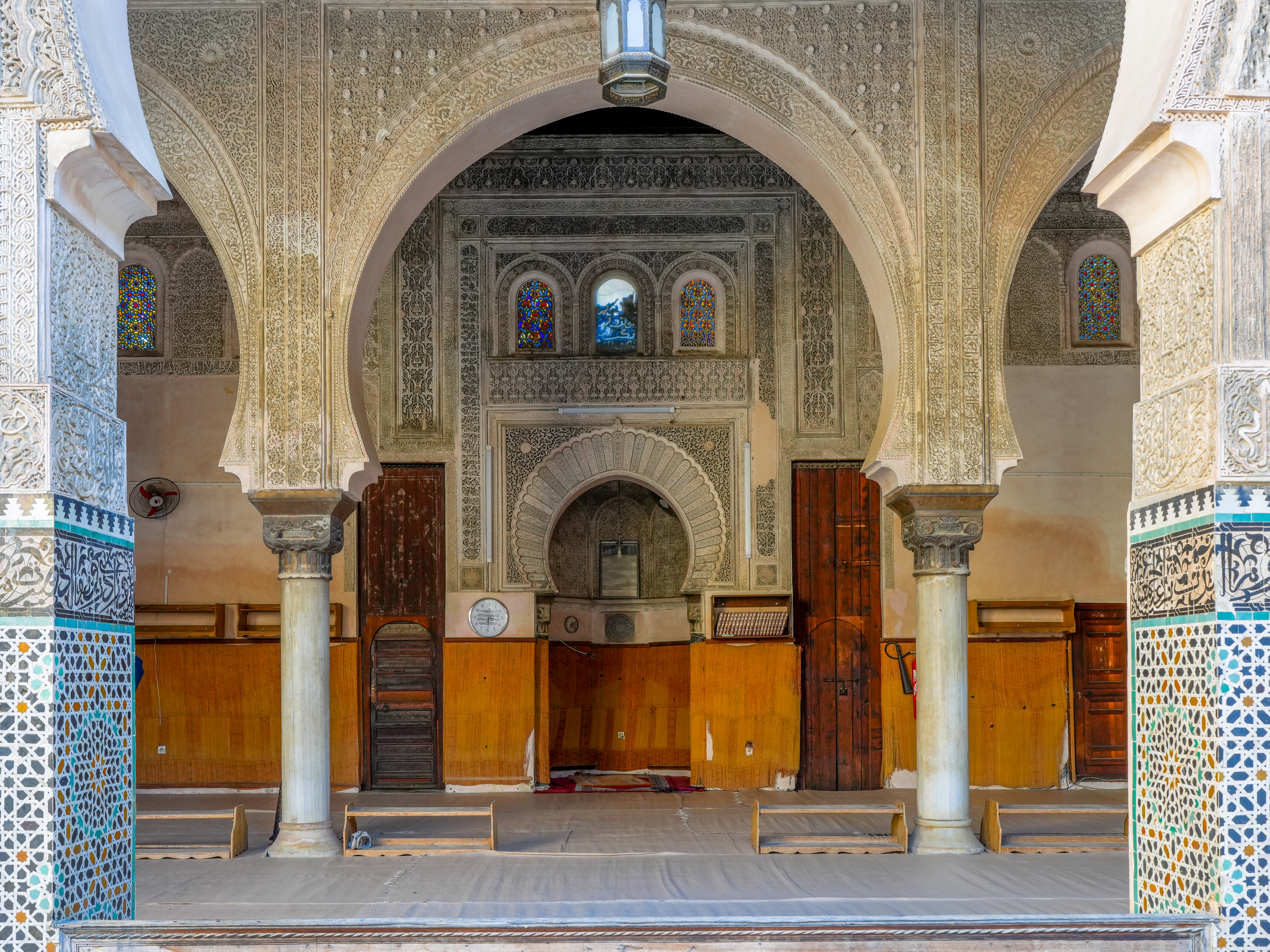
The prayer hall and mihrab

Along the south edge of the courtyard runs a small canal with water drawn from the Oued el-Lemtiyyin, one of the canals branching from the Oued Fes (Fez River) which supplies the city with water. The canal likely also served an aesthetic and possibly symbolic purpose, in addition to further assisting in ablutions. The canal is crossed by two small bridges at the corners of the courtyard which give access to a prayer hall on the other side, bordering the southern side of the courtyard.

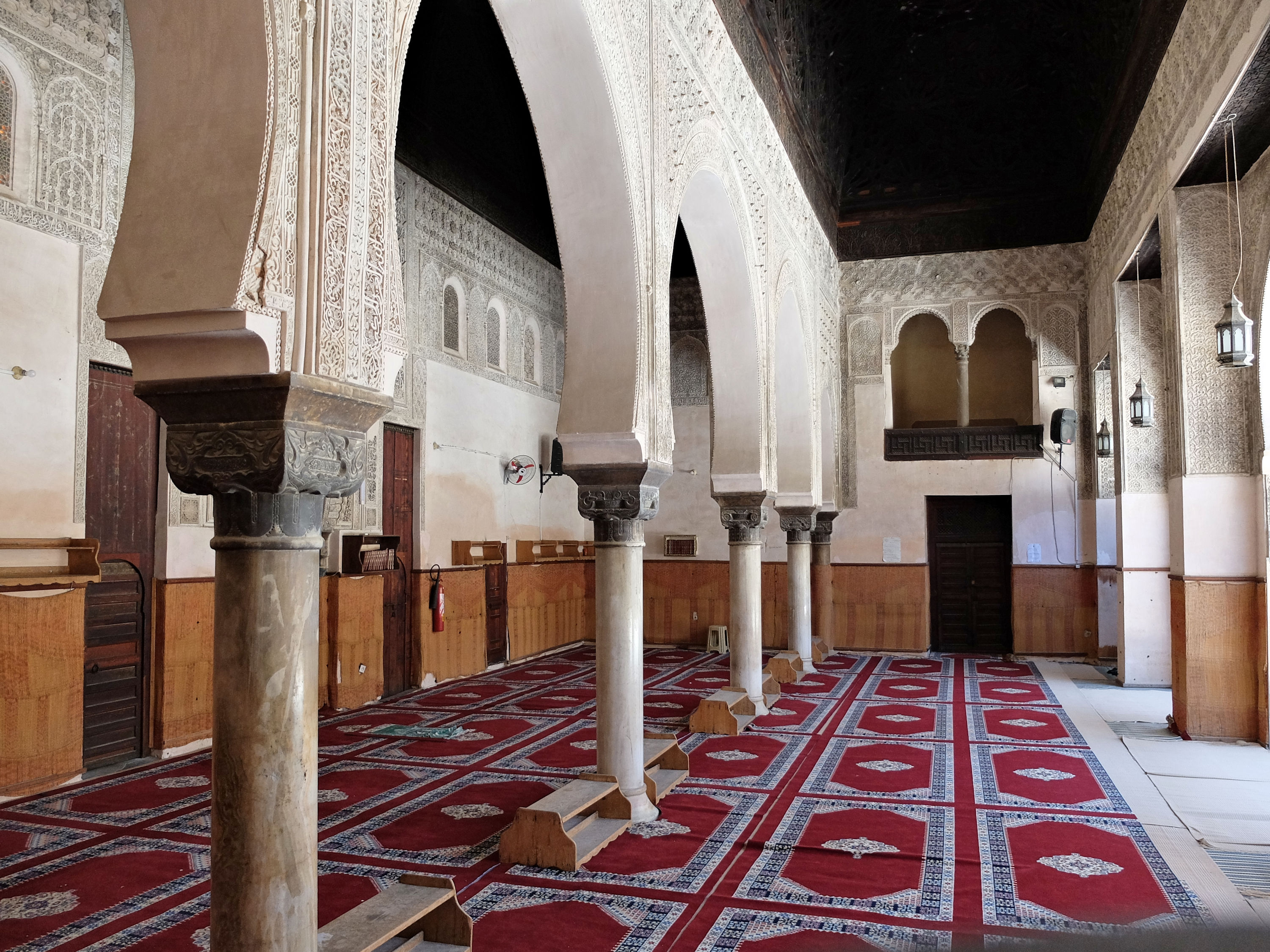
Transverse view of the prayer hall, with the window of the bayt al-i'tikaf visible on the right

This mosque area is open to the courtyard via the continuation of the gallery arches around the courtyard and its interior is thus visible from outside, although off-limits to non-Muslim visitors. The interior is divided by a transverse row of arches resting on marble and onyx columns. At the western end of the prayer hall is a bayt al-i'tikaf, a small room intended for seclusion or private prayer. The room, open to the rest of the prayer hall via a double-arched window, is elevated above the doorway that gives access to the madrasa's rear street entrance.

The far (southern) wall of the prayer hall is marked by the mosque's mihrab, a niche symbolizing the direction of prayer (qibla). The walls around the mihrab are surrounded by typical stucco-carved decoration. In the upper walls are windows with decorative stucco grilles inset with coloured glass. The two aisles of the mosque are each covered by a berchla or sloped wood-frame ceiling, as seen in many other Moroccan mosques.

=== Minaret ===
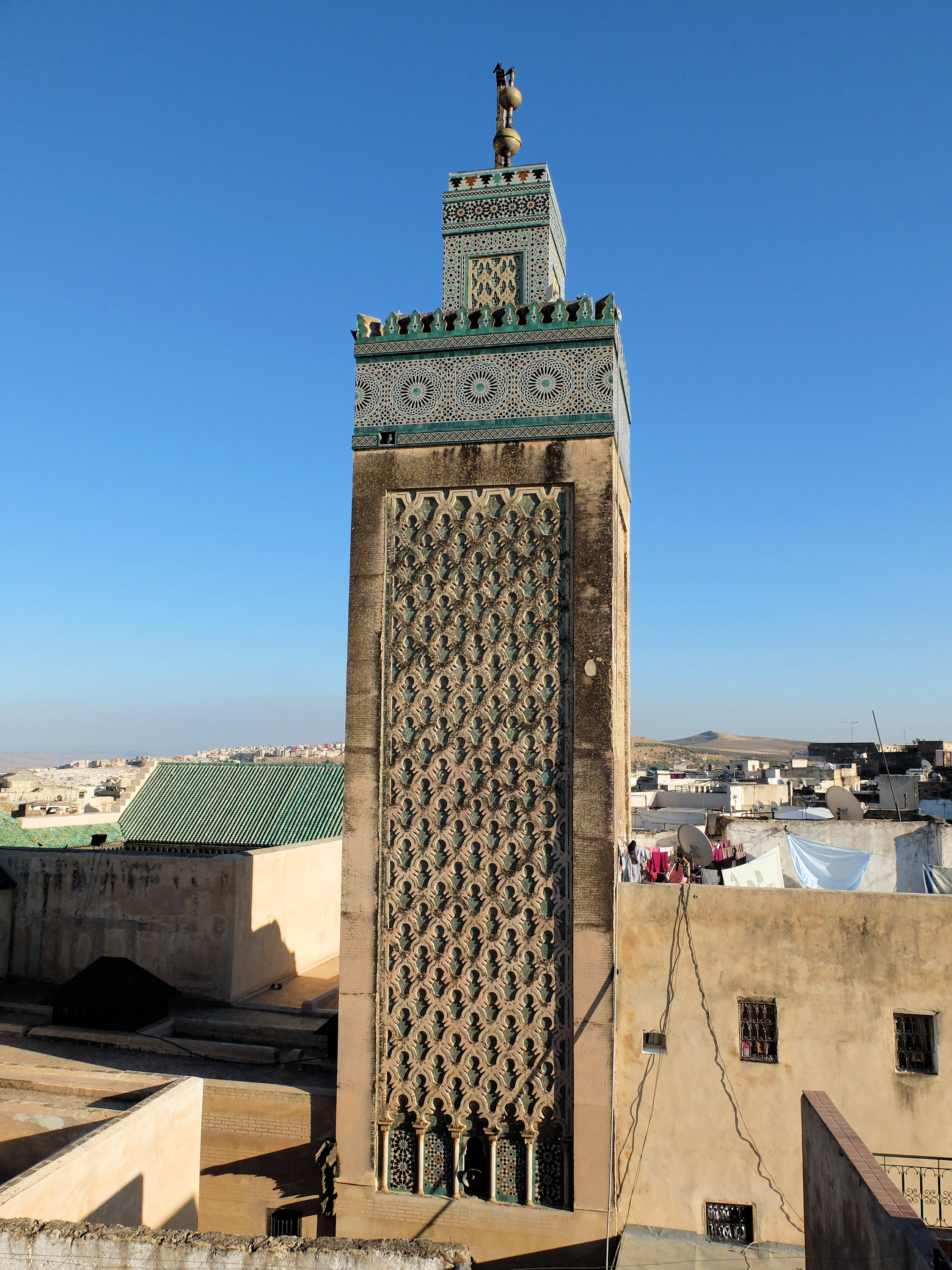
The minaret

The minaret, made of brick, rises above the northwestern corner of the madrasa. The Bou Inania is one of the only madrasas in Morocco to have a minaret, which is one of its most distinguishing features and marks its status as a Friday mosque. (Other Marinid madrasas in Morocco with minarets include the Saffarin Madrasa, the Madrasa of Fes el-Jdid, and the madrasa of Chellah, although they are less prominent and some of them were likely added after the original madrasa constructions.) Like most Moroccan minarets, it has a square shaft and is topped by a small secondary tower topped with a cupola and a metal finial with spheres. The four facades of the minaret are covered by slightly different variations of the darj wa ktaf motif (vaguely similar to a fleur-de-lys or palmette shape) common to Moroccan architecture. The empty spaces inside the motif are filled with zellij mosaic tiles. Above these motifs is a more extensive band of zellij running around the top of the minaret. The smaller secondary shaft is similarly decorated. This style of minaret is similar to other Marinid constructions of the era, such as the Chrabliyine Mosque (built further down Tala'a Kebira street) and the minaret of Chellah, both around the same period.

=== Decoration ===
The madrasa's decoration is highly refined and echoes the style that was established by the slightly earlier and smaller, but equally ornate, Madrasa al-'Attarin and Madrasa al-Sahrij. The style is most evident in the courtyard but repeated in other parts of the building. The lower walls and pillars are covered in elaborate zellij mosaic tilework forming complex geometric patterns, while a band of epigraphic or calligraphic tiles in a sgraffito-style runs above this along most of the courtyard. The middle and upper walls above this are covered in finely carved stucco with a harmonious variety of motifs including arabesques, muqarnas (especially around the windows and in the archways leading to the side chambers), Arabic calligraphic inscriptions (particularly at the middle of pillars and around the eastern and western doorways), and more geometric patterns. The spaces between the pillars of the gallery and below the windows are highlighted with carved cedar wood elements, while the walls above the stucco decoration also transition to surfaces of cedar wood carved with more arabesque motifs and Arabic inscriptions. Lastly, the top of the walls is overshadowed by a wooden canopy supported by corbels.

Both the prayer hall and the lateral study rooms off the main courtyard feature more stucco decoration along their upper walls, as well as windows with coloured glass set into stucco grilles. The mihrab of the prayer hall is itself also richly decorated with carved stucco, as is common to other Moroccan mosques. The cedar wood doors to the lateral chambers on the northeast and southwest sides of the courtyard are also finely carved, featuring bands of Arabic calligraphy and mostly covered with an interlacing geometric star pattern with arabesque fillings.

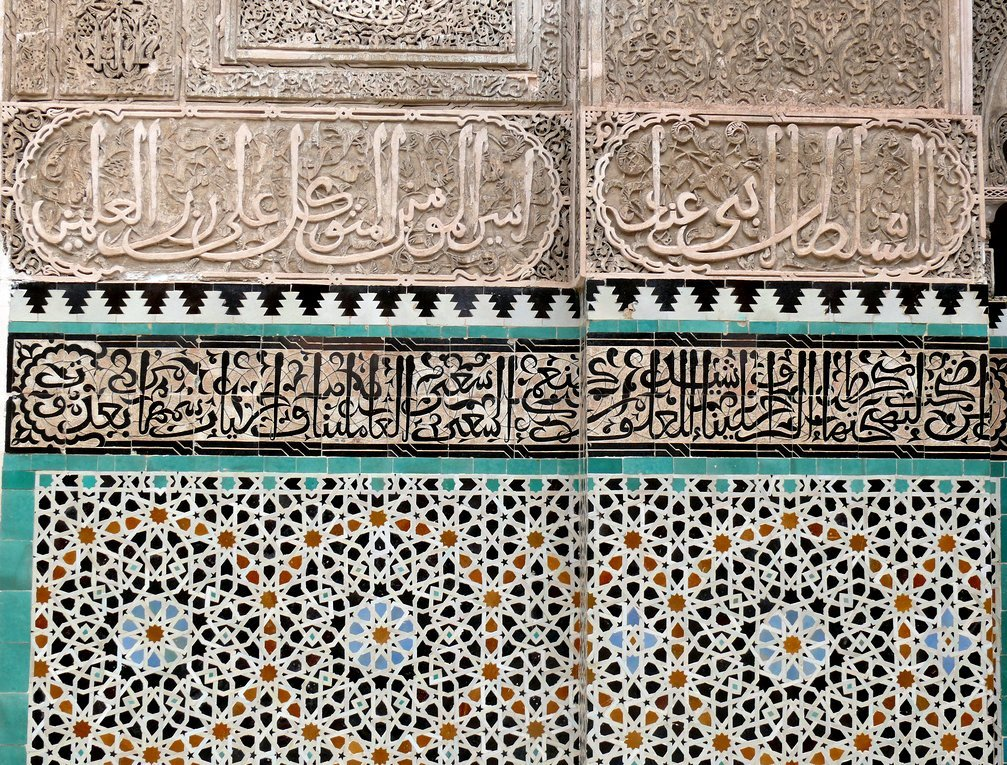
Zellij tilework featuring geometric motifs (below), with sgraffito-type tiles (middle) and stucco decoration (above) featuring Arabic calligraphy

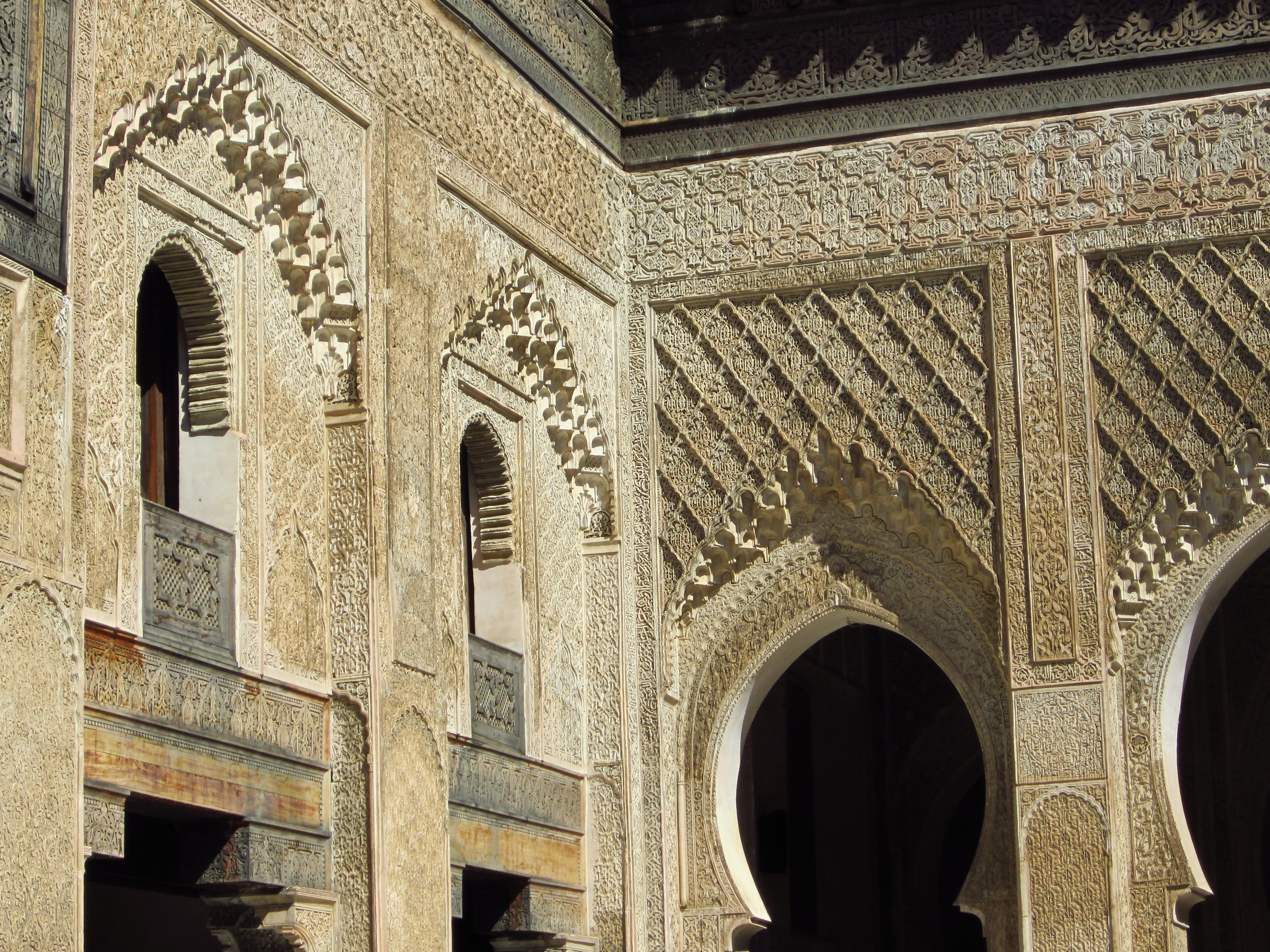
Stucco carving, including muqarnas, along the walls and arches of the courtyard

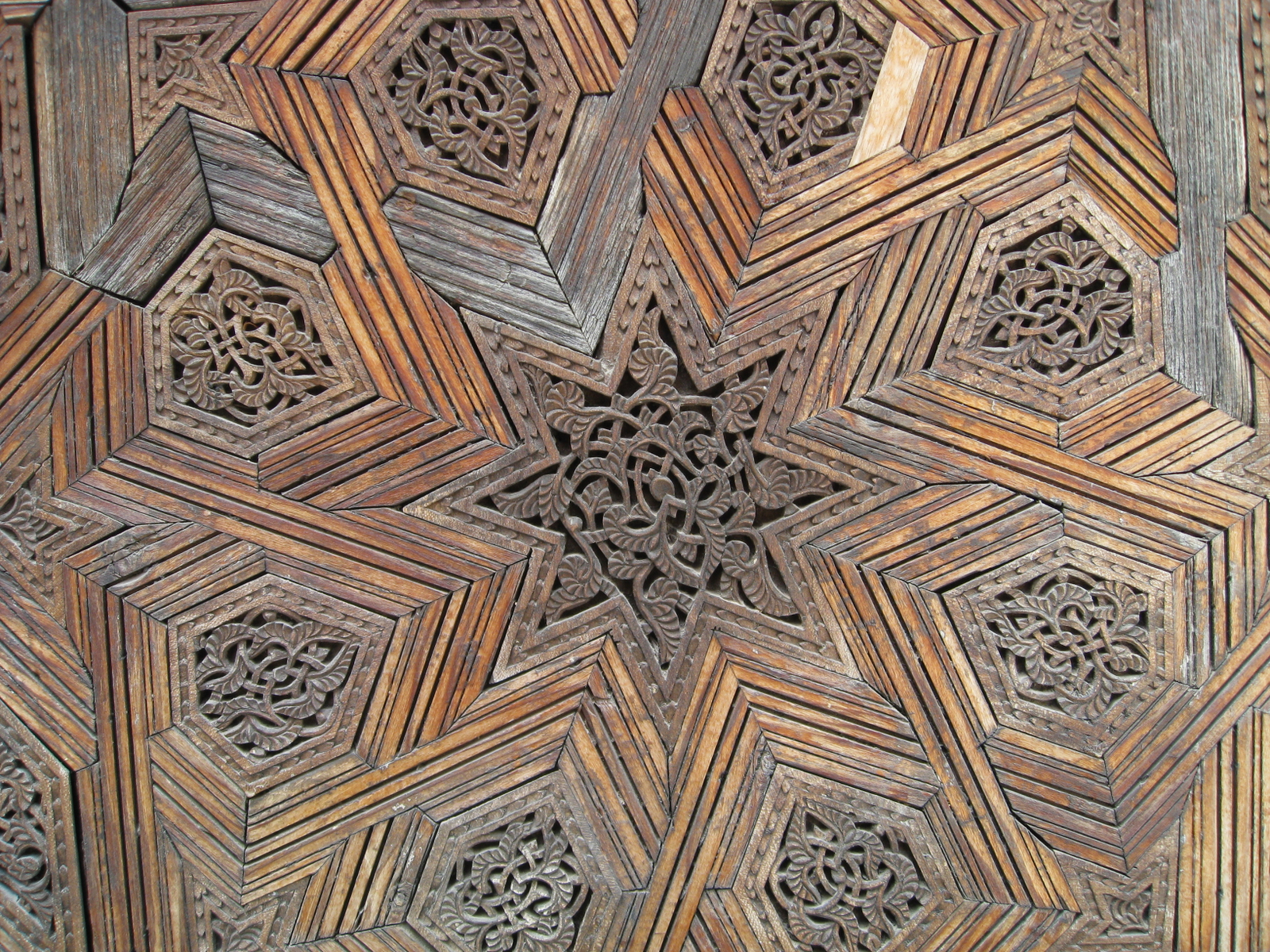
Carved geometric and arabesque details in the cedar wood doors of the lateral chambers off the courtyard

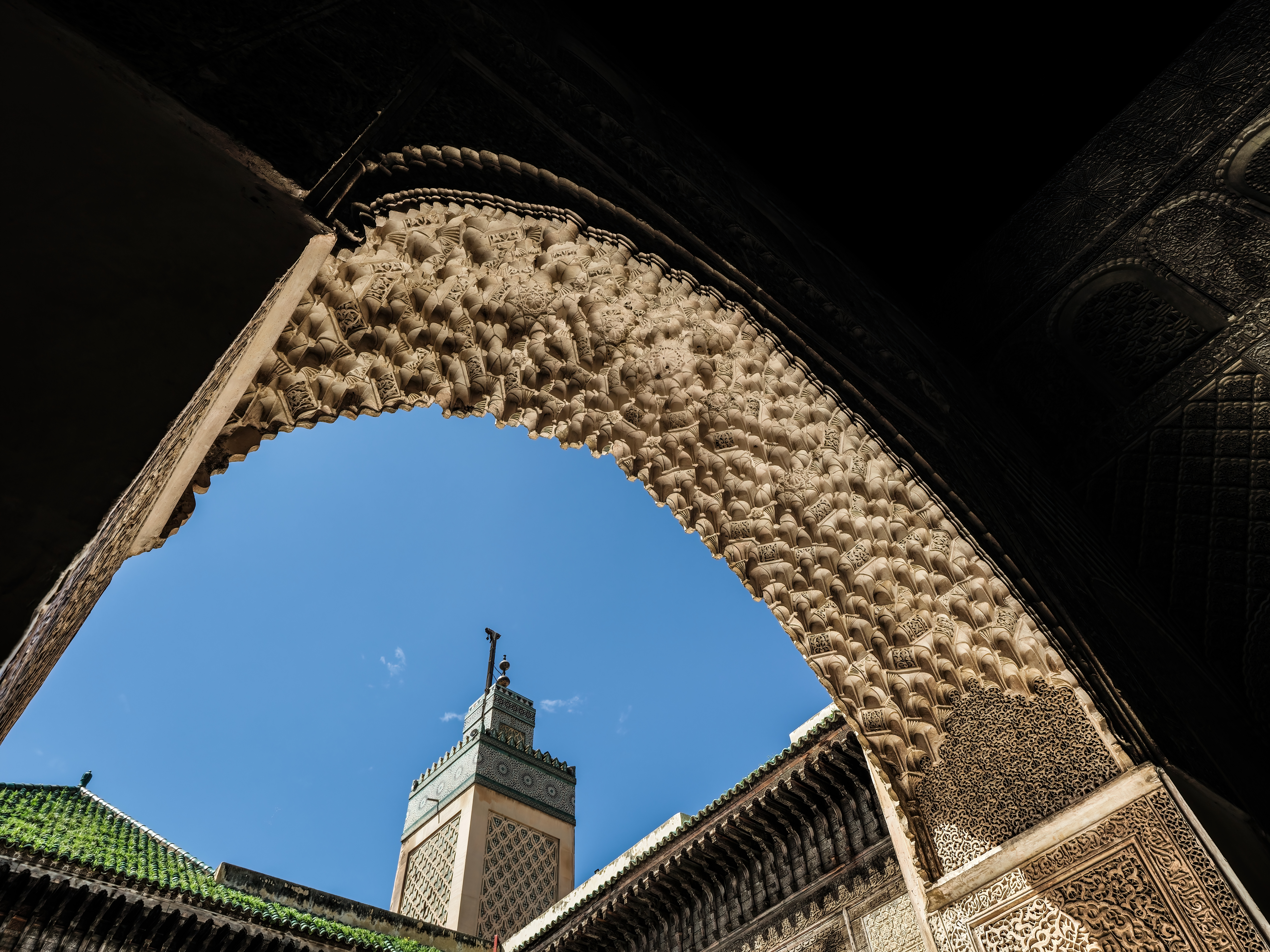
Muqarnas sculpting in the intrados of the archway at the entrance of the lateral chambers

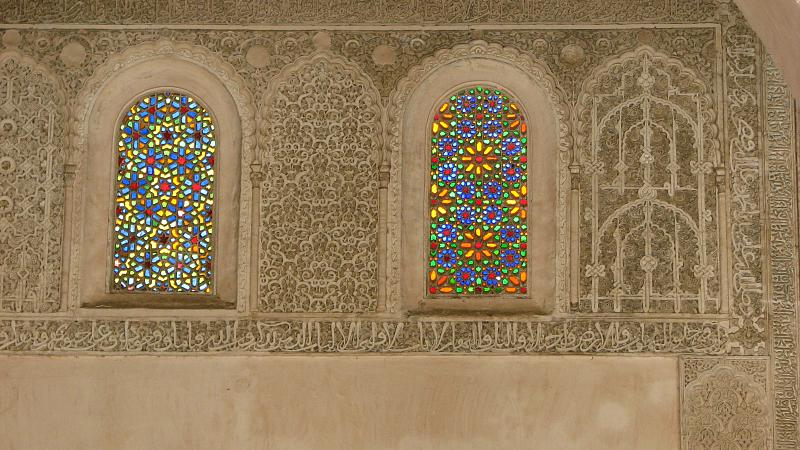
Coloured glass windows above in the prayer hall, with stucco grilles and surrounding stucco decoration

== Adjacent structures ==
=== The ablutions house (Dar al-Wudu) ===
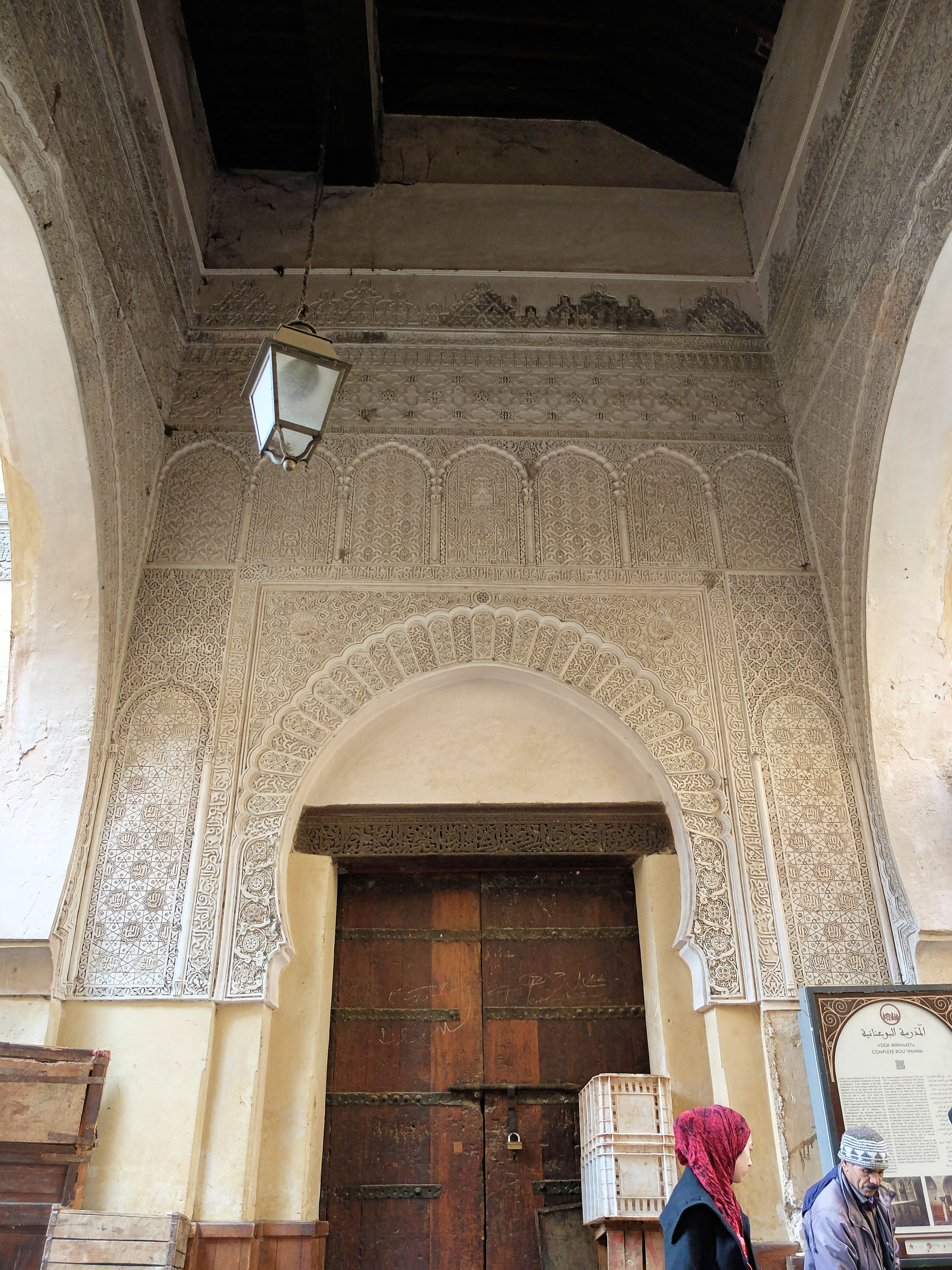
Entrance to the Dar al-Wudu (ablutions house), directly opposite the main entrance of the madrasa on Tala'a Kebira street

Opposite the main doorway of the madrasa is the entrance to the dar al-wuḍūʾ ("house of ablutions") for washing limbs and face before prayers. Like the rest of the madrasa, it was built by Sultan Abu Inan and served both the madrasa and the wider public. It is supplied with plenty of water which is used to wash away waste from the latrines included inside it. Some remnants of Marinid-era decoration in stucco and cedar wood have survived on its upper walls inside.

=== The water clock (Dar al-Magana) ===
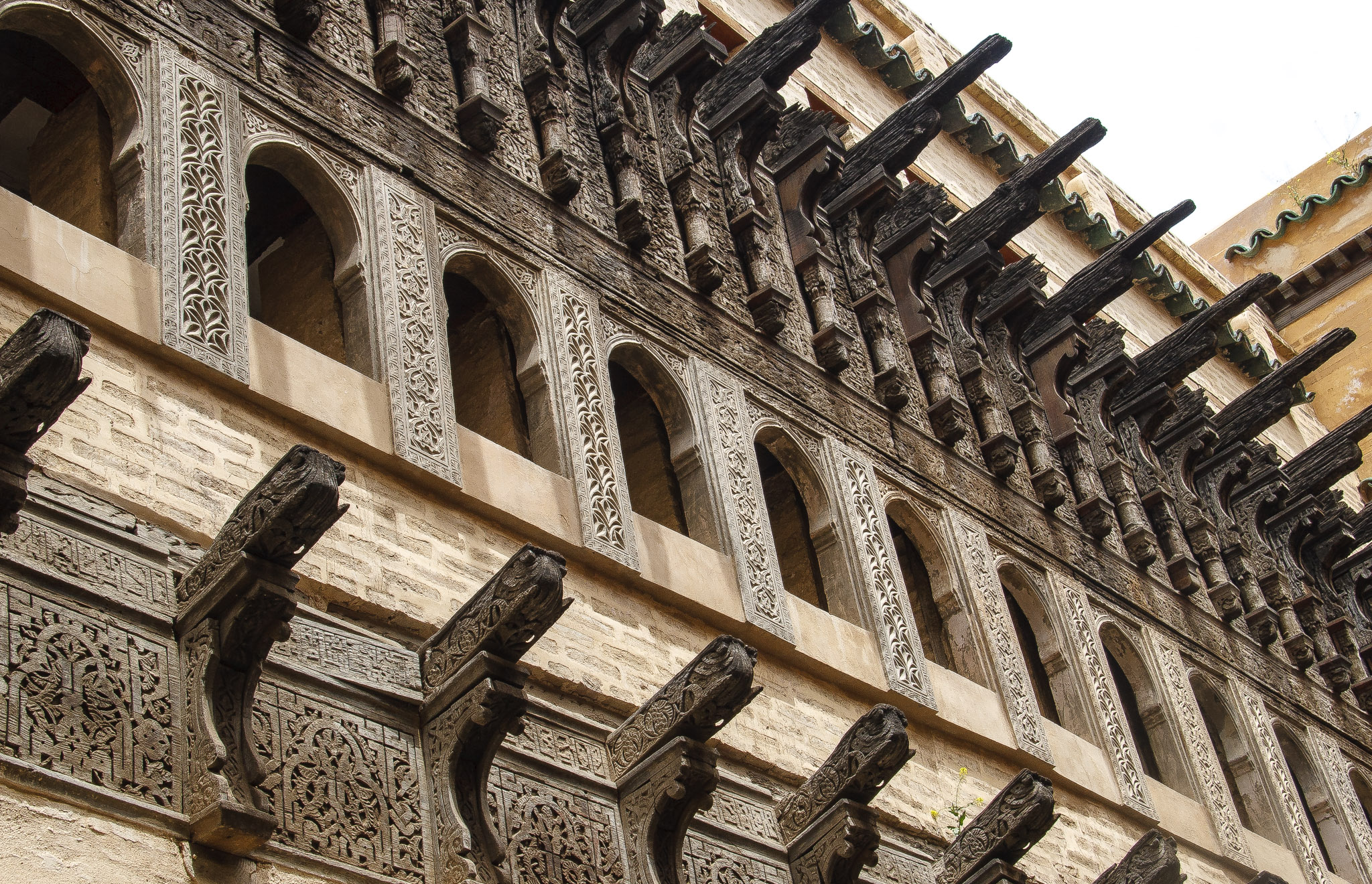
The restored facade of the Dar al-Magana today, with the remains of the hydraulic clock (except for the missing metal bowls).

Also opposite the Madrasa Bou Inania is the Dar al-Magana, a house whose street facade features a famous but not fully understood hydraulic clock. The symbolic and practical importance of a clock lay in its use for determining the correct times of prayer, and the system was overseen by the mosque's muwaqqit (timekeeper). The structure is believed to have also been built by Abu Inan alongside his madrasa complex, with one chronicler (al-Djazna'i) reporting that it was completed on May 6, 1357 (14 Djumada al-awwal, 758 AH). The facade of the building has 13 consoles (corbels) intricately carved in cedar wood, with panels of wood-carved arabesques and stylized Kufic decoration between them. Above these are twelve windows surrounded by stucco-carved decoration, above which in turn are two rows of projecting wooden corbels. The uppermost row of consoles is longer than the ones below and presumably supported a parapet or canopy that has since disappeared.

Each of the 13 consoles under the windows once supported a bronze bowl, seen in old photographs. Historical accounts describe how at every hour a lead ball or weight fell into one of the bowls to make a ringing sound, while at the same time opening the "doors" or shutters of the corresponding window. The exact mechanism that operated this system has disappeared and its workings are unknown today. It was likely powered in some way by running water, and it appears the weights or balls may have been suspended by a lead line attached to the projecting consoles above the windows. The surviving bronze bowls of the clock were removed in the later 20th century for ongoing study, though the structure itself was restored in the early 2000s.

== The minbar ==
The minbar from the Bou Inania Madrasa, on display at the Dar Batha Museum in Fez

The original minbar of the madrasa's mosque is today housed at the Dar Batha Museum (located near Bab Bou Jeloud), with a later replacement now present in the mosque itself. The minbar dates from 1350 to 1355, when the madrasa was being built, and is notable as one of the best Marinid examples of its kind. Minbars, often described or translated as a "pulpit", were mostly symbolic objects in mosques by this period; the design of the Bou Inania minbar did not allow an imam to actually climb it in practice.

The minbar's form and decoration, like most minbars of Morocco after the Almoravid period, was ultimately derived from the famous minbar of the Kutubiyya Mosque, which was commissioned in 1137 by the Almoravid ruler Ali ibn Yusuf and crafted in Cordoba, Spain (Al-Andalus). That minbar established a prestigious artistic tradition, originating from earlier Umayyad Al-Andalus, that was imitated and emulated in subsequent periods, though later minbars varied in their exact form and in the choice of the decorative methods.

Like the Kutubiyya minbar, the Bou Inania Minbar is made of wood, including ebony and other expensive woods, and is decorated with a mix of marquetry and carved pieces assembled together. The main decorative pattern along its major surfaces on either side is centered around eight-pointed stars, from which bands decorated with ivory inlay then interweave and repeat the same pattern across the rest of the surface. The spaces between these bands form other geometric shapes which are filled with wood panels of intricately carved arabesques. This motif is similar to that found on the Kutubiyya minbar and even more so to that of the slightly later Almohad minbar of the Kasbah Mosque in Marrakesh (commissioned between 1189 and 1195), which followed in the same tradition. The arch above the first step of the minbar contains an inscription, now partly disappeared, which refers to Abu Inan and his titles.

== See also ==
- Lists of mosques
- List of mosques in Africa
- List of mosques in Morocco
