= Jayrun Water Clock =

12th century water clock

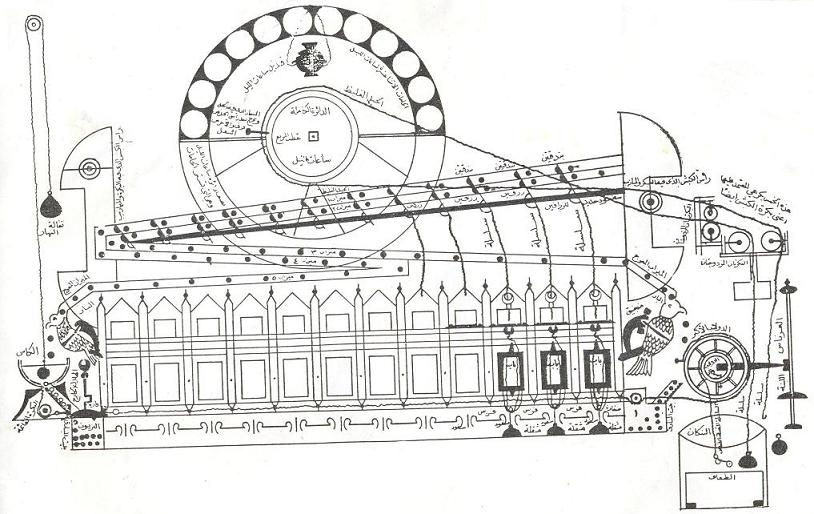
Drawing from the treatise On the Construction of Clocks and their Use (click to enlarge)

The Jayrun Water Clock, a water clock built by the Muslim engineer Muhammad al-Sa'ati, was positioned at the gate of Damascus, Syria, at the exit of the Umayyad Mosque in the 12th century during the reign of Nur ad-Din Zangi.

There is a full description of the clock in the treatise Ktab 'Amal al-sa'at wa-l-amal biha (On the Construction of Clocks and their Use) written by Ridwan b. al Saati in 1203. This treatise describes the reconstruction by Ridwan of the water clock which was built by his father, Muhammad al-Saati, in the reign of Nur al-Din Mahmud b. Zanki in Damascus (reigned 1154–74). "The clock-face consisted of wall of timber about 4.23 metres wide and 2.78 metres high. In this screen was a row of doors, at either end of which was the figure of a falcon. During the day a small crescent moved at constant speed in front of the doors and at every hour a door rotated to reveal a different colour, the falcons leant forward, discharged pellets on to cymbals and resumed their upright positions. Above the doors a zodiac circle rotated at constant speed. Above this was a semicircle of twelve circular holes. During the night one of these holes became fully illuminated every hour. The clock was operated by the "Archimedes" water machinery and the motion transmitted to the activating mechanisms by pulley and rope systems."

A full-size reconstruction of the clock can be seen in the Nationaal Beiaard- en Natuurmuseum Asten in the Netherlands.

== See also ==
- Dar al-Magana
