= Dar al-Magana =

Building in Fes, Morocco

Coordinates: 34.0622°N 4.9824°W

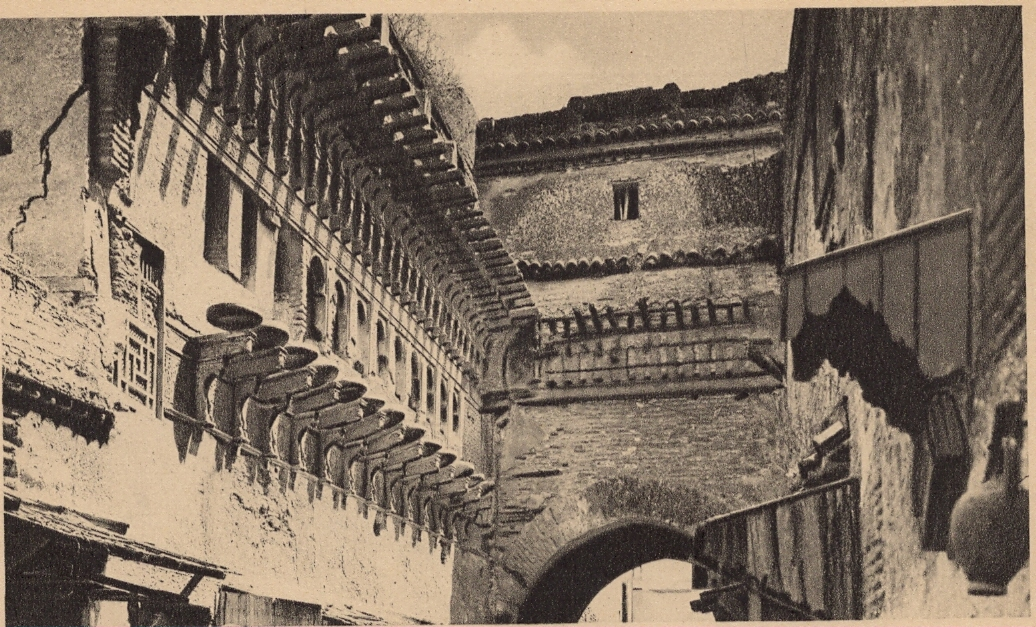
Dar al-Magana in the beginning of the last century. Metal balls were released from twelve little doors into brass bowls on the lower beams to signal the hours. The rafters on the top level originally supported a small roof, now gone.

Dar al-Magana (Arabic: دار المكانة, lit. 'House of the Clock') is a 14th-century building in Fes, Morocco, built by the Marinid Sultan Abu Inan Faris which houses a weight-powered water clock. It is located opposite the Bou Inania Madrasa on Tala'a Kebira street and was created to serve that madrasa and its mosque, which was also built by Abu Inan around the same time.

The building is also sometimes referred to as the "House of Maimonides" due to a popular legend which claims that the house was once the residence of the famous Jewish philosopher Maimonides.

== History ==
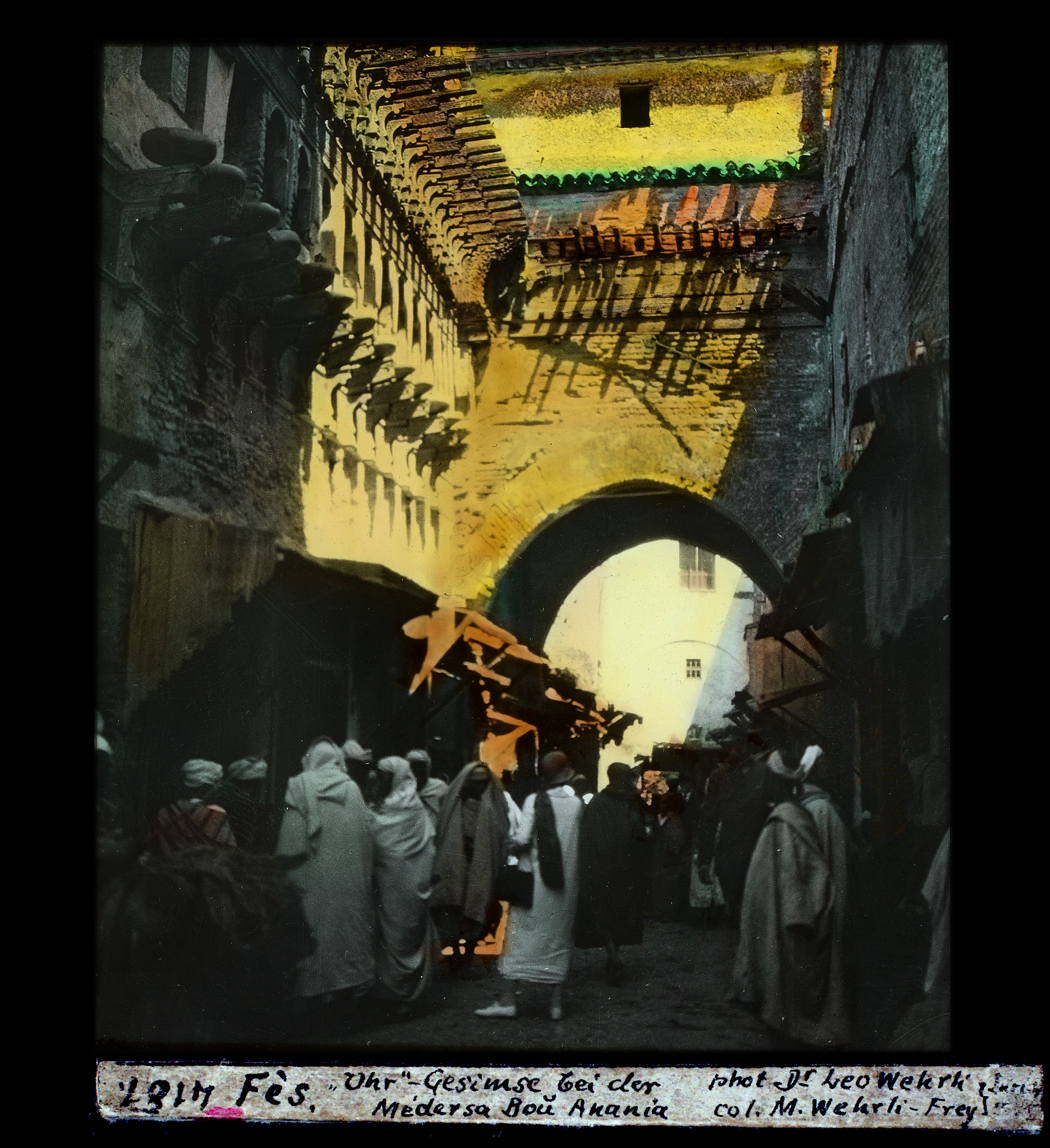
The bowls of Dar al-Magana over the Tala'a Kebira in 1925.

The clock was part of the large charitable complex centered around the Bou Inania Madrasa built by the Marinid sultan Abu Inan. According to its foundation inscription, construction on the madrasa itself started on December 28, 1350 CE (28 Ramadan 751 AH) and finished in 1355 (756 AH). According to the historical chronicler al-Jazna'i, the water clock was completed on 6 May 1357 (14 Djumada al-awwal, 758 AH). The designer of the clock was a muwaqqit named Abu al-Hassan ibn Ali Ahmed el-Tlemsani. The clock may have followed similar principles as that of an earlier water clock built for the Dar al-Muwaqqit of the Qarawiyyin Mosque by Sultan Abu Said in 1317.

== Description ==
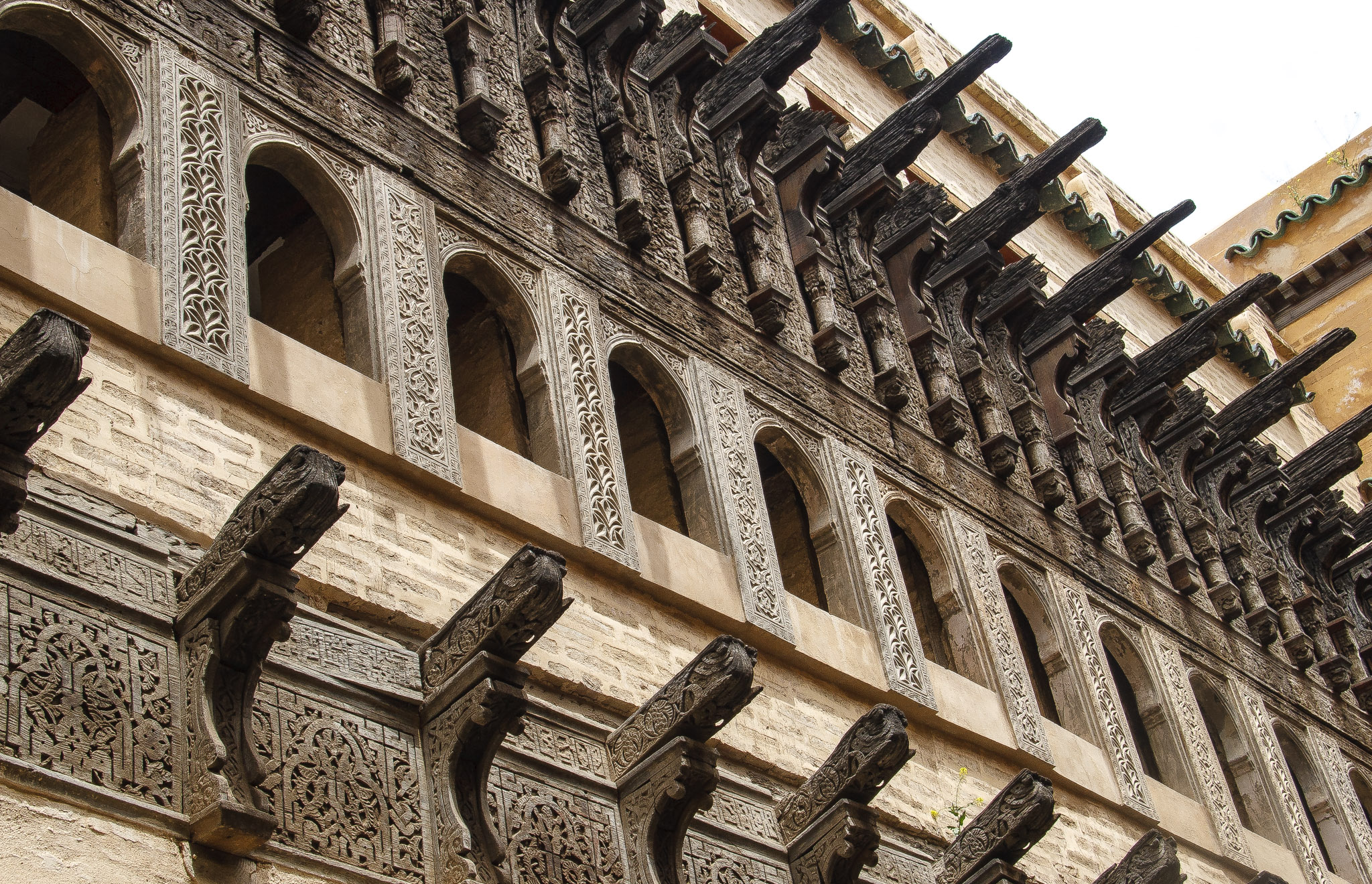
The restored facade of the Dar al-Magana today (with the bowls missing)

The clock consists of 12 windows and platforms carrying brass bowls. The motion of the clock was presumably maintained by a kind of small cart which ran from left to right behind the twelve doors. At one end, the cart was attached to a rope with a hanging weight; at the other end to a rope with a weight that floated on the surface of a water reservoir that was drained at a regular pace. Each hour one of the doors opened; at the same time a metal ball was dropped into one of the twelve brass bowls. (Note: Its mechanism can be compared to that of the Clock of Ridwan al-Saati of the Umayyad Mosque in Damascus, the Andalusian water clocks (a.o. in Toledo, described by Ibn Khalaf al-Muradi, reconstructed by the Museo Nacional de la Ciencia y la Tecnologia in Madrid in 1995) and the water clock described by Al-Jazari which was reconstructed by the London Science Museum in 1976 and still on display at the Nationaal Beiaard en Natuurmuseum in Asten, Netherlands (see under Beiaardcollectie, Astronomische kunstuurwerken). Archived 2009-01-04 at the Wayback Machine) The rafters sticking out of the building above the doors (similar to the rafters of the Bou Inania Madrasa) supported a small roof to shield the doors and bowls. The facade of the building is decorated with carved stucco around the windows and by sculpted arabesque and epigraphic motifs on the wooden rafters and corbels.

== State of preservation ==
The clock has been defunct for generations and a lack of documentation and collective memory about its exact functioning has impeded efforts to repair it. The bowls have been removed since 2004 with the aim of repairing or reconstructing its mechanism, though the project, managed by ADER-Fes (a foundation for the restoration of monuments in Fes), has been unsuccessful in this regard so far. The structure and facade of the house itself was also restored in the early 2000s.

== See also ==
- Clock of Ridwan al-Saati
- Elephant clock of al-Jazari
- Dar al-Muwaqqit
