= Rizwan Ahmed =

Rizwan Ahmed may refer to:

- Riz Ahmed (born 1982), a British actor and rapper
- Rizwan Ahmed (civil servant), a senior Pakistani government official
- Rizwan Ahmed (cricketer) (born 1978), a Pakistani cricketer who played for the national team and Hyderabad
- Rizwan Ahmed (Lahore cricketer) (born 1976), a Pakistani cricketer who played for Lahore
