= Redouane =

Redouane is an Arabic masculine given name, the Francized spelling of Ridwan. Notable people with the name include:

- Hajry Redouane (born 1964), retired Moroccan footballer who played as an attacking midfielder, and a manager
- Redouane Akniouene (born 1982), Algerian footballer
- Redouane Barkaoui (born 1979), Moroccan footballer
- Redouane Bouchtouk (born 1976), Moroccan boxer
- Wassila Redouane Saïd-Guerni (born 1980), Algerian foil fencer

== See also ==
- Ridvan
- Radhouane
