= Garden of Ridván =

Garden of Ridván (lit. garden of paradise) may refer to:

- Garden of Ridván, Baghdad
- Garden of Ridván, Akka

== See also ==
- Ridvan, a Turkish given name
