= Radwan (name) =

Radwan or Redwan or Ridwan (in Arabic رضوان) is a given name and a surname. Notable people with the name include:

== Patronym ==
- Ridwan dynasty
- Abu Nu'aym Ridwan, minister and military commander in the Emirate of Granada
- Ali ibn Ridwan Al-Misri (c. 988 - c. 1061), Arab of Egyptian origin who was a physician, astrologer and astronomer
- Fakhr al-Mulk Ridwan (c. 1077 – 1113), Seljuk emir of Aleppo from 1095 until his death

== Given name ==
=== Radwan ===
- Radwan (bishop of Poznań) (died 1172), bishop of Poznań probably in the years 1164 to 1172
- Radwan Al Azhar (born 1979), Syrian footballer
- Radwan al-Habib (born 1962), Syrian politician and government minister
- Radwan Al Hilu (1909–1975), Palestinian Arab politician
- Radwan Kalaji (born 1992), Syrian footballer
- Radwan Karout (born 1950), Syrian wrestler and Olympian
- Radwan Ghazi Moumneh, Canadian recording engineer, producer and musician
- Radwan Al-Sheikh Hassan, Syrian footballer

=== Redwan ===
- Redwan Ahmed, Bangladeshi politician and minister
- Redwan Bourlès (born 2003), French footballer
- Redwan Hussein Rameto (born 1971), Ethiopian politician and diplomat
- Redwan Al-Mousa, Saudi Arabian footballer
- Redwan Rony or Redoan Rony, Bangladeshi filmmaker
- Redwan El-Zaouiki (born 1953), Syrian judoka
- Rédoine Faïd (born 1972), French gangster of Algerian descent

=== Ridwan ===
- Fakhr al-Din ibn al-Sa'ati, known as Ridwan, 13th-century Syrian clockmaker, writer, and government official
- Ridwan Pasha (died 1585), 16th-century Ottoman statesman
- Ridwan Awaludin (born 1992), Indonesian footballer
- Ridwan Kamil (born 1971), Indonesian architect and politician
- Ridwan Kodiat (born 1951), Indonesian body builder
- Ridwan Laher Nytagodien, South African university professor in political science, an independent political consultant
- Ridwan Suwidi (1936–2022), Indonesian politician
- Ridwan Tawainella (born 1995), Indonesian footballer

=== Rizvan ===
- Rizvan, Turkish equivalent of the name

== Middle name ==
- Abass Ridwan Duada, Ghanaian politician and member of Parliament
- Mohammad Ridwan Hafiedz or Ridho (born 1973), Indonesian guitarist, backing vocalist and songwriter

== Surname ==
=== Radwan ===
- Adam Radwan (born 1997), English rugby union player
- Alexander Radwan (born 1964), German politician
- Ashruf Radwan (born 1961), better known as Andy Blade, singer and guitarist of early first-wave 1976 UK punk rock band Eater
- Edmund P. Radwan (1911–1959), American politician
- Hisham Radwan (born 1955), Egyptian volleyball player
- Lutfi Radwan (born 1962), ex-drummer with 1976 UK punk rock band Eater (band)
- Mahmoud Radwan (born 1989), Egyptian handball player
- Mohamed Radwan (born 1958), Egyptian football manager
- Najim al-Radwan (1972–2018), Saudi Arabian weightlifter
- Noha Radwan, Egyptian-born American literary scholar
- Sam Radwan, partner and co-founder of ENHANCE International LLC, a management consultancy
- Samir Radwan, Egyptian politician
- Shady Radwan (born 2001), Egyptian footballer
- Stanley Radwan (1908–1998), American strongman and professional wrestler
- Tadeusz Radwan (1945–2003), Polish luger
- Yasser Radwan (born 1972), Egyptian footballer

=== Ridwan ===
- Fitra Ridwan (born 1994), Indonesian professional footballer
- Hendra Ridwan (born 1985), Indonesian footballer
- Kenny Ridwan (born 1999), American actor
- Muhammad Ridwan (born 1980), Indonesian footballer
- Muhamad Ridwan (footballer, born June 2000), Indonesian professional footballer

=== See also ===
- Ridwan (name)
