= Radvaň =

Radvaň may refer to:

- Radvaň, Banská Bystrica
- Radvaň nad Dunajom, Nitra Region
- Radvaň nad Laborcom, Prešov Region
- Čiližská Radvaň, Trnava Region

== See also ==
- Radwan (disambiguation)
