= Fakhr al-Din ibn al-Sa'ati =

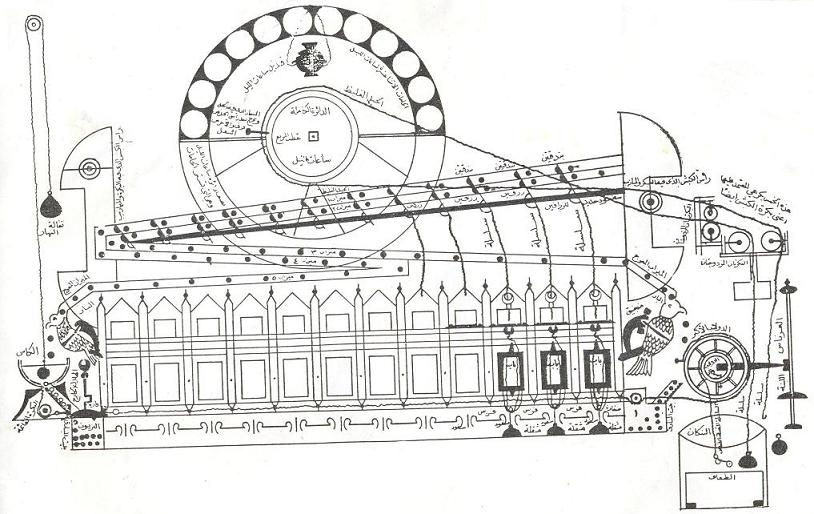
Drawing of his father's clock by Riḍwān ibn al-Sāʿātī

Fakhr al-Dīn Riḍwān ibn Muḥammad ibn ʿAlī ibn Rustam al-Khurāsānī al-Sāʿātī (died c. 1230), called Ibn al-Sāʿātī (son of the clockmaker), was a Syrian Muslim physician, government official and writer.

Riḍwān's father, Muḥammad, was a native of Khorasan who moved to Damascus, where Riḍwān was born. Riḍwān's brother, Bahāʿ al-Dīn ibn al-Sāʿātī, became a famous poet.

Muḥammad was a muwaqqit trained in clockmaking and astronomy who was commissioned by the Emir Nūr al-Dīn (1156–1174) to construct the water clock at the Jayrūn Gate by the entrance of the Umayyad Mosque in Damascus. Riḍwān also learned clockmaking and wrote a book in Arabic on his father's clock and the repairs and improvements he made to them, Risāla fī ʿamal al-sāʿāt wā-ʾstiʿmālihā. This work he finished in 1203, after his father's death. Although overlong and redundant, it provides details of manufacture not typically found in such treatises. It also provides evidence for the exchange of horological ideas between the Hellenistic world and Sasanian Iran. It has been abridged and translated into German.

Called Ibn al-Sāʿātī on account of his father, Riḍwān studied medicine, literature, logic and philosophy on top of clockmaking. He wrote commentaries on the Canon of Medicine and the Book of Colic of Ibn Sīnā. He became a practising physician, and served as the vizier of al-Malik al-Fāʾiz, son of the Sultan al-ʿĀdil I, and afterwards of his brother, al-Malik al-Muʿaẓẓam, emir of Damascus (1218–1227), whom he also served as a physician. According to Yāqūt al-Rūmī, Ibn al-Sāʿātī loved music and poetry. He could play the lute and he collected works of Arabic poetry into a book, the Kitāb al-Muhtārāt. He died at Damascus around 1230. Yāqūt, however, places his death in 1221.

== Bibliography ==
- Basuguy, B. (2019). "Medical Developments During the Reign of Salah al-Dîn al-Ayyûbî and the Famous Physicians of the Period" (PDF). Journal of Research on History of Medicine. 8 (1): 3–18.
- Hill, D. R. (1981). Arabic Water-clocks. University of Aleppo, Institute for the History of Arabic Science.
- Hill, D. R. (1991). "Arabic Mechanical Engineering: Survey of the Historical Sources". Arabic Sciences and Philosophy. 1 (2): 167–186. doi:10.1017/S0957423900001478. S2CID 145180608.
- Joosse, N. Peter (2019). "Ibn al-Sāʿātī, Fakhr al-Dīn". In Fleet, Kate; Krämer, Gudrun; Matringe, Denis; Nawas, John; Rowson, Everett (eds.). Encyclopaedia of Islam (3rd ed.). Brill Online. ISSN 1873-9830.
- Suter, H. & Vernet, J. (1971). "Ibn al-Sāʿātī". In Lewis, B.; Ménage, V. L.; Pellat, Ch. & Schacht, J. (eds.). The Encyclopaedia of Islam, Second Edition. Volume III: H–Iram. Leiden: E. J. Brill. p. 921. OCLC 495469525.
- Wiedemann, E.; Hauser, F. (1915). "Uber die Uhren im Bereich der islamischen Kultur". Nova Acta Academiae Naturae Curiosorum. 100: 176–267.
