= Muhammad Rizwan =

Muhammad Rizwan or Mohammad Rizwan may refer to:

- Mohammad Rizwan, (born 1992) Pakistani international cricketer
- Mohammad Rizwan (politician), (born 1953) Indian politician
- Muhammad Rizwan Sr., (born 1989) Pakistani field hockey player
- Muhammad Rizwan Jr., (born 1994) Pakistani field hockey player
- Muhammad Rizwan (kabaddi), Pakistani kabaddi player
- Muhammad Rizwan (officer), Pakistani civil servant
- Bao Muhammad Rizwan, Pakistani politician
