= Rizwan Mosque =

Ahmadi Muslim mosque in Portland, in the US state of Oregon

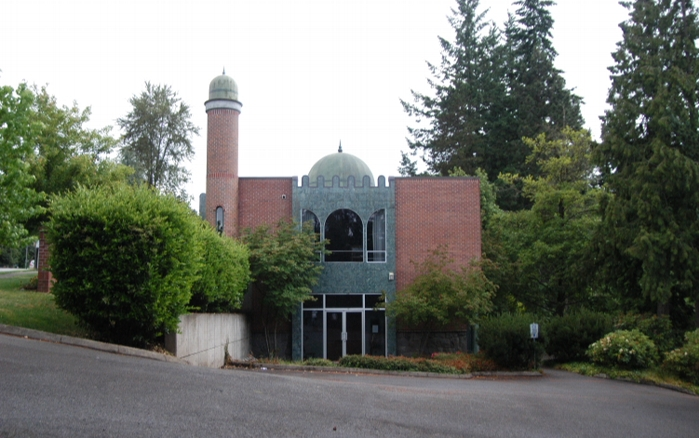

Religion
- Affiliation: Islam
- Branch/tradition: Ahmadiyya

Location
- Location: Portland, United States
- Interactive map of Rizwan Mosque
- Coordinates: 45.453318°N 122.713107°W

Architecture
- Type: mosque
- Completed: 1987

Specifications
- Capacity: 500
- Dome: 1
- Minaret: 1

Rizwan Mosque is an Ahmadi Muslim mosque in Portland, in the US state of Oregon. It was opened in 1987, making it the first and oldest mosque built in Portland. It is operated by the Portland chapter.

== See also ==
- Culture of Portland, Oregon
- Religion in Portland, Oregon
