= Răzvan =

Romanian-language male given name

- Gender: masculine
- Language: Romanian

Răzvan is a Romanian-language male given name. It may refer to:

== People ==
=== Sports ===
==== Association football ====
- Răzvan Andronic — (2000-) midfielder
- Răzvan Avram — (1986-) footballer
- Răzvan Burleanu — (1984-) president of the Romanian Football Federation
- Răzvan Cociș — (1983-) former footballer
- Răzvan Dâlbea — (1981-) former footballer
- Răzvan Damian — (1983-) defender
- Răzvan Ştefănel Farmache — (1978-) footballer
- Răzvan Oaidă — (1998-) midfielder

==== Motor racing ====
- Răzvan Petru Umbrărescu — (1993-) racing driver

==== Rugby union ====
- Răzvan Ailenei — (1992-) footballer

==== Swimming ====
- Răzvan Florea — (1980-) backstroke swimmer

== Fictional characters ==
=== Films ===
- King Răzvan, the villain of Dragonheart: Vengeance

== See also ==
- Ștefan Răzvan
