= Rizvan =

Rizvan or Rızvan is a Turkish masculine given name. Notable people with the name include:

== Rizvan ==
- Rizvan Ablitarov (born 1989), Ukrainian footballer
- Rizvan Chitigov (1964–2005), Chechen rebel field commander
- Rizvan Farzaliyev (born 1979), Azerbaijani futsal player
- Rizvan Gadzhiev (born 1987), Dagestan ASSR born Belarus freestyle wrestler
- Rizvan Geliskhanov (born 1963), Soviet weightlifter of Chechen origin
- Rizvan Pashayev (1949–2007), Azerbaijani mathematician
- Rizvan Rahman (born 1970), Pakistan-born British painter
- Rizvan Sadayev (born 1979), Russian footballer
- Rızvan Şahin (born 1989), Turkish footballer
- Rizvan Umarov (born 1993), Russia-born Azeri footballer
- Rizvan Utsiyev (born 1988), Russian footballer
- Rizvan Ay (born 1989), German Full-Stack-Developer

== Rızvan ==
- Rızvan Özbey (born 1948), Turkish cross-country skier

== See also ==
- Ridvan
