= Rizwan Ahmed (Lahore cricketer) =

Pakistani cricketer (born 1976)

Personal information
- Born: 8 November 1976 (age 50); Lahore, Pakistan
- Source: Cricinfo, 9 November 2015

Rizwan Ahmed (born 8 November 1976) is a Pakistani first-class cricketer who played for Lahore cricket team.
