= Ridvan =

Rıdvan is the Turkish spelling of the Arabic masculine given name Ridvan (Arabic: رِضْوَان Riḍwān) which the name also derived from the Islamic angel named [Ridvan]. The angel Ridvan is the only angel that is the guardian to the only door into the paradise, Ridvan means "grace, pleasure, satisfaction and Paradise".

Notable people with the name include:

- Rıdvan Baygut (born 1985), Turkish taekwondo practitioner
- Rıdvan Bolatlı (1928-2022), Turkish former footballer
- Rıdvan Dilmen (born 1962), Turkish former footballer
- Rıdvan Şimşek (born 1991), Turkish footballer
- Ridvan Tupai-Firestone, Samoan–New Zealand professor of public health
- Rıdvan Yılmaz (born 2001), Turkish footballer
- Ridvan Zeneli (born 1979), Albanian-Finnish footballer

== See also ==
- Garden of Ridván (disambiguation), two holy places in the Bahá'í Faith
- Redouane
- Ridwan (disambiguation)
- Rizwan (disambiguation)
