= Abd al-Haqq =

ʻAbd al-Ḥaqq (ALA-LC romanization of Arabic: عبد الحقّ) is an Arabic male given name, and in modern usage, surname. It is built from the Arabic words ʻabd and al-Ḥaqq, one of the names of God in the Qur'an, which give rise to the Muslim theophoric names. It means "servant of the Truth". Another spelling is Abdelhaq.

It may refer to:

== People ==
- Abd al-Haqq I (1157–1217), Marinid sheikh (Morocco)
  - Uthman ibn Abd al-Haqq (1196–1240), son of Abd al-Haqq I
  - Muhammad ibn Abd Al-Haqq (1202–1244), son of Abd al-Haqq I
  - Abu Yahya ibn Abd al-Haqq (died 1258), son of Abd al-Haqq I
  - Abu Yusuf Yaqub ibn Abd Al-Haqq (1212–1286), son of Abd al-Haqq I
- Abu Mohammed Abd el-Hakh Ibn Sabin (1217–1269), Spanish Sufi philosopher
- Abdul-Haqq Dehlavi (1551–1642), Indian scholar
- Abdul Haq, birth name of Iranian calligrapher Amanat Khan Shirazi (1570–1644 or 1645)
- Abdülhak Hâmid Tarhan (1851–1937), Turkish playwright and poet
- Maulvi Abdul Haq (Urdu scholar) (1872–1961), Pakistani Urdu-language scholar
- Abdülhak Adnan Adıvar (1882–1955), Turkish politician
- Miangul Abdul-Haqq Jahan Zeb, or just Miangul Jahan Zeb (1908–1987), ruler of Swat (Pakistan)
- Abdul Haq Akorwi (1912–1988), founder of Darul Uloom Haqqania.
- Mehr Abdul Haq (1915–1995), Pakistani linguist
- Abdul Haque (1918–1997), Bangladeshi author
- Abdul Haque (politician, born 1920) (1920–1995), Bengali revolutionary and politician
- Abdul Haque (Dinajpur politician)
- Abdul Hoque (1930–1971), Bangladeshi politician
- Abdul Haq Azmi (1928–2016), former Shaykh al-Hadith of Darul Uloom Deoband
- Abdul Haq Ansari (1931–2012), Indian religious scholar
- Abdelhak Mrini (1934–2025), Moroccan historian, civil servant and writer
- Shaher Abdulhak (1938–2020), Yemeni businessman
- Abd al Haqq Kielan (born 1941), Swedish imam
- Abdul Haq (Afghan leader) (1958–2001), Afghan leader against both the communists and the Taliban
- Abdelhak Achik (born 1959), Moroccan featherweight boxer (1988 Olympics)
- Huda bin Abdul Haq (1960–2008), Indonesian executed for terrorism
- Abdelhak Benchikha (born 1963), Algerian football manager
- Mohamed Abdelhak Achik, or just Mohammed Achik (born 1965), Moroccan bantamweight boxer (1992 Olympics)
- Abdul Haq al-Turkistani (born 1971), Uyghur Islamic militant and current leader of the Islamic extremist group Turkistan Islamic Party
- Abdul Haq Wasiq (born 1971), Afghan held in Guantanamo
- Mohammed Abdelhak Zakaria (born 1974), Moroccan-Bahraini runner
- Abdul-Haq, Muslim name of Anthony Small (born 1981), British boxer
- Abdelhaq Ait Laarif (born 1983), Moroccan footballer
- Abdul Haq Bin Seidu Osman, or just Abdul Osman (born 1987), Ghanaian-English footballer
- Abdul Haq Shafaq (born 1961), Afghan politician
- Abdelhak Layada (born 1959), Algerian Islamic militant
- Abdul Haque Faridi (1903–1996), Bangladeshi academic
- Mohammad Abdul Haque (1918–1996), Bangladeshi politician
- Md. Abdul Haque, Bangladeshi politician

== Abdelhaq ==
- Abdelhaq Ait Laarif (born 1983), Moroccan footballer
- Abdelhaq Nadir (born 1993), Moroccan boxer
- Abdelhaq Sari, Canadian politician

== See also ==
- Haqq (surname)
