= Marinid Tombs =

Historic site in Fez, Morocco

Coordinates: 34°4′11.16″N 4°58′45.27″W

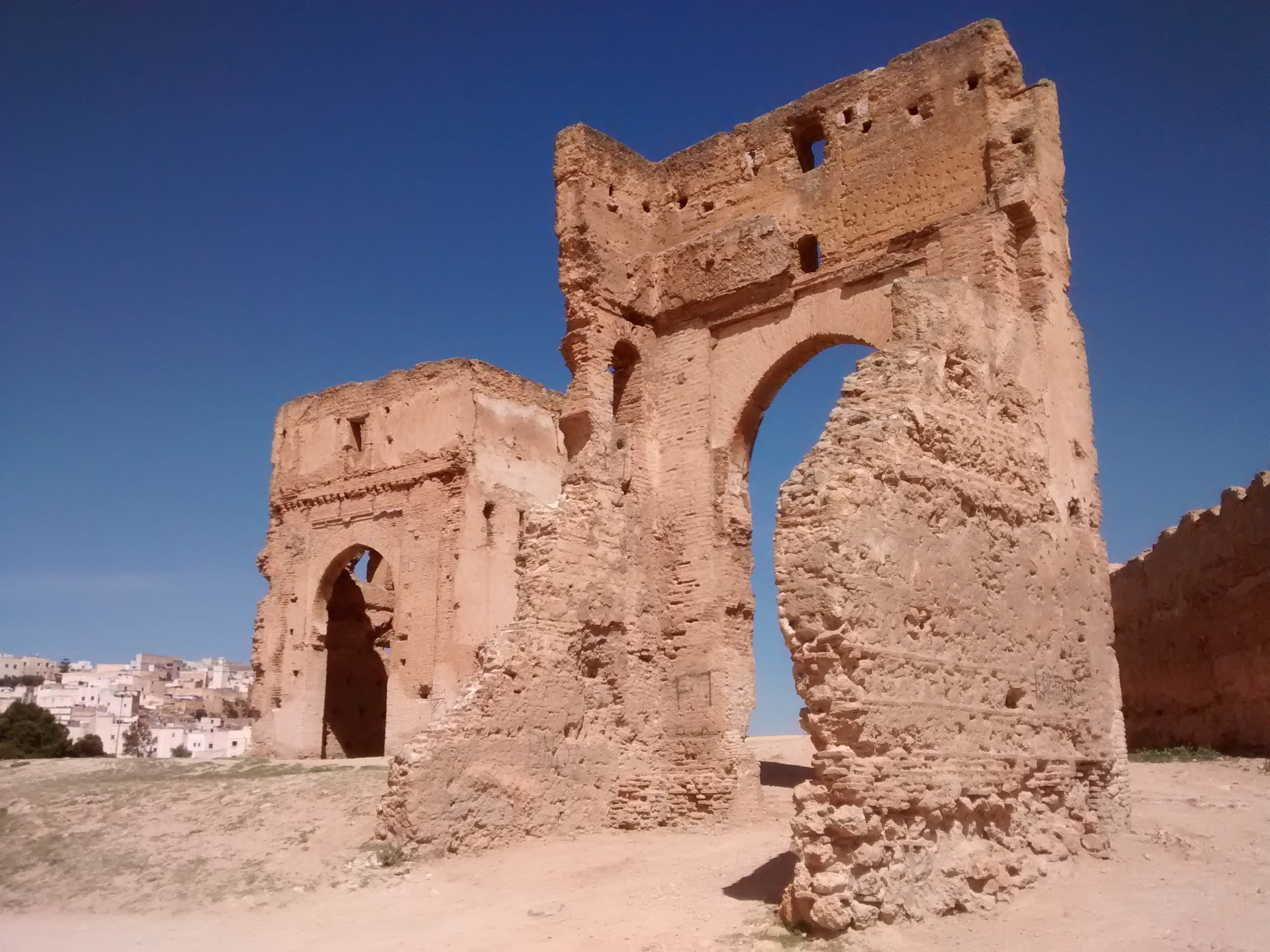
Marinid Tombs

The Marinid Tombs or Merenid Tombs are a set of ruined monumental tombs on a hill above and north of Fes al-Bali, the old city of Fez, Morocco. They were originally a royal necropolis for the Marinid dynasty which ruled over Morocco in the 13th to 15th centuries. Today, they are a popular lookout point over the historic city.

== Historical background ==
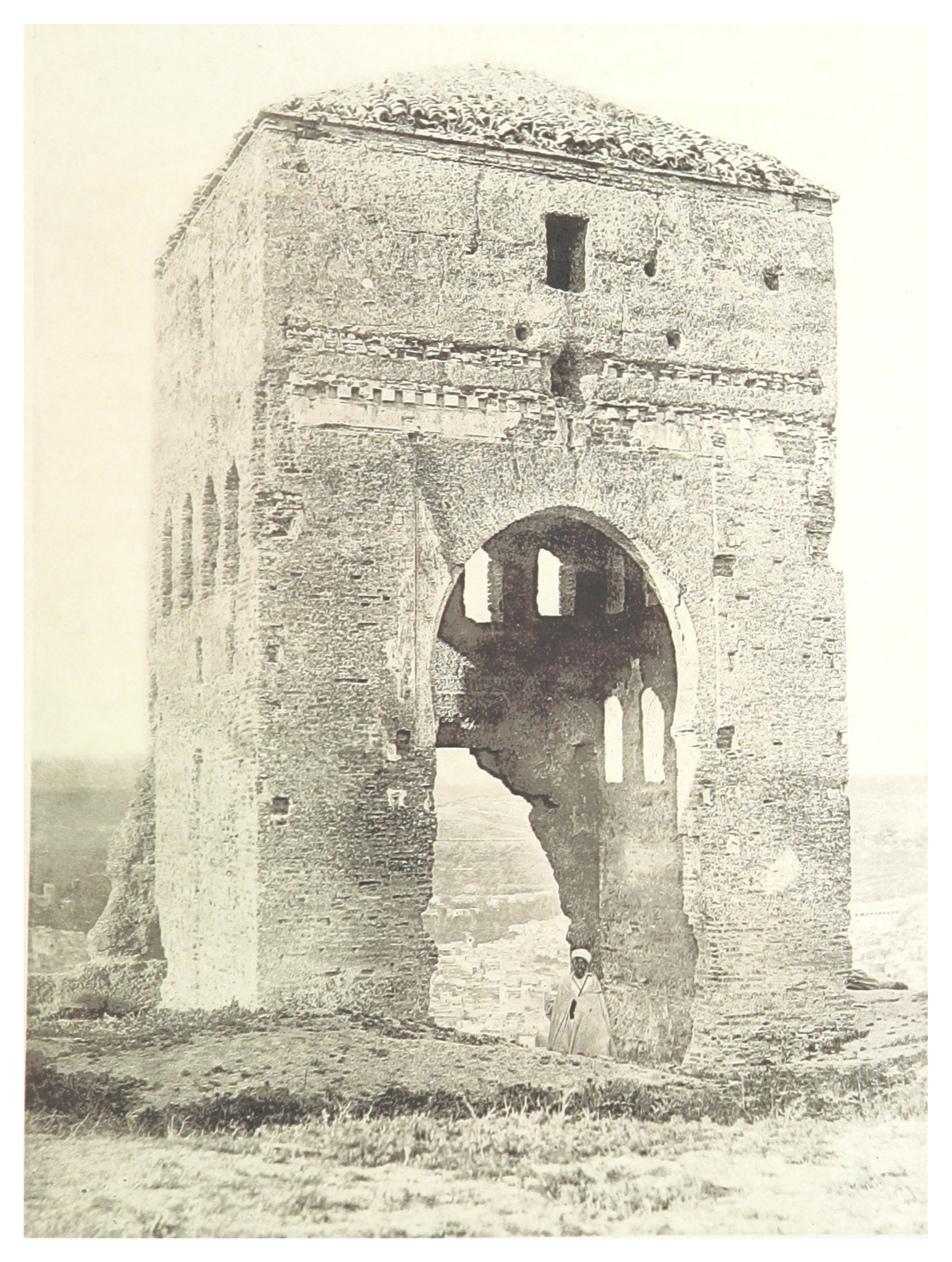
A photograph of the tombs in 1881

There is sparse information available on the site and its history. However, the ruined tombs are attributed to the 14th century, during the Marinid dynasty (13th–15th centuries), hence their name.

The Marinids conquered Fez in 1250 (CE) and turned it into their capital, eventually cementing this status by building a new fortified palace-city, Fes el-Jdid, in 1276 alongside the existing old city (Fes el-Bali). Before the foundation of Fes el-Jdid, however, the Marinids established a fortified palace on the hill to the north of Fes el-Bali known as al-Qula (today also known as the "Hill of the Marinids"). This palace also included a mosque (remnants of which, including a mihrab, survived until modern times) and a bathhouse (hammam). Some sources attribute these structures, or a predecessor of these structures, to the earlier reign of the Almohad caliph Muhammad al-Nasir (ruled 1199–1213), who was also responsible for rebuilding the city walls. Another author attributes the construction of the al-Qula palace to after 1287, around the same time that the Marinids created the Mosara Garden to the north of Fes el-Jdid. While it has not been possible to reconstruct the layout and appearance of the palace, the historical chronicler Leo Africanus claimed that the palace was impressive.

A royal necropolis eventually developed on this site, where some other tombs may have already existed as early as the 11th and 12th centuries (perhaps connected to the nearby Bab Guissa Cemetery). According to the Rawd al-Qirtas, the founder of the Marinid dynasty, Abu Muhammad Abd al-Haqq I (d. 1217), was buried at Tafirtast, a site near Meknes and close to where he had fallen in battle. Up until the middle of the 14th century the Marinid dynasty then buried its rulers in the royal necropolis at Chellah, just outside Rabat. Sultan Abu Inan, however, was interred in the Grand Mosque of Fes el-Jdid upon his death in 1358 and after this his successors, starting with Ibrahim ibn Ali, were buried in the necropolis on the al-Qula hill next to the Marinid palace there. (Only one of them was again buried at Chellah, which otherwise became abandoned.) They continued to be interred on this hill between 1361 and 1398 and then again at the end of the dynasty in 1465, when Abd al-Haqq II was buried here. Two Marinid stelae (tombstones) were discovered near this site in the 20th century: one belonged to a young princess called Zineb who died in 1335 and the other belonged to a high official named Abu Ali al-Nasir who died at beginning of the same century. The two stelae are now kept at the Dar Batha Museum in Fes.

== Description ==
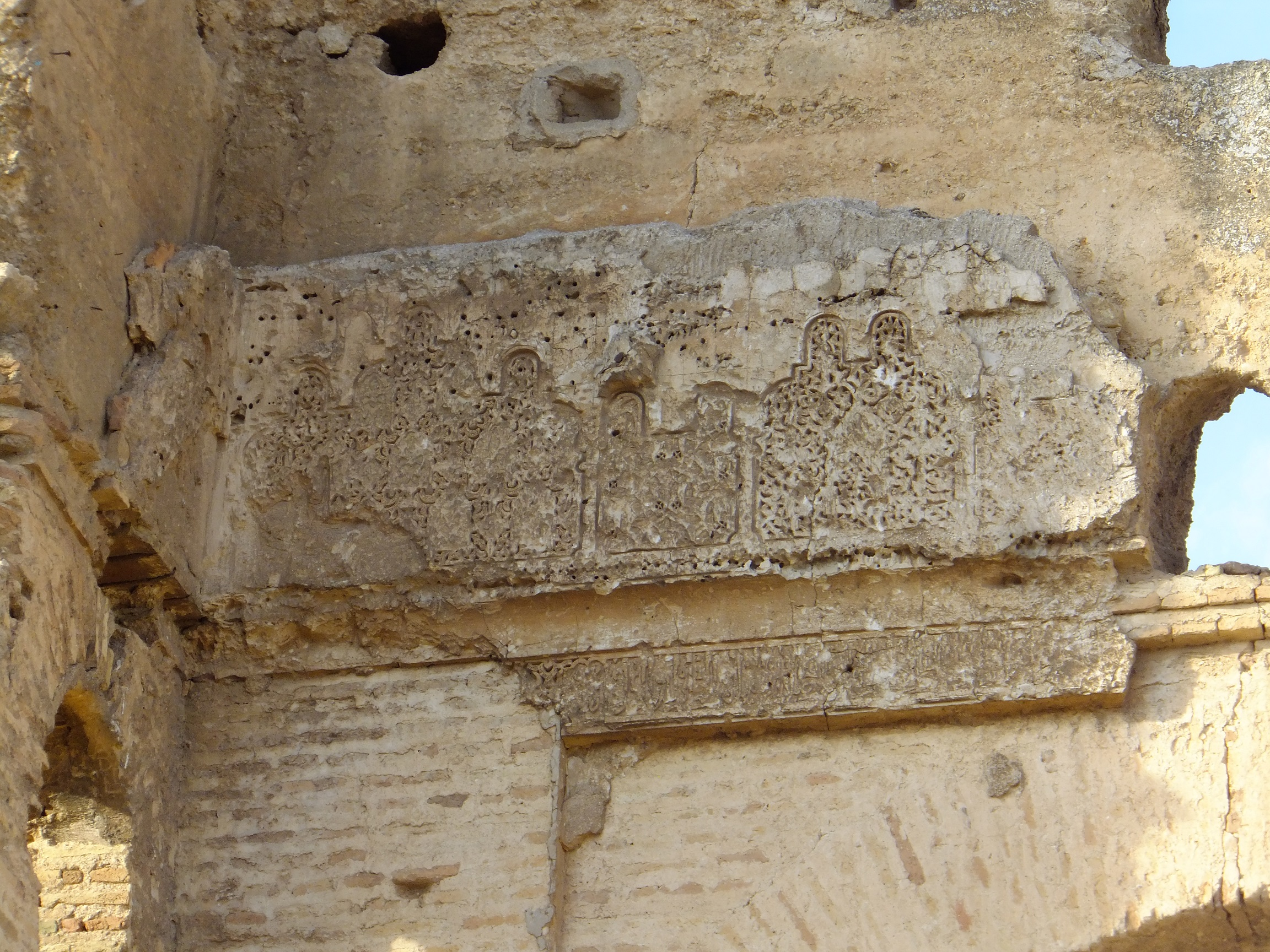
Remains of arabesque decoration and an Arabic inscription, both carved in stucco, inside one of the large tombs

Today the ruins of two tall rectangular-base mausoleums with large horseshoe-arch entrances are still visible, along with the remains of other structures. The two rectangular mausoleums were once covered by pyramidal wooden roofs covered in green tiles, as evidenced by 19th-century photographs. It is not known exactly who was buried here but given their monumentality they were probably meant for members of the royal family. Some fragments of carved stucco decoration and an Arabic inscription can still be seen on the walls of the mausoleums, which is all that remains of their once rich ornamentation. Leo Africanus mentioned that the tombs were heavily decorated and featured lavish and colourful marble epitaphs. The site was probably once enclosed by a wall, giving it the form of a rawda, an enclosed funerary garden or private cemetery in the Islamic tradition.

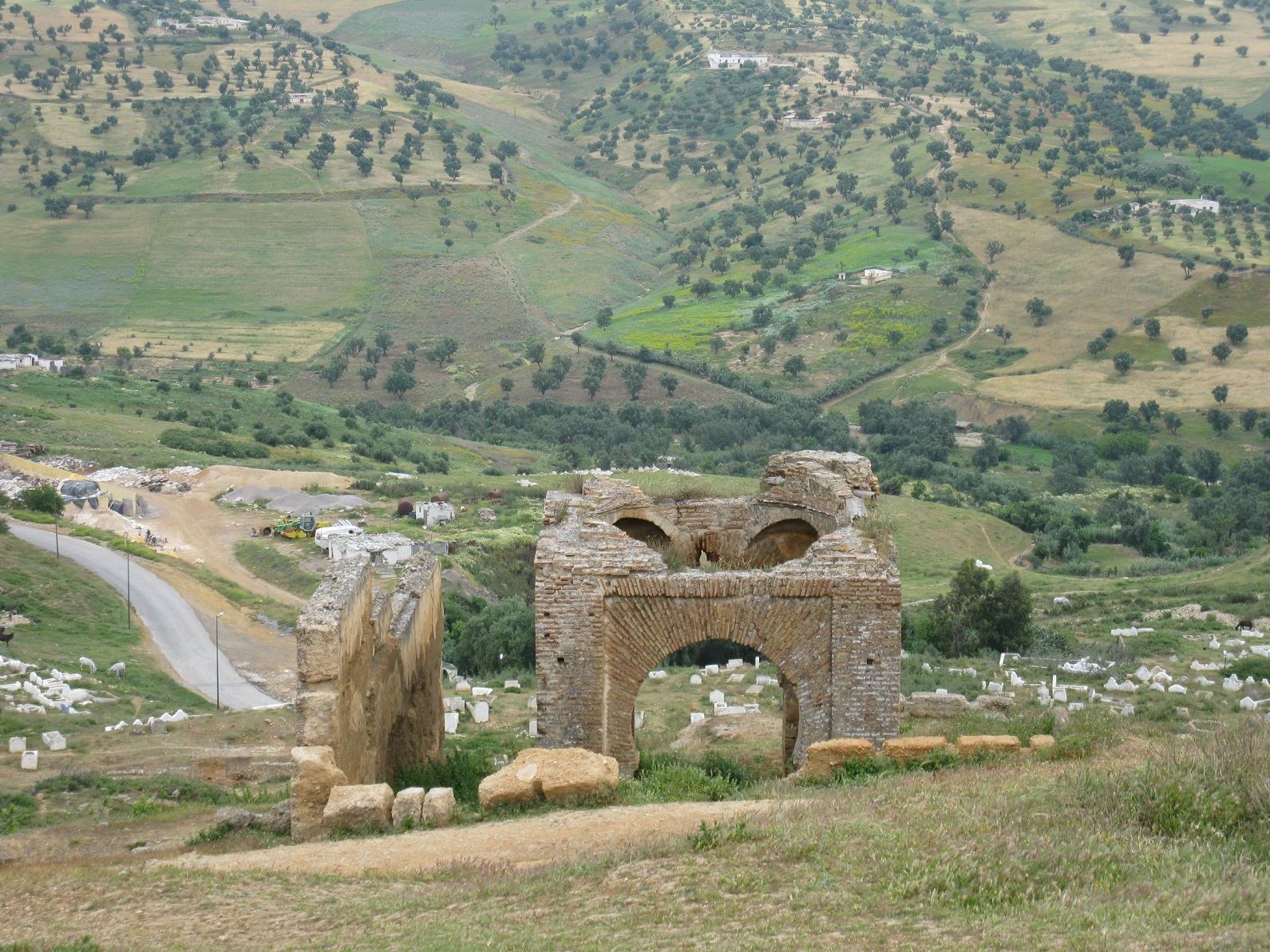
Ruins of a qubba (domed tomb) behind the main tombs, with part of the Bab Guissa Cemetery in the background

Among the other structures evident on the hill today is smaller qubba (domed structure) with a square base situated behind and slightly north of the two larger structures, on lower ground. Each of its four walls opens through a horseshoe arch. It was once covered by a dodecagonal (12-sided) dome that rested on four squinches. The dome itself no longer exists today, but it was described in Georges Marçais's 1954 study. It's not known who was buried here either, or if the burials even belonged to members of the dynasty. The mausoleum stood inside a square enclosure while another rectangular enclosure was attached on its east side, with remains of both enclosing walls still visible today. The eastern enclosure may have served as a forecourt to the mausoleum. This layout appears to have parallels with the layout of the Rawda mausoleum in the Alhambra (Granada, Spain) as well the Marinid-built mausoleum of the complex of Sidi Abu Madyan (Sidi Boumediene) in Tlemcen (Algeria), both dating from the 14th century.

The hillsides around the tombs (mostly to the north and east) are still occupied by the sprawling Bab Guissa Cemetery (named after the nearby city gate, Bab Guissa), though the graves visible today are likely much more recent. Today the site is well-known as a lookout with panoramic views over the old city of Fez, popular at sunset, and often mentioned in guidebooks and tourist literature. In addition to the views, it is also a notable place to hear the call to prayer (adhan) broadcasting simultaneously from all the mosques in the old city.

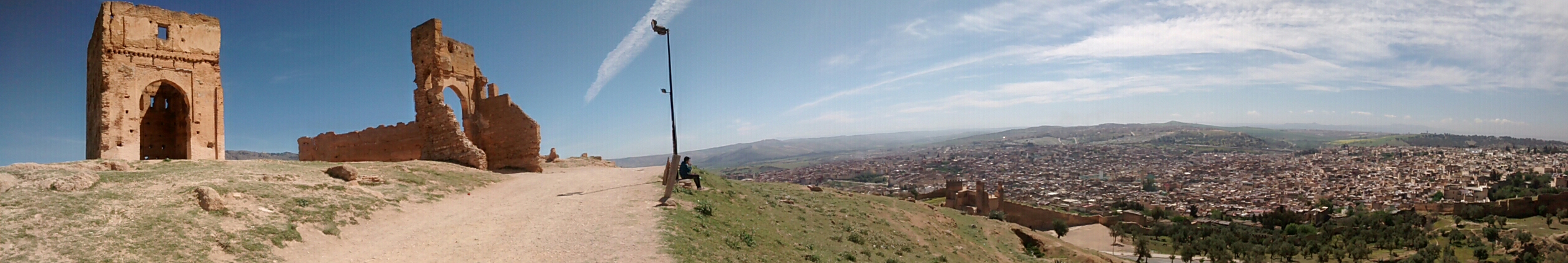
The Marinid Tombs and the view of the medina of Fez below

== Notable burials ==
The burials on the site are not well documented, but according to historical sources the following Marinid rulers (and perhaps others) were buried here:

- Abu Salim Ibrahim (d. 28 September 1361)
- Abu 'l-Abbas Ahmad II (d. 12 November 1393)
- Abu Faris Abd al-Aziz II (d. 11 November 1396)
- Abu 'Amir Abdallah (d. 20/21 March 1398)
- Abu Muhammad Abd al-Haqq II (d. 1465; the last Marinid sultan)

Two burials are known directly from marble tombstones discovered at the site (now kept at the Dar Batha Museum), although they do not belong to rulers:

- Zineb (or Zaynab), a Marinid princess (d. 1335)
- Abu Ali al-Nasir, a Marinid high official, who died at the beginning of the 14th century

== Conservation and archaeology ==
Very few remnants of the Marinid palace complex here have survived, in part due to continuous quarrying over the centuries and to more recent constructions. As of 2014, no thorough archaeological excavations had yet been carried out on the site of the tombs.

In August 2024, the ADER-Fès agency (a government-affiliated organisation dedicated to conservation in the city) announced that it was planning to embark on a major restoration project at the site.

== See also ==
- Borj Nord – nearby monument
- Borj Sud – well-known lookout area on the opposite side of the old city
- Bab Ftouh – southern gate and major cemetery of Fes el-Bali
- Moulay Abdallah Mosque – more recent royal necropolis in Fez
