= Mrini =

Mrini is a surname. Notable people with the surname include:

- Abdelhak Mrini (1934–2025), Moroccan historian, civil servant and writer
- Driss Mrini (born 1950), Moroccan film and television director, producer and writer
