= Anselm Turmeda =

Majorcan friar, translator and Muslim writer (c. 1355 – c. 1423)

- Woodcut portrait of Anselm Turmeda, cropped from the title page of Fray Anselmo de Turmeda (1719)

Personal life
- Born: Anselm Turmeda c. 1352–1355 Palma, Kingdom of Majorca, Crown of Aragon
- Died: c. 1423–1432 (after September 1423) Tunis, Hafsid Sultanate
- Resting place: Souk as-Sarradjin, near Bab al-Manara, Tunis (known as Sidi Tuhfa)
- Spouse: Daughter of al-Hajj Muhammad al-Saffar
- Children: Several children (including eldest son Muhammad)
- Notable works: Llibre dels bons amonestaments (1398); Cobles de la divisió del Regne de Mallorques (1398); Profecies (1404–1407); Disputa de l'ase (1417–1418); Llibre de tres (attributed); Tuhfat al-Adib fi al-Radd 'ala Ahl al-Salib (تحفة الأريب في الرد على أهل الصليب, 1420)
- Education: Studies in Lleida, Bologna, and possibly Paris
- Other names: ʿAbd Allāh al-Tarjumān, Abdallah at-Tarjuman
- Occupation: Writer, translator, director of maritime customs, former Franciscan friar

Religious life
- Religion: Islam (from c. 1388)
- Order: Franciscan Order (formerly)
- Jurisprudence: Mālikī (likely)
- Creed: Ashʿarī (likely)
- Profession: Chief interpreter (dragoman) and maritime customs official

Anselm Turmeda (Catalan pronunciation: [ənˈsɛlm tuɾˈmɛðə]; c. 1352/1355 – 1423/1432), later known as Abd Allah at-Tarjuman (Arabic: عبد الله الترجمان), was a Majorcan Franciscan friar and deacon from Mallorca who converted to Islam and settled in Tunis. He is one of the earliest known writers to have produced major works in both Arabic and a Romance language (Catalan). He served as chief interpreter and director of the maritime customs in Hafsid Tunis, where he died during the reign of Sultan Abu Faris Abd al-Aziz al-Mutawakkil.

== Biography ==
=== Early life and education ===
Anselm Turmeda was born in Palma, Mallorca (then known as Ciutat de Mallorca), around 1352–1354. He was the only son of a respected citizen; his father or godfather, Pere Silvestre, was a member of the local weavers' guild.

At the age of six, Turmeda began studying Latin, grammar, and logic under a local priest. At fourteen (c. 1366), he entered the University of Lleida in Catalonia, where he studied natural sciences and astrology. He subsequently joined the Franciscan Order at the monastery of Montblanch. By 1378, he traveled to Italy to study theology at the University of Bologna, where he spent ten years under the instruction of the Dominican master Nicola da Moimacco (identified as Nicolao Martello in his Arabic autobiography). On 3 June 1379, during a visit to Mallorca, he was ordained as a Franciscan deacon in Palma Cathedral by Bishop Pere Cima.

=== Travel to Tunis and conversion to Islam ===
Around 1387–1388, after spending six months in Mallorca and five months in Sicily, Turmeda sailed to Tunis, the capital of the Hafsid Kingdom. Upon arrival, he spent four months as a guest of Christian merchants, likely lodging at the local Franciscan convent.

Seeking an audience at the Hafsid court, Turmeda met Yusuf al-Tabib ("Yusuf the Physician"), a court doctor and Muslim convert. Yusuf introduced him to the Hafsid Sultan, Abu al-Abbas Ahmad II (r. 1370–1394). In an audience before the sultan and invited Christian witnesses, Turmeda publicly professed faith in Islam. He adopted the Muslim name ʿAbd Allāh ("Servant of God") and became known as ʿAbd Allāh al-Tarjumān ("ʿAbd Allāh the Interpreter/Dragoman"). He married the daughter of Hajj Muhammad al-Saffar, with whom he had several children, including his eldest son, Muhammad.

=== Administrative career and diplomacy ===
Fluent in Catalan, Latin, Italian, French, Arabic, Hebrew, and Castilian, ʿAbd Allāh served as chief interpreter and director of the Maritime Customs Office (dār al-mukhtaṣṣ) in Tunis. He retained his administrative responsibilities under Sultan Abu al-Abbas Ahmad II and his successor, Sultan Abu Faris Abd al-Aziz (r. 1394–1433).

His diplomatic duties included translating official correspondence, overseeing maritime customs revenues, and interpreting during treaty negotiations between the Hafsid state and European powers including Genoa, Venice, Pisa, Florence, and the Crown of Aragon. During the Franco-Genoese Siege of Mahdia (1390), he accompanied Hafsid forces and served as a dragoman negotiating between the besieging commanders and the defenders. He was also involved in negotiating the redemption of Muslim and Christian captives.

=== Papal offers and later years ===
Throughout his residence in Tunis, several Christian authorities attempted to persuade Turmeda to abjure Islam and return to Christian lands:

- 1402: Roger de Montcada, Viceroy of Sicily, sent a messenger offering him a safe-conduct and pardon if he returned.
- 1412: Antipope Benedict XIII signed a papal diploma offering him absolution from apostasy.
- 1414: Aicard de Mur, Governor of Sardinia, and King Ferdinand I of Aragon sent gifts and correspondence.
- 1421 & 1423: King Alfonso V of Aragon issued letters granting him safe-conduct to travel freely throughout Aragonese realms with his family and goods.

Turmeda declined these offers and remained in Tunis until his death, which occurred between 1423 and 1432. His tomb, located at the entrance of Souk as-Sarradjin near Bab al-Manara in the Medina of Tunis, became a local venerated site known as Sidi Tuhfa or Sidi al-Sarsent.

== Works ==
=== Catalan works ===
- Llibre dels bons amonestaments (1398): A didactic poem composed in Tunis comprising 428 verses arranged in 107 quatrains. Adapting the 13th-century Italian text Dottrina dello Schiavo di Bari, it presents moral precepts and satire, including the well-known stanza praising money (Elogi del diner). It was widely used as a primary school text in Catalonia for over three centuries under the title Franselm.
- Cobles de la divisió del Regne de Mallorques (1398): A poem written at the request of Majorcan merchants in Tunis urging civic unity and peace among political factions in Mallorca.
- Disputa de l'ase (1417–1418): A satirical Catalan prose work depicting a debate between Friar Anselm and a mangy donkey over whether humans possess inherent nobility over animals. The narrative structure draws from an Arabic fable in Epistle 21 of the 10th-century encyclopedia of the Brethren of Purity (Ikhwān al-Ṣafāʾ), while zoological details draw from Bartholomeus Anglicus's De proprietatibus rerum. The donkey refutes eighteen arguments on human superiority before Friar Anselm wins on the nineteenth argument regarding the Incarnation of Christ. Banned by the Spanish Inquisition in 1583, the original Catalan text was lost and later reconstructed from a 1544 French translation.
- Llibre de tres: A humorous collection of aphorisms grouped in triads, traditionally attributed to Turmeda.

=== Arabic works ===
- Tuhfat al-Adib fi al-Radd 'ala Ahl al-Salib (1420): Completed in Tunis in 823 AH (1420 CE), this work (often abbreviated as the Tuḥfa) is Turmeda's chief Arabic treatise. It is divided into three sections:
1. An autobiography detailing his education in Mallorca, Lleida, and Bologna, and his conversion to Islam in Tunis.
2. A chronicle of Hafsid rulers, highlighting the accomplishments and public works of Sultan Abu al-Abbas Ahmad II and Sultan Abu Faris Abd al-Aziz.
3. A systematic refutation of Christian theology and dogmas (including the Trinity and Incarnation), alongside an argument that biblical references to the Paraclete predict the prophethood of Muhammad.
