= Al-Wathiq (name) =

Al-Wathiq الواثق
- Pronunciation: al-Wathiq billah al-Wathiq
- Gender: Male

Origin
- Origin: Semitic (Arabic)
- Meaning: He who trusts in God
- Region of origin: Arabia (Middle East)

Al-Wathiq (Arabic: الواثق) was the ninth Abbasid caliph, ruling from 842 to his death in 847.

The name can also refer to:

- al-Wathiq I (died after 1341), Caliph of Mamluk Cairo in 1340–1341
- al-Wathiq II (died 1386), Caliph of Mamluk Cairo in 1383–1386
- Idris al-Wathiq (died 1269), last Almohad ruler in 1266–1269
- Yahya II al-Wathiq (died 1279), Hafsid sultan of Ifriqiya in 1277–1279
- al-Wathiq al-Mutahhar (1303–1379/80), Zaydi imam of Yemen in 1349
- Muhammad ibn Ahmad al-Wathiq, Marinid sultan of Fez in 1386–1387
