= Abu al-Abbas Ahmad al-Mustansir =

Marinid Sultan from 1374 to 1384

Marinid Sultan (1st reign)
- Reign: 1374 – 1384
- Predecessor: Muhammad III ibn Abd al-Aziz
- Successor: Musa ibn Faris al-Mutawakkil

Marinid Sultan (2nd reign)
- Reign: 1387 – 1393
- Predecessor: Muhammad ibn Ahmad al-Wathiq
- Successor: Abd al-Aziz II ibn Ahmad II
- Died: 1393; Taza
- Dynasty: Marinid
- Father: Abu Faris Abd al-Aziz I
- Religion: Islam

Abu al-Abbas Ahmad ibn Abd al-Aziz (أبو العباس أحمد بن عبد العزيز), known by the regnal name al-Mustansir (المستنصر), was Marinid Sultan from 1374 to 1384.

== Life ==
Abu al-Abbas Ahmad's predecessor Muhammad Abu Zayyan had ascended the throne as a minor in 1372 on the death of his father, Abu Faris Abd al-Aziz. The Nasrid ruler Muhammed V of Granada sent two Marinid princes to Morocco whom he had been holding captive in Granada: Abu al-Abbas Ahmad and Abdul Rahman bin Yaflusin, and supported them in taking control of northern Morocco.

Abu al-Abbas Ahmad became the Sultan of Fez in 1374, while Abdul Rahman became the independent Sultan of Marrakesh. Ibn al-Khatib, a former vizier of Granada and distinguished man of letters, had taken refuge in Morocco. Abu al-Abbas Ahmad had him executed as Muhammed V wished, and handed over Sabta (Ceuta) to Muhammad V.

Abu al-Abbas Ahmad was temporarily replaced in 1384 by Musa ibn Faris al-Mutawakkil. His deposition was engineered by the Nasrids. Musa ibn Faris Abu Faris al-Mutawakkil was a disabled son of the former Sultan Abu Inan Faris. Musa ibn Faris ruled until 1386, and was replaced by Muhammad ibn Ahmad al-Wathiq, who ruled until 1387. Abu al-Abbas Ahmad then regained the throne. After his restoration, Abu al-Abbas Ahmad began to give more power to the viziers. While Morocco was at peace, Abu al-Abbas Ahmad reconquered Tlemcen and Algiers.

Abu al-Abbas Ahmad died in 1393 in Taza, and Abd al-Aziz II ibn Ahmad II was designated the new sultan. During the troubles that followed, the Christian sovereigns carried the war into Morocco.
