= Musa ibn Faris al-Mutawakkil =

Marinid Sultan from 1384 to 1386

Marinid Sultan
- Reign: 1384 – 1386
- Predecessor: Abul Abbas Ahmad Mustanzir
- Successor: Muhammad ibn Ahmad Abu Zayyan al-Wathiq
- Born: unknown
- Died: 1386
Names
- Musa ibn Faris Abu Faris al-Mutawakkil
- Dynasty: Marinid
- Religion: Islam

Musa ibn Faris al-Mutawakkil (Arabic: أبو فارس موسى المريني) (Musa ibn Faris Abu Faris al-Mutawakkil) was Marinid Sultan from 1384 to 1386.

== Life ==
Musa ibn Faris replaced the Sultan Abu'l-Abbas Ahmad al-Mustansir in 1384. His accession was engineered by the Nasrid dynasty of the Emirate of Granada. Musa ibn Faris was a disabled son of the former Sultan Abu Inan Faris. Musa Ben Faris ruled until 1386. He was replaced by Muhammad ibn Ahmad Abu Zayyan al-Wathiq, who ruled until 1387. Abul Abbas then regained the throne.
