= Muhammad III ibn Abd al-Aziz =

Marinid Sultan from 1372 to 1374

Marinid Sultan
- Reign: 1372 – 1374
- Predecessor: Abu Faris Abd al-Aziz I
- Successor: Ahmad ibn Ibrahim, al-Mustansir
- Born: 1368
- Died: 1374 (aged 5–6)
- Dynasty: Marinid
- Father: Abu Faris Abd al-Aziz I
- Religion: Islam

Abu Zayyan as-Sa'id Muhammad ibn Abd al-Aziz( Arabic: أبو زيان السيد محمد بن عبد العزيز), was Marinid Sultan from 1372 to 1374.

== Life ==
Muhammad Abu Zayyan ascended the throne as a minor on the death of his father, Sultan Abu Faris Abd al-Aziz. His father had befriended Lisan al-Din bin al-Khatib, former vizier of Muhammed V of Granada, and during Muhammad bin Abd al-Aziz's rule al-Khatib was safe.

Muhammed III sent two Marinid princes to Morocco whom he had been holding captive in Granada: Ahmad ibn Abd al-Aziz and Abdul Rahman bin Yaflusin, and supported them in taking control of northern Morocco. Muhammad Abu Zayyan was succeeded in 1374 by Abul Abbas Ahmad and Abd-al-Rahman. Abul-Abbas Ahmad (Mustanzir) became the Sultan of Fez, while Abdul Rahman became the independent Sultan of Marrakesh. Al-Khatib was imprisoned and in 1375 was strangled to death while in captivity.
