= Marinid dynasty =

Berber Muslim dynasty, 1244–1465

Marinid dynasty المرينيون al-marīniyyūn (ar)
- 1244–1465
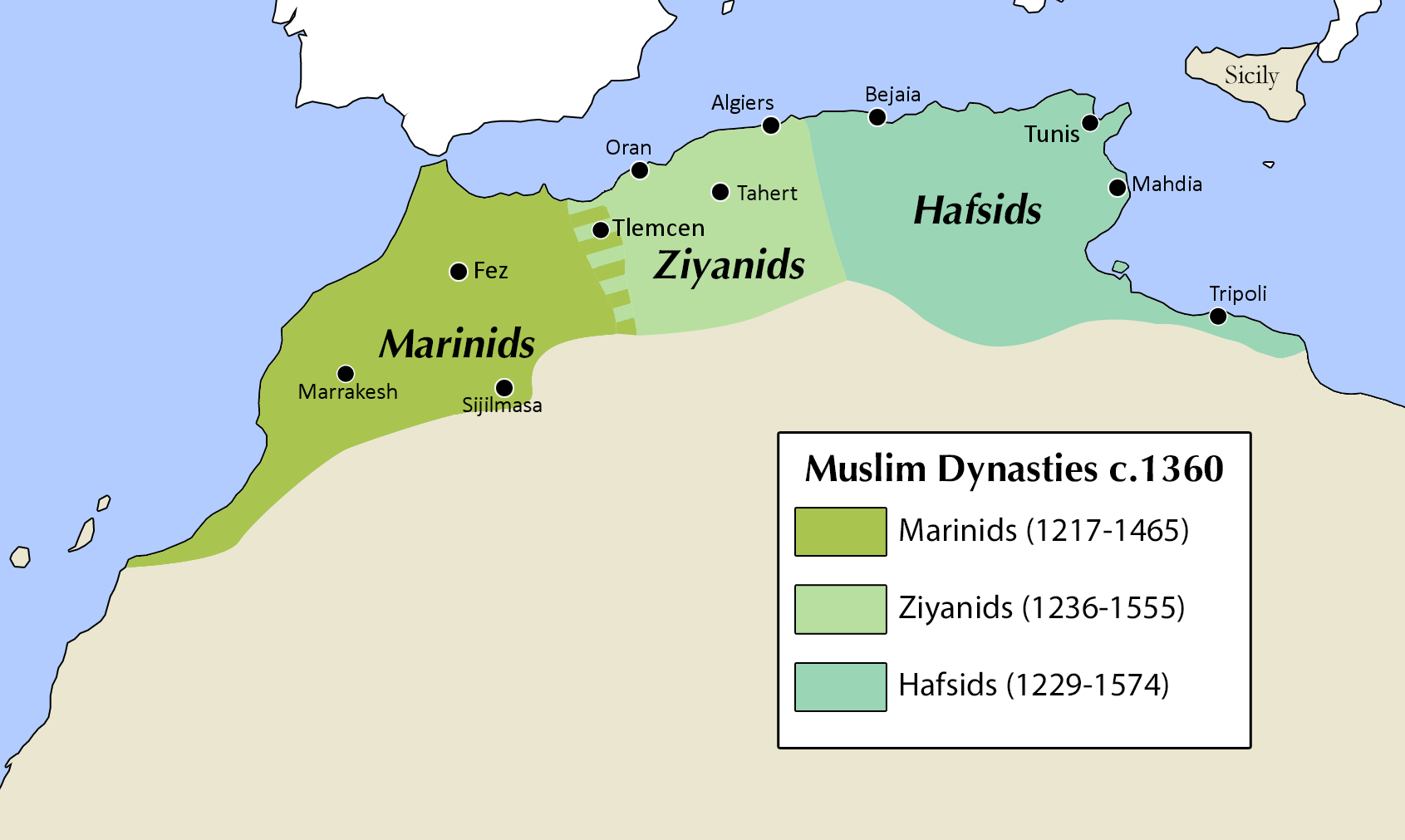
- The Marinid sultanate circa 1360
- Capital: Fez
- Official languages: Arabic
- Common languages: Maghrebi Arabic, Berber languages
- Religion: Sunni Islam
- Sultan
  - 1215–1217 (first): Abd al-Haqq I
  - 1420–1465 (last): Abd al-Haqq II
- History
  - Established: 1244
  - Disestablished: 1465
- Currency: Dinar
Preceded by	Succeeded by
Almohad Caliphate	Wattasid dynasty

The Marinid dynasty (Arabic: المرينيون, romanized: al-Marīniyyūn) was a Berber Zenata dynasty that ruled much of the Maghreb, chiefly present-day Morocco, from the mid-13th to the 15th century. At various times, they also extended their authority over parts of present-day Algeria, Tunisia, and southern Spain around Gibraltar. Although of Berber origin, the Marinid rulers were culturally Arabized. The dynasty takes its name from the Banū Marīn (Arabic: بنو مرين; Berber languages: Ayt Mrin), the Zenata Berber tribe from which it originated.

After being at their service for a brief period, the Marinids waged war during the 13th century to overthrow the Almohads, who ruled the western Maghreb, eventually succeeding in 1269 with the capture of Marrakesh. At the height of their power in the mid-14th century, during the reigns of Abu al-Hasan and his son Abu Inan, the Marinid dynasty briefly held sway over most of the Maghreb including large parts of modern-day Algeria and Tunisia. They supported the Emirate of Granada in al-Andalus in the 13th and 14th centuries and made an attempt to gain a direct foothold on the European side of the Strait of Gibraltar. They were however defeated at the Battle of Río Salado in 1340 and finished after the Castilians took Algeciras in 1344, definitively expelling them from the Iberian Peninsula. Starting in the early 15th century, the Wattasid dynasty, a related ruling house, competed with the Marinid dynasty for control of the state and became de facto rulers between 1420 and 1459 while officially acting as regents or viziers. In 1465 the last Marinid sultan, Abd al-Haqq II, was finally overthrown and killed by a revolt in Fez, which led to the establishment of direct Wattasid rule over most of Morocco.

In contrast to their predecessors, the Marinids sponsored Maliki Sunnism as the official religion and made Fez their capital. Under their rule, Fez enjoyed a relative golden age. The Marinids also pioneered the construction of madrasas across the country which promoted the education of Maliki ulama, although Sufi sheikhs increasingly predominated in the countryside. The influence of sharifian families and the popular veneration of sharifian figures such as the Idrisids also progressively grew in this period, preparing the way for later dynasties like the Saadians and Alawis.

== History ==
=== Origins ===
The Marinids were a faction of the Berber tribal confederation of the Zenata. The Banu Marin were nomads who originated from the Zab (a region around Biskra in modern-day Algeria). Following the arrival of Arab Bedouins in North Africa in the middle of the 11th-12th centuries, they were pushed to leave their lands in the region of Biskra. They moved to the north-west of present-day Algeria, before entering en masse into what is now Morocco by the beginning of the 13th century. The Banu Marin first frequented the area between Sijilmasa and Figuig, at times reaching as far as the Zab. They moved seasonally from the Figuig oasis to the Moulouya River basin.

According to Ibn Khaldun, the ancestors of the Banu Marin were the Banu Wasin.

The Marinids took their name from their ancestor, Marin ibn Wartajan al-Zenati. Like earlier Berber ruling dynasties of North Africa and Al-Andalus had done, and in order to help gain legitimacy for their rule, Marinid historiography claimed an Arab origin for the dynasty through a North Arabian tribe. The first leader of the Marinid dynasty, Abd al-Haqq I, was born in the Zab into a noble family. His great-grandfather, Abu Bakr, was a sheikh of the region.

=== Rise ===
After arriving in present-day Morocco, they initially submitted to the Almohad dynasty, which was at the time the ruling regime. Their leader Mahyu contributed to the Almohad victory at Battle of Alarcos in 1195, in central Iberian Peninsula, though he died of his wounds. His son and successor, Abd al-Haqq, was the effective founder of the Marinid dynasty. Later, the Almohads suffered a severe defeat against Christian kingdoms of Iberia on 16 July 1212 in the Battle of Las Navas de Tolosa. The severe loss of life at the battle left the Almohad state weakened and some of its regions somewhat depopulated. Starting in 1213 or 1214, the Marinids began to tax farming communities of today's north-eastern Morocco (the area between Nador and Berkane). The relationship between them and the Almohads became strained and starting in 1215, there were regular outbreaks of fighting between the two parties. In 1217 they tried to occupy the eastern part of present-day Morocco but were defeated by an Almohad army and Abd al-Haqq was killed. They were expelled, pulling back from the urban towns and settlements, while their leadership passed on to Uthman I and then Muhammad I. In the intervening years, they regrouped and managed to establish their authority again over the rural tribes in the regions around Taza, Fez, and Ksar el-Kebir. Meanwhile, the Almohads lost their territories in Al-Andalus to Christian kingdoms like Castile, the Hafsids of Ifriqiya broke away in 1229, followed by the independence of the Zayyanid dynasty of Tlemcen in 1235. The Almohad caliph Sa'id nonetheless managed to defeat the Marinids again in 1244, forcing them to retreat back to their original lands south of Taza.

It was under the leadership of Abu Yahya, whose reign began in 1244, that the Marinids re-entered into the region on a more deliberate campaign of conquest. Between 1244 and 1248 the Marinids were able to take Taza, Rabat, Salé, Meknes and Fez from the weakened Almohads. Meknes was captured in 1244 or 1245, Fez was captured in 1248, and Sijilmassa in 1255. The Almohad caliph, Sa'id, managed to reassert his authority briefly in 1248 by coming north with an army to confront them, at which point Abu Yahya formally submitted to him and retreated to a fortress in the Rif. However, in June of the same year the caliph was ambushed and killed by the Zayyanids in a battle to the south of Oujda. The Marinids intercepted the defeated Almohad army on its return, and the Christian mercenaries serving under the Almohads entered the service of the Marinids instead. Abu Yahya quickly reoccupied his previously conquered cities the same year, and established his capital in Fes. His successor, Abu Yusuf Yaqub (1259–1286) captured Marrakesh in 1269, effectively ending Almohad rule.

=== Apogee ===
After the Nasrids of Granada ceded the town of Algeciras to the Marinids, Abu Yusuf went to Al-Andalus to support the ongoing struggle against the Kingdom of Castile. The Marinid dynasty then tried to extend its control to include the commercial traffic of the Strait of Gibraltar.

It was in this period that Iberian Christians were first able to take the fighting across the Strait of Gibraltar to what is today Morocco: in 1260 and 1267 they attempted an invasion, but both attempts were defeated.

After gaining a foothold in the city of Algeciras in the southern tip of the Iberian Peninsula, the Marinids became active in the conflict between Muslims and Christians in Iberia. To gain absolute control of the trade in the Strait of Gibraltar from their base at Algeciras, they conquered several nearby Iberian towns: by the year 1294 they had occupied Rota, Tarifa, and Gibraltar.

In 1276, they founded the North African city of Fes Jdid, which they made their administrative and military center. While Fes had been a prosperous city throughout the Almohad period, even becoming the largest city in the world during that time, it was in the Marinid period that Fes reached its golden age, a period which marked the beginning of an official, historical narrative for the city. It is from the Marinid period that Fes' reputation as an important intellectual centre largely dates and the Marinids established the first madrasas in Morocco here during this time.

Despite internal infighting, Abu Said Uthman II (r. 1310–1331) initiated huge construction projects across the land. Several madrasas were built, the Al-Attarine Madrasa being the most famous. The building of these madrasas were necessary to create a dependent bureaucratic class, in order to undermine the marabouts and Sharifian elements.

The Marinids also strongly influenced the policy of the Emirate of Granada, from which they enlarged their army in 1275. In the 13th century, the Kingdom of Castile made several incursions into their territory. In 1260, Castilian forces raided Salé and, in 1267, initiated a full-scale invasion, but the Marinids repelled them.

At the height of their power, during the rule of Abu al-Hasan Ali (r. 1331–1348), the Marinid army was large and disciplined. It consisted of 40,000 Zenata cavalry, while Arab nomads contributed to the cavalry and Andalusians were included as archers. The personal bodyguard of the sultan consisted of 7,000 men, and included Christian, Kurdish and Black African elements. Under Abu al-Hasan another attempt was made to reunite the Maghreb. In 1337 the Abdalwadid kingdom of Tlemcen was conquered, followed in 1347 by the defeat of the Hafsid empire in Ifriqiya, which made him master of a huge territory, which spanned from southern present-day Morocco to Tripoli. However, within the next year, a revolt of Arab tribes in southern Tunisia made them lose their eastern territories. The Marinids had already suffered a crushing defeat at the hands of a Portuguese-Castilian coalition in the Battle of Río Salado in 1340, and finally had to withdraw from Andalusia, only holding on to Algeciras until 1344.

In 1348, Abu al-Hasan was deposed by his son Abu Inan Faris, who tried to reconquer Algeria and Tunisia. Despite several successes, he was strangled by his own vizir in 1358, after which the dynasty began to decline.

=== Decline ===
After the death of Abu Inan Faris in 1358, the real power lay with the viziers, while the Marinid sultans were paraded and forced to succeed each other in quick succession. The county was divided and political anarchy set in, with different viziers and foreign powers supporting different factions. In 1359 Hintata tribesmen from the High Atlas came down and occupied Marrakesh, capital of their Almohad ancestors, which they would govern independently until 1526. To the south of Marrakesh, Sufi mystics claimed autonomy, and in the 1370s Azemmour broke off under a coalition of merchants and Arab clan leaders of the Banu Sabih. To the east, the Zianid and Hafsid families reemerged and to the north, the Europeans were taking advantage of this instability by attacking the coast. Meanwhile, unruly wandering Arab Bedouin tribes increasingly spread anarchy, which accelerated the decline of the empire.

In the 15th century, it was hit by a financial crisis, after which the state had to stop financing the different marabouts and Sharifian families, which had previously been useful instruments in controlling different tribes. The political support of these marabouts and Sharifians halted, and it splintered into different entities. In 1399 Tetouan was taken by Castile and its population was massacred and in 1415 the Portuguese captured Ceuta. After Sultan Abdalhaqq II (1421–1465) tried to break the power of the Wattasids, he was executed.

Marinid rulers after 1420 came under the control of the Wattasids, who exercised a regency as Abd al-Haqq II became Sultan one year after his birth. The Wattasids however refused to give up the Regency after Abd al-Haqq came to age.

In 1459, Abd al-Haqq II managed a massacre of the Wattasid family, breaking their power. His reign, however, brutally ended as he was murdered during the 1465 revolt. This event saw the end of the Marinid dynasty as Muhammad ibn Ali Amrani-Joutey, leader of the Sharifs, was proclaimed Sultan in Fes. He was in turn overthrown in 1471 by Abu Abd Allah al-Sheikh Muhammad ibn Yahya, one of the two the surviving Wattasids from the 1459 massacre, who instigated the Wattasid dynasty.

=== Chronology of events ===
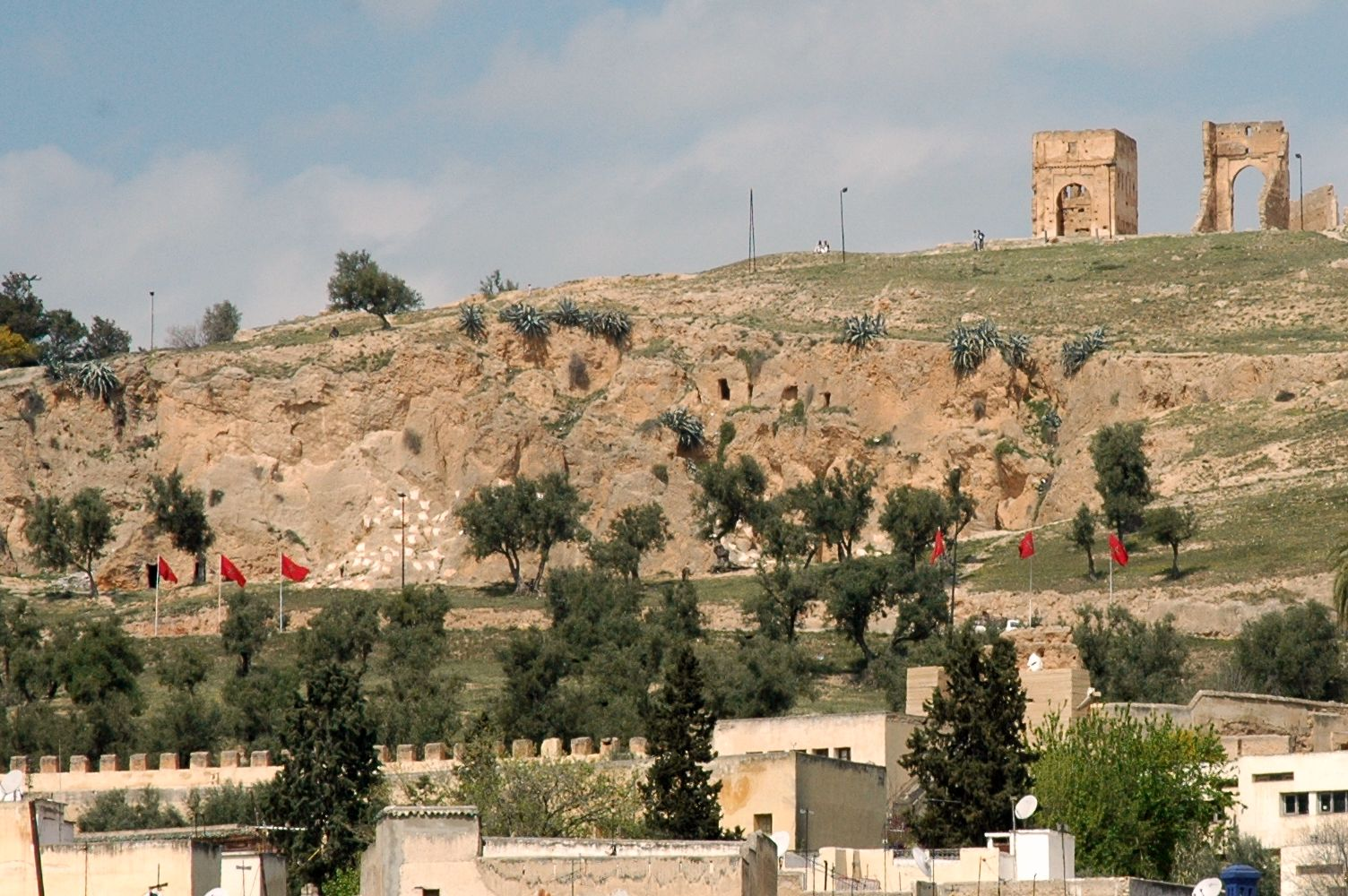
The Marinid Tombs in Fez, Morocco

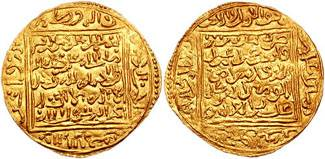
Coin minted during the reign of Abu Inan Faris (1348–1358)

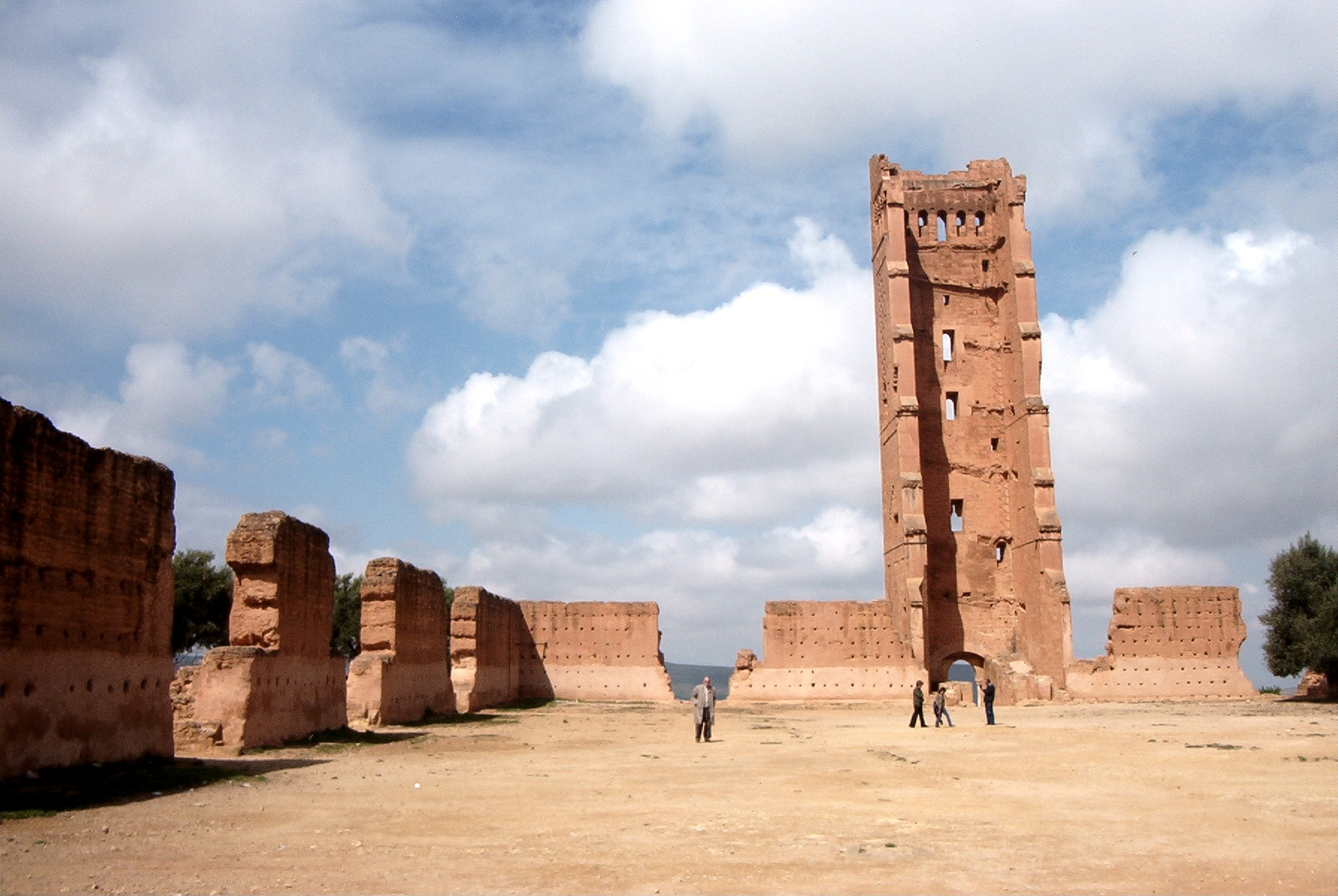
Remnants of the city of al-Mansourah constructed by the Marinids during their siege of Tlemcen.

- 1215: The Banu Marin (Marinids) attacks the Almohads when the 16-year-old Almohad caliph Yusuf II Al-Mustansir comes to power in 1213. The battle takes place on the coast of the Rif. In the reign of Yusuf II Al-Mustansir a great tower is erected to protect the royal palace in Seville.
- 1217: Abd al-Haqq I dies during victorious combat against the Almohads. His son Uthman ibn Abd al-Haqq (Uthman I) succeeds to the throne. Marinids take possession of the Rif and seem to want to remain there. The Almohades counterattack in vain.
- 1240: Uthman I is assassinated by one of his Christian slaves. His brother Muhammad ibn Abd Al-Haqq (Muhammad I) succeeds him.
- 1244: Muhammad I is killed by an officer of his own Christian mercenary militia. Abu Yahya ibn Abd al-Haqq, the third son of Abd Al-Haqq, succeeds him.
- 1249: Severe repression of anti-Marinid forces in Fez.
- 1258: Abu Yahya ibn Abd al-Haqq dies of disease. His uncle, Abu Yusuf Yaqub ibn Abd Al-Haqq, fourth son of Abd Al-Haqq, succeeds to the throne.
- 1260: The Castilians raid Salé.
- 1269: Seizure of Marrakesh and the end of Almohad domination of the western Maghreb.
- 1274: The Marinids seize Sijilmassa.
- 1276: Founding of Fes Jdid ("New Fez"), a new city near Fez, which comes to be considered a new district of Fez, in contrast to Fes el Bali ("Old Fez").
- 1286: Abu Yusuf Yaqub ibn Abd Al-Haqq dies of disease in Algeciras after a fourth expedition to the Iberian Peninsula. His son Abu Yaqub Yusuf an-Nasr replaces him.
- 1286: Abu Yaqub Yusuf an-Nasr combats revolts in and around the Draa River and the province of Marrakesh.
- 1288: Abu Yaqub Yusuf an-Nasr receives in Fez the envoys of the king of Granada, to whom the town of Cádiz is returned.
- 1291: Construction of the mosque of Taza, the earliest preserved Marinid building.
- 1296: Construction of Sidi Boumediene mosque, or Sidi Belhasan, in Tlemcen.
- 1299: Beginning of Tlemcen's siege by the Marinids, which will last nine years.
- 1306: Conquest and destruction of Taroudannt.
- 1307: Abu Yaqub Yusuf an-Nasr is assassinated by a eunuch in connection with some obscure matter related to the harem. His son Abu Thabit Amir succeeds to the throne.
- 1308: Abu Thabit dies of disease after only one year in power in Tétouan, a city which he has just founded. His brother, Abu al-Rabi Sulayman succeeds him.
- 1309: Abu al-Rabi Sulayman enters Ceuta.
- 1310: Abu al-Rabi dies of disease after having repressed a revolt of army officials in Taza. Among them is Gonzalve, chief of the Christian militia. His brother Abu Said Uthman succeeds him to the throne.
- 1323: Construction of the Attarin's madrasa in Fez.
- 1325: Ibn Battuta begins his 29-year journey across Africa and Eurasia.
- 1329: The Marinids defeat the Castilians in Algeciras, establishing a foothold in the south of the Iberian peninsula with the hope of reversing the Reconquista.
- 1331: Abu Said Uthman dies. His son Abu al-Hasan ibn Uthman succeeds him.
- 1337: First occupation of Tlemcen.
- 1340: A combined Portuguese–Castilian army defeats the Marinids in the Battle of Rio Salado, close to Tarifa, the southernmost town of the Iberian peninsula. The Marinids return to Africa.
- 1344: The Castilians take over Algeciras. The Marinids are definitively ejected from Iberia.
- 1347: Abu al-Hasan ibn Uthman destroys the Hafsid dynasty of Tunis and restores his authority over all the Maghreb.
- 1348: Abu al-Hasan dies, his son Abu Inan Faris succeeds him as Marinid ruler.
- 1348: The Black Death and the rebellions of Tlemcen and Tunis mark the beginning of the decline of the Marinids, who are unable to drive back the Portuguese and the Castilians.
- 1350: Construction of Bou Inania madrasa in Meknes.
- 1351: Second seizure of Tlemcen.
- 1357: Defeat of Abu Inan Faris in front of Tlemcen. Construction of another Bou Inania Madrasa in Fez.
- 1358 Abu Inan is assassinated by his vizir. A time of confusion starts. Each vizir tries to install weak candidates on the throne.
- 1358: Abu Zian as-Said Muhammad ibn Faris is named sultan by the vizirs, just after the assassination of Abu Inan. His reign lasts only a few months. Abu Yahya abu Bakr ibn Faris comes to power, but also reigns only a few months.
- 1359: Abu Salim Ibrahim is nominated sultan by the vizirs. He is one of the sons of Abu al-Hasan ibn Uthman and is supported by the king of Castille, Pedro.
- 1359: Resurgence of the Zianids of Tlemcen.
- 1361: Abu Umar Tachfin is named the successor to Abu Salim Ibrahim by the vizirs, with the support of the Christian militia. He reigns only a few months.
- 1361: The period called the "reign of the vizirs" ends.
- 1362: Muhammad ibn Yaqub assumes power. He is a young son of Abu al-Hasan ibn Uthman, who had taken refuge in Castile.
- 1366: Muhammad ibn Yaqub is assassinated by his vizir. He is replaced by Abu Faris Abd al-Aziz ibn Ali, one of the sons of Abu al-Hasan ibn Uthman who until this time had been held locked up in the palace of Fez.
- 1370: Third seizure of Tlemcen.
- 1372: Abu Faris Abd al-Aziz ibn Ali dies of disease leaving the throne to his very young son Muhammad as-Said, beginning a new period of instability. The vizirs try on several occasions to install a puppet sovereign.
- 1373: Muhammad as-Said is presented as the heir to his father, Abu Faris Abd al-Aziz ibn Ali, but being only five years old cannot reign, and dies in the same year.
- 1374: Abu al-Abbas Ahmad, supported by the Nasrid princes of Granada, takes power.
- 1374: Partition of the empire into two kingdoms: the Kingdom of Fez and the Kingdom of Marrakesh.
- 1384: Abu al-Abbas is temporarily removed by the Nasrids. The Nasrids replace him with Abu Faris Musa ibn Faris, a disabled son of Abu Inan Faris. This ensures a kind of interim during the reign of Abu al-Abbas Ahmad from 1384 to 1386.
- 1384: Abu Zayd Abd ar-Rahman reigns over the Kingdom of Marrakesh from 1384 to 1387 while the Marinid throne is still based in Fez.
- 1386: Al-Wathiq ensures the second part of the interim in the reign of Abu al-Abbas from 1386 to 1387.
- 1387: Abu Al-Abbas begins to give vizirs more power. Morocco knows six years of peace again, although Abu Al-Abbas benefits from this period to reconquer Tlemcen and Algiers.
- 1393: Abu Al-Abbas dies. Abu Faris Abd al-Aziz ibn Ahmad is designated as the new sultan. The troubles which follow the sudden death of Abu Al-Abbas in Taza make it possible for the Christian sovereigns to carry the war into Morocco.
- 1396: Abu Amir Abdallah succeeds to the throne.
- 1398: Abu Amir dies. His brother, Abu Said Uthman ibn Ahmad, takes power.
- 1399: Benefitting from the anarchy within the Marinid kingdom, king Henry III of Castile arrives in Morocco, seizes Tetouan, massacres half of the population and reduces the rest to slavery.
- 1415: King John I of Portugal seizes Ceuta. This conquest marks the beginning of overseas European expansion.
- 1418: Abu Said Uthman besieges Ceuta but is defeated.
- 1420: Abu Said Uthman dies. He is replaced by his son, Abu Muhammad Abd al-Haqq, who is only one year old.
- 1437: Failure of a Portuguese expedition to Tangier. Many prisoners are taken and the infant Fernando, the Saint Prince is kept as a hostage. A treaty is made with the Portuguese enabling them to embark if they return Ceuta. Fernando is kept as a hostage to guarantee the execution of this pact. Influenced by Pope Eugene IV, Edward of Portugal sacrifices his brother for national trade interests.
- 1458: King Afonso V of Portugal prepares an army for a crusade against the Ottomans in response to the call of Pope Pius II, but he instead uses the army to attack a small port located between Tangier and Ceuta.
- 1459: Abu Muhammad Abd Al-Haqq revolts against his own Wattasid vizirs. Only two brothers survive, who will become the first Wattasid sultans in 1472.
- 1462: Ferdinand IV of Castile takes over Gibraltar.
- 1465: Abu Muhammad Abd Al-Haqq appoints a Jewish vizir, Aaron ben Batash, provoking a popular revolt. The sultan dies in the revolt when his throat is cut. The Portuguese king Afonso V finally manages to take Tangier, benefitting from the troubles in Fez.
- 1472: Abu Abd Allah al-Sheikh Muhammad ibn Yahya, one of the two Wattasid vizirs surviving the 1459 massacre, installs himself in Fez, where he founds the Wattasid dynasty.

== Government ==
In many respects, the Marinids reproduced or continued the social and political structures that existed under the Almohads, ruling a primarily tribal state that relied on the loyalty of their own tribe and allies to maintain order and that imposed very little official civil administrative structures in the provinces beyond the capital. They also maintained the Berber traditions of democratic or consultative government, particularly through the existence of a council of Marinid tribal chiefs whom the sultan consulted when necessary, primarily on military matters. To maintain their control over the provinces beyond the capital of Fez, the Marinids mostly relied on appointing their family members to governorships or on securing local alliances through marriage. These local governors were in charge of both the administration and the military. After Abu Yusuf Ya'qub captured Marrakesh in 1269, for example, he appointed his ally Muhammad ibn 'Ali, to whom he was related by marriage, as his khalifa (deputy or governor) in Marrakesh, a position that would continue to exist for a long time. In some areas, like the mountainous Atlas and Rif regions, this resulted in indirect rule and a very limited presence of the central government.

The Marinid sultan was the head of the state and wielded the title of amīr al-muslimīn ("Commander of the Muslims"). In later periods the Marinid sultans sometimes also granted themselves the title of amīr al-mu'minīn ("Commander of the Faithful"). The involvement of the sultan in state affairs varied depending on the personality of each; some, like Abu al-Hassan, were directly involved in the bureaucracy, while others less so. Under the sultan, the heir-apparent usually held a large amount of power and often served as the head of the army on behalf of the sultan. Aside from these dynastic positions, the vizier was the official with the most executive power and oversaw most of the day-to-day operations of government. Several families of viziers became particularly powerful during the Marinid period and competed with each other for influence, with the Wattasids being the most significant example in their later history. After the vizier, the most important officials were the public treasurer, in charge of taxes and expenditures, who reported to either the vizier or the sultan. Other important officials included the sultan's chamberlain, the secretaries of his chancery, and the sahib al-shurta or "chief of police", who also oversaw judiciary matters. On some occasions the chamberlain was more important and the vizier reported to him instead.

=== Emblem ===
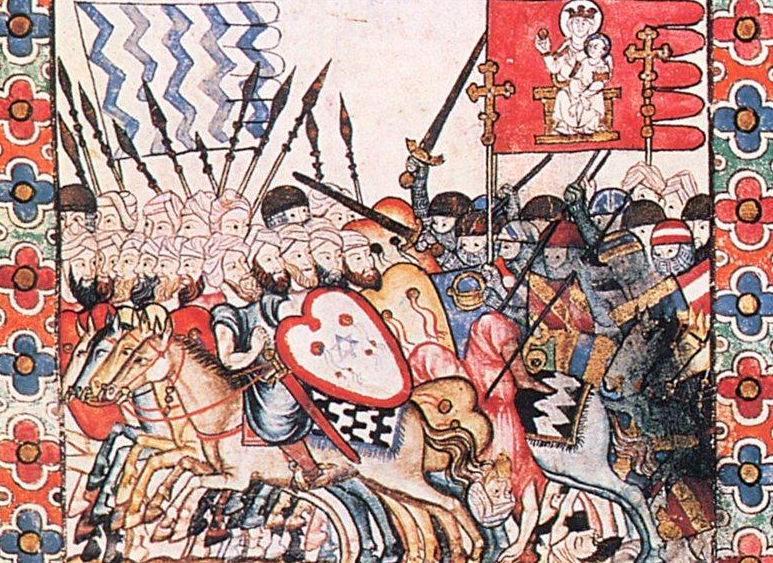
Marinid soldiers in the Cantigas de Santa Maria, depicted on the left under banners with white and blue zigzag pattern

Spanish Historian and Arabist Ambrosio Huici Miranda suggested that the Marinids used white banners, much like their Almohad predecessors, following a long Islamic tradition of using white as a dynastic color. Whether these white banners contained any specific motifs or inscriptions is not certain. Historian Michel Abitbol writes:

When the morning light shines, the Sultan mounts his horse and the white standard which is the flag of the dynasty, called al-Mansur (the Victorious) is carried next to him. Immediately before him march the armed men on foot; the horses held in hand, covered with caparisons of patterned cloth, that is to say, saddle blankets.

Historian Amira Bennison indicates that the Sultans's banner was white according to Marinid sources, she also states: "The naming of the Marinid palatine city, Madīnat al-Bayḍā', the White City, reflects their use of white as a dynastic colour." Egyptian historiographer Al-Qalqashandi (d. 1418) recalled a white flag made of silk with verses from the Qur’an written in gold at the top of the circle as the sultanate’s emblem among the kings of the Banu Abd al-Haqq of the Banu Marin in Morocco, calling it the Victorious Flag. Maghrebi historian Ibn Khaldun talked about the flags he saw during the time of Sultan Abu al-Hasan, indicating that they used to give governors, workers, and commanders permission to take one small flag made of white linen. Contemporary historian Charles-André Julien references the small white flag as a miniature version of the royal standard that was given to the main commander on the battlefield as a mark of authority to lead the troops. The flag was raised in conquered fortresses.

The Book of Knowledge of All Kingdoms, written by a Franciscan friar in the 14th century, describes the flag of Fez, the Marinid capital, as being plain white.

== Military ==
The Marinid army was largely composed of tribes loyal to the Marinids or associated with the ruling dynasty. However, the number of men these tribes could field had its limits, which required the sultans to recruit from other tribes and from mercenaries. Additional troops were drawn from other Zenata tribes of the central Maghreb and from the Arab tribes such as the Banu Hilal and Banu Ma'qil, who had moved further west into the Maghreb during the Almohad period. The Marinids also continued to hire Christian mercenaries from Europe, as their Almohad predecessors had done, who consisted mainly of cavalry and served as the sultan's bodyguard. This heterogeneity of the army is one of the reasons that direct central government control was not possible across the entire Marinid realm. The army was sufficiently large, however, to allow the Marinid sultans to send military expeditions to the Iberian Peninsula in the 13th and 14th centuries.

More details are known in particular about the army during the reign of Abu al-Hasan, which is described by some historical chroniclers such as Ibn Marzuk and al-Umari. His main attack force was composed of Zanata horsemen, around 40,000 strong, along with Arab tribal horsemen, around 1500 mounted archers of "Turkish" origin, and around 1000 Andalusi foot archers. The regular standing army, which also formed the sultan's personal guard, consisted of between 2000 and 5000 Christian mercenaries from Aragon, Castile, and Portugal, as well as Black Africans and Kurds. These mercenaries were paid a salary from the treasury, while the chieftains of tribal levies were given iqta' lands as compensation.

The army's main weakness was its naval fleet, which could not keep up with the fleet of Aragon. The Marinids had shipyards and naval arsenals at Salé and Sebta (Ceuta), but on at least one occasion the Marinid sultan hired mercenary ships from Catalonia. Marinid military contingents, mostly Zenata horsemen (also known as jinetes in Spanish), were also hired by the states of the Iberian Peninsula. They served, for example, in the armies of the Kingdom of Aragon and the Nasrid Emirate of Granada on some occasions. In Nasrid Granada, Zenata soldiers were led by exiled members of the Marinid family up until the late 14th century.

== Society ==
=== Population ===
The population under Marinid rule was mostly Berber and Arab, though there were contrasts between the main cities and the countryside as well as between sedentary and nomadic populations. The cities were heavily Arabized and more uniformly Islamicized (aside from minority Jewish and Christian communities). Urban local politics was marked by affiliations with local aristocratic families. In the countryside, the population remained largely Berber and dominated by tribal politics. The nomadic population, however, became more arabised than the rural sedentary population. Nomadic Berber tribes were joined by nomadic Arab tribes such as the Banu Hilal, who had arrived in this far western region during the Almohad period.

Jewish communities were a significant minority in urban centers and played a role in most aspects of society. It was during the Marinid period that the Jewish quarter of Fez el-Jdid, the first mellah in Morocco, came into existence. Jews were sometimes appointed to administrative positions in the state, though at other times they were dismissed from these positions for ideological and political reasons. There were also some Christians in urban centers, although these were mainly merchants and mercenary soldiers from abroad, forming small minorities primarily in the coastal cities.

=== Religion ===
While the Marinids did not declare themselves champions of a reformist religious ideology, as their Almohad and Almoravid predecessors had, they attempted to promote themselves as guardians of proper Islamic government as a way to legitimize their rule. They also restored Maliki Sunni Islam as the official religion after the previous period of official Almohadism. They allied themselves politically with the Maliki ulama (scholars/jurists), who were especially influential in the cities, and with the shurafa or sharifs (families claiming descent from Muhammad), with whom they sometimes intermarried. After establishing themselves in Fez, the Marinids insisted on directly appointing the officials in charge of religious institutions and on managing the waqf (or habus) endowments that financed mosques and madrasas.

The influence of the Maliki ulama of Fez was concentrated in Fez itself and was more important to urban culture; the scholars of Fez had more contact with the ulama of other major cities in the Maghreb than they did with religious leaders in the nearby countryside. Sufism, maraboutism, and other more "heterodox" Islamic currents were more prominent in rural areas. Indigenous Berber religions and religious practices also continued to linger in these areas. Some Sufi brotherhoods, especially those led by sharifian families, posed a potential political challenge to Marinid rule and were involved in occasional rebellions, but in general the Marinids attempted to incorporate them into their sphere of influence. They also used their patronage of Maliki institutions as a counterbalance to Sufism. Sufism was also practiced in the cities, often in a more scholarly form and with the involvement of the sultan, state officials, and various scholars.

=== Language ===
As the ruling family and its supporting tribes were Zenata Berbers, Berber (Tamazight) was generally the language spoken at the Marinid court in Fez. The Marinids also continued the Almohad practice of appointing religious officials who could preach in Tamazight. Tamazight languages and dialects also continued to be widely spoken in rural areas. However, Arabic was the language of law, government, and most literature, and assimilation of the region's population to Arabic language and culture also advanced significantly during this period.

== Culture ==
=== Intellectual life and education ===
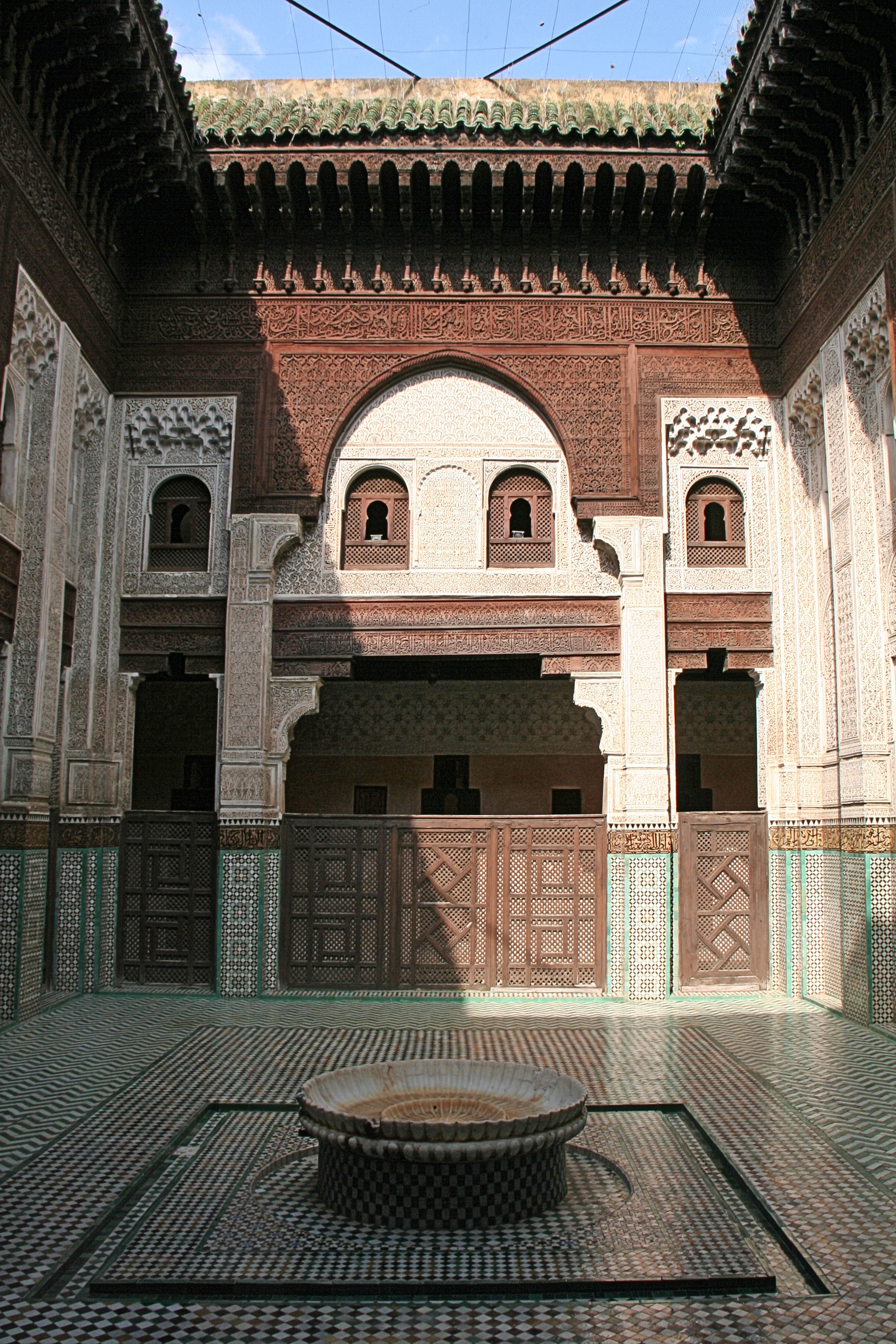
The Bou Inania Madrasa in Meknes, Morocco

The Marinids were eager patrons of Islamic scholarship and intellectual culture. It was in this period that the Qarawiyyin, the main center of learning in Fes, reached its apogee in terms of prestige, patronage, and intellectual scope. Additionally, the Marinids were prolific builders of madrasas, a type of institution which originated in northeastern Iran by the early 11th century and was progressively adopted further west. These establishments served to train Islamic scholars, particularly in Islamic law and jurisprudence (fiqh). The madrasa in the Sunni world was generally antithetical to more heterodox religious doctrines, including the doctrine espoused by the preceding Almohads. As such, it only came to flourish in Morocco under the Marinids that followed them. To the Marinids, madrasas played a part in bolstering the political legitimacy of their dynasty. They used this patronage to encourage the loyalty of Fes's influential but fiercely independent religious elites and also to portray themselves to the general population as protectors and promoters of orthodox Sunni Islam. The madrasas also served to train the scholars and elites who operated their state's bureaucracy.

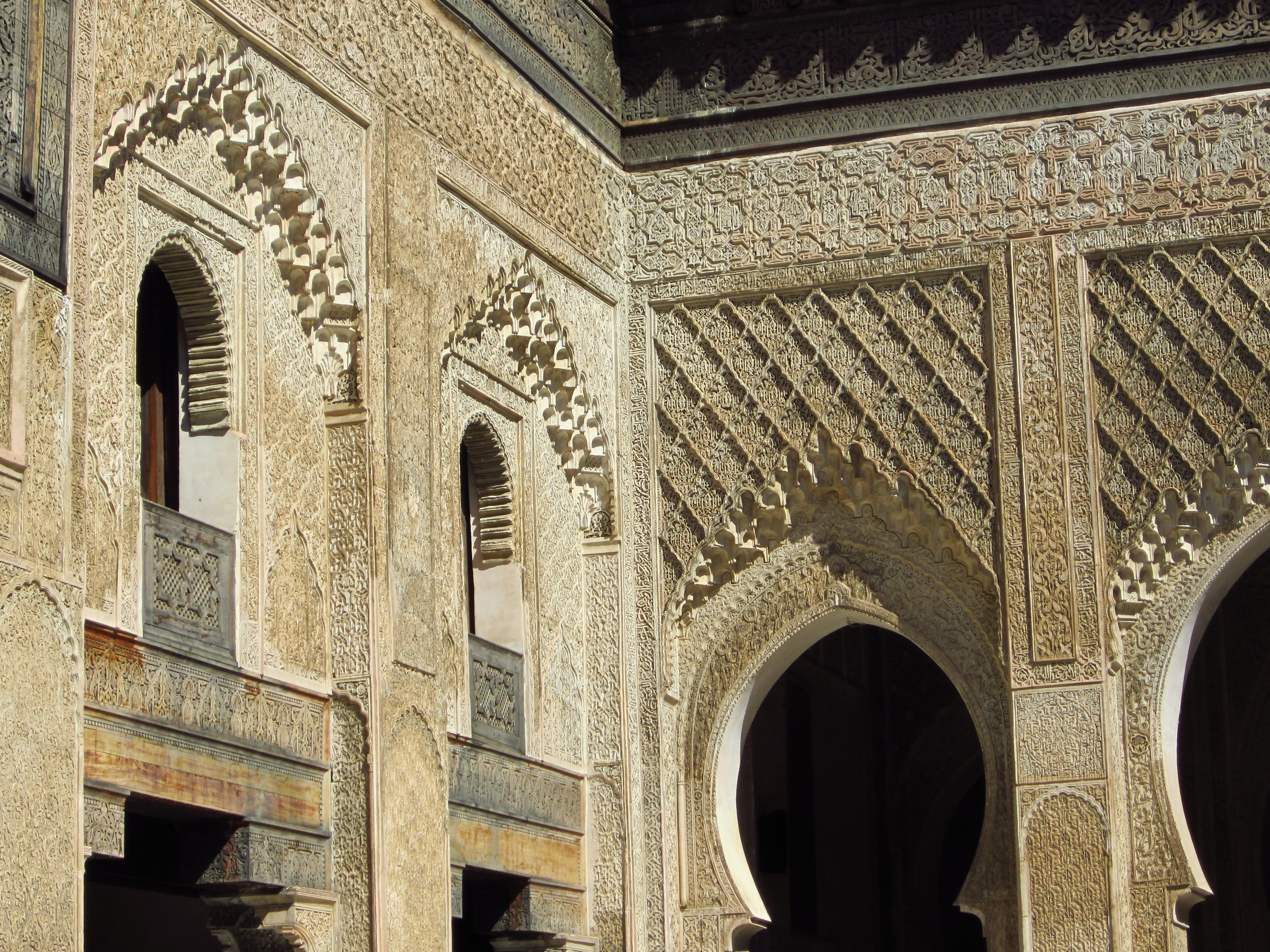
Sculpted decoration, including muqarnas, around the courtyard of the Bou Inania Madrasa in Fes

The majority of documented madrasa constructions took place in the first half of the 14th century, especially under the reign of Sultan Abu al-Hasan (ruled 1331–1348). Many of these madrasas were built near the major mosques which had already acted as older centers of learning, such as the Qarawiyyin, the Mosque of the Andalusians, and the Grand Mosque of Meknes. One of their most important functions seems to have been to provide housing for students from other towns and cities – many of them poor – who needed a place to stay while studying at these major centers of learning. In Fes, the first madrasa was the Saffarin Madrasa built in 1271, followed by the Sahrij Madrasa founded in 1321 (and the Sba'iyyin Madrasa next to it two years later), the al-Attarine in 1323, and the Mesbahiya Madrasa in 1346. Another madrasa, built in 1320 near the Grand Mosque of Fes el-Jdid, was less successful in contributing to the city's scholarly life. These madrasas taught their own courses and sometimes became well-known institutions in their own right, but they usually had much narrower curriculums or specializations than the Qarawiyyin. The last and largest Marinid madrasa in Fes, the Bou Inania, was a slightly more distinctive institution and was the only madrasa to also have the status of a Friday mosque. Surviving Marinid madrasas built in other cities include the Madrasa of Abu al-Hasan in Salé and the Bou Inana Madrasa of Meknes. Many more were built in other cities but have not been preserved, or only partially preserved, including in: Taza, al-Jadida, Tangier, Ceuta, Anfa, Azemmour, Safi, Aghmat, Ksar el-Kebir, Sijilmasa, Tlemcen, Marrakesh (the Ben Youssef Madrasa which was rebuilt in the 16th century), and Chellah (near Rabat).

Part of Al-Manhaj al-Faaiq wa al-Manhal al-Raaiq fi Ahkam al-Wathaaiq by al-Wansharisi, Mufti of Fes.

Literary production under the Marinids was relatively prolific and diverse. In addition to religious texts such as treaties of fiqh (jurisprudence), there was also poetry and scientific texts. Geographies and, most of all, histories were produced, partly because the dynasty itself was eager to use these to legitimize its rule. The oldest surviving historical chronicle from the Marinid period is considered to be al-Dhakhîrah as-Sanîyya probably composed by Ibn Abi Zar (first published by Professor Mohamed Bencheneb, Algiers, 1920). Ibn Khaldun was the most famous manifestation of this intellectual life which was also shared with the Emirate of Granada in Al-Andalus, where many of the intellectuals of this period also spent time. Ibn al-Khatib, the Andalusi poet and writer from Granada, also spent time in Fes and North Africa when his Nasrid master Muhammad V was there in exile between 1358 and 1362. The historian Ibn Idhari was another example, while the famous traveler Ibn Battuta also passed through Morocco and other regions in Africa and Asia in the 14th century and described them in his writings. Not only grand regional histories but also local histories were composed by some authors for cities and towns.

=== Art ===
Marinid art continued many of the artistic traditions previously established in the region under the Almoravids and Almohads.

==== Metalwork ====
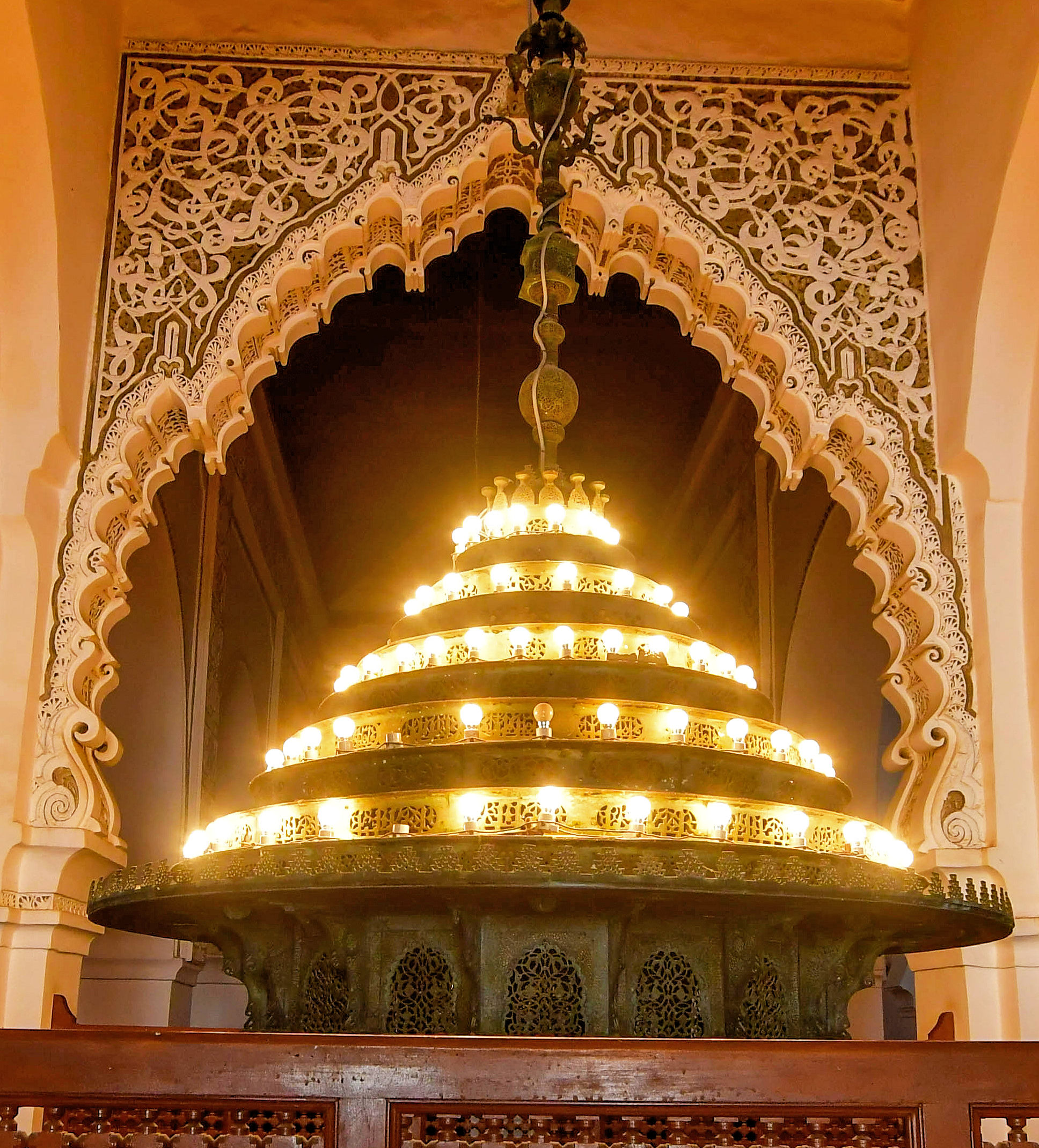
The enormous Marinid chandelier in the Great Mosque of Taza

Many Marinid religious buildings were furnished with the same kind of bronze chandeliers that the Almohads made for mosques. The Marinid chandelier in the Great Mosque of Taza, with a diameter of 2.5 metres and weighing 3 tons, is the largest surviving example of its kind in North Africa. It dates to 1294 and was commissioned by Sultan Abu Yaqub Yusuf. It is closely modeled on another large chandelier in the Qarawiyyin Mosque made by the Almohads. It is composed of nine circular tiers arranged in an overall conical shape that could hold 514 glass oil lamps. Its decoration included mainly arabesque forms like floral patterns as well as a poetic inscription in cursive Arabic.

A number of other ornate metal chandeliers hanging in the Qarawiyyin mosque's prayer hall also date from the Marinid era. Three of them were made from church bells which Marinid craftsmen used as a base onto which they grafted ornate copper fittings. The largest of them, installed in the mosque in 1337, was a bell brought back from Gibraltar by the son of Sultan Abu al-Hasan, Abu Malik, after its reconquest from Christian forces in 1333.

==== Textiles and banners ====
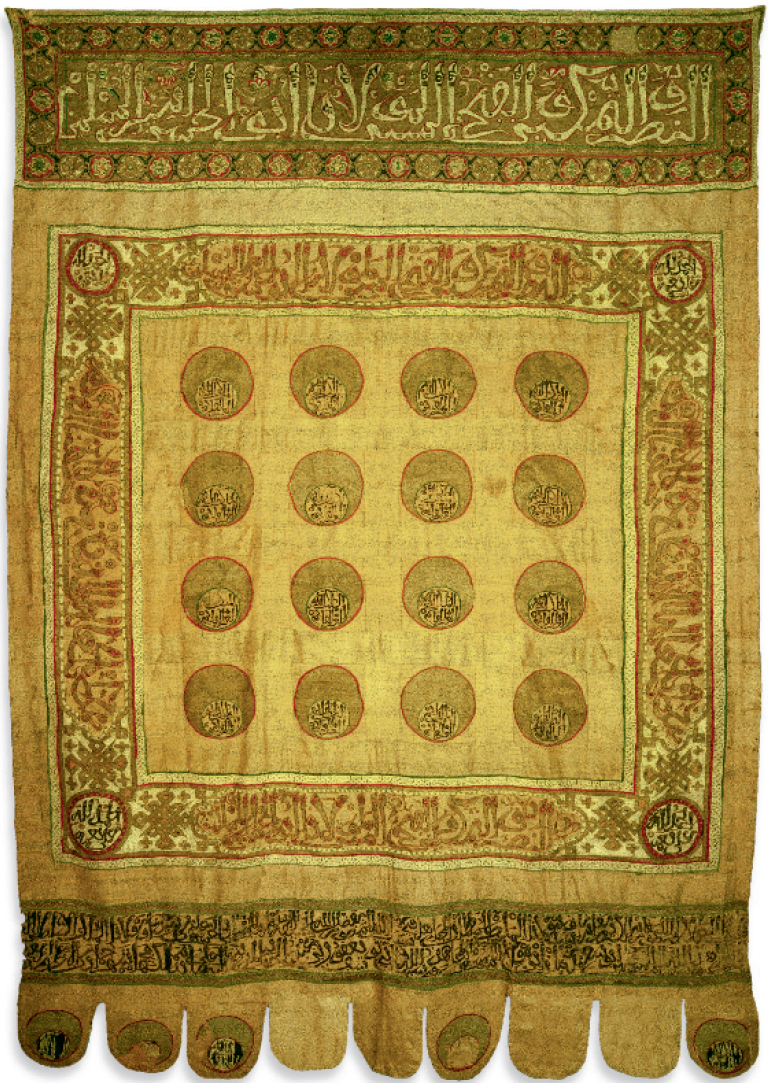
The banner of Sultan Abu al-Hasan, dated to 1339–1340, now housed at the Cathedral of Toledo

Not many Marinid textiles have survived, but it is assumed that luxurious silks continued to be made as in previous periods. The only reliably-dated Marinid textiles extant today are three impressive banners which were captured from Sultan Abu al-Hasan's army in the Battle of Rio Salado in 1340 by Alfonso XI. Today they are housed at the Cathedral of Toledo. Ibn Khaldun wrote that Abu al-Hasan possessed hundreds of silk and gold banners which were displayed in palaces or on ceremonial occasions, while both the Marinid and Nasrid armies carried many colourful banners with them into battle. They thus had great symbolic value and were deployed on many occasions.

The oldest of the three banners is dated, according to its inscription, to May or June 1312 (Muharram 712 AH). It was made in the "kasbah" (royal citadel) of Fes for Sultan Abu Sa'id Uthman (father of Abu al-Hasan). The banner measures 280 by 220 cm and is made of predominantly green silk taffeta, along with decorative motifs woven in blue, white, red, and gold thread. Its visual layout shares other general similarities with the so-called Banner of Las Navas de Tolosa from the earlier Almohad period (13th century). The central part of the banner is filled with a grid of sixteen green circles containing short religious statements in small cursive inscriptions. This area is contained in turn within a large rectangular frame. The band of the frame is filled with monumental and ornamental inscriptions in white Kufic letters whose style is similar to the Kufic inscriptions carved into the walls of the Marinid madrasas of Fes, which in turn are derived from earlier Kufic inscriptions found in Almohad architecture. These inscriptions feature a selection of Qur'anic verses very similar to those found in the same positions in the Banner of Las Navas de Tolosa (mainly Qur'an 61:10-11). At the four corners of the rectangular band are roundels containing golden cursive letters against a deep blue background, whose inscriptions attribute victory and salvation to God. The whole rectangular band is in turn lined on both its inner and outer edges by smaller inscription bands of Qur'anic verses. Lastly, the bottom edge of the banner is filled with two lines of red cursive script detailing the titles and lineage of Abu Sa'id Uthman and the date of the banner's fabrication.

The second banner was made for Abu al-Hasan and is dated, according to its inscriptions, to Jumada II 740 AH (corresponding to either December 1339 or January 1340). It measures 347 by 267 centimeters. It is made with similar weaving techniques as its older counterpart and uses the same overall visual arrangement, although this time the predominant colour is yellow, with details woven in blue, red, gold thread, or different shades of yellow. It features a grand Arabic inscription in cursive letters along its top edge which calls for the victory of its owner, Abu al-Hasan. The central part of the banner once again has sixteen circles, arranged in a grid formation, each containing a small Arabic cursive inscription that repeats either the words "Eternal power and infinite glory" or "Perpetual joy and infinite glory". These circles are in turn contained within a large rectangular frame whose band is occupied by four more cursive inscriptions, of moderate size, which again call for Abu al-Hasan's victory while attributing all victory to God. Four more small inscriptions are contained within circles at the four corners of this frame. Finally, the bottom edge of the banner is occupied by a longer inscription, in small cursive letters again, which gives the full titles and lineage of Abu al-Hasan.

A third banner, undated and less well-preserved, is also believed to date from Abu al-Hasan's time. It is curious for the fact that its inscriptions are painted onto the fabric instead of woven into it, while the orientation of its inscriptions is inversed or "mirrored". Some scholars have suggested that it may have been a cheaper reproduction of Abu al-Hasan's banner intended for the use by soldiers or that it was intended as a template drawn by the calligrapher from which artisans could weave the real banner (and as weaving was done from the back, the letters would have to appear reversed from the weaver's perspective during production).

==== Manuscripts ====
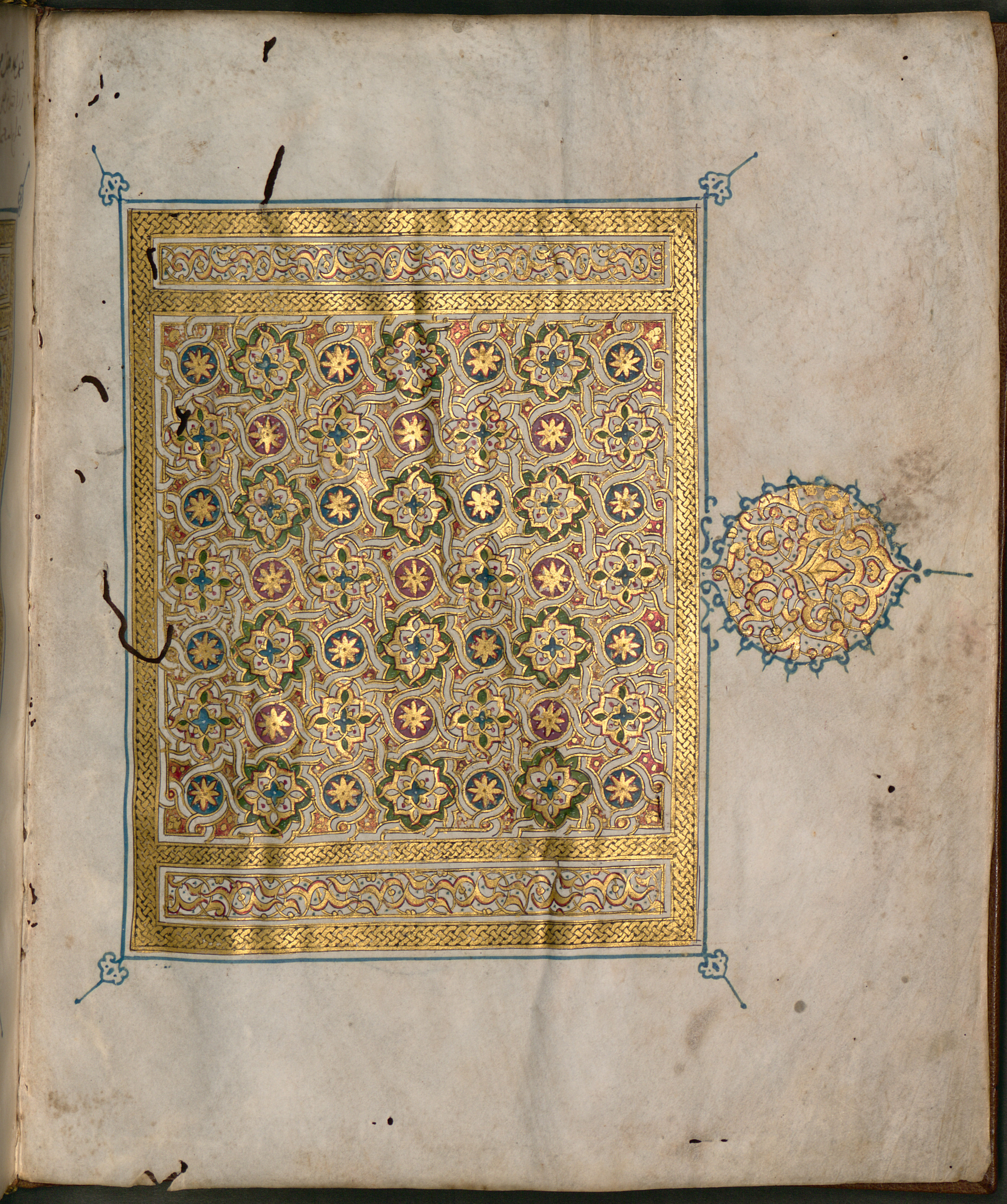
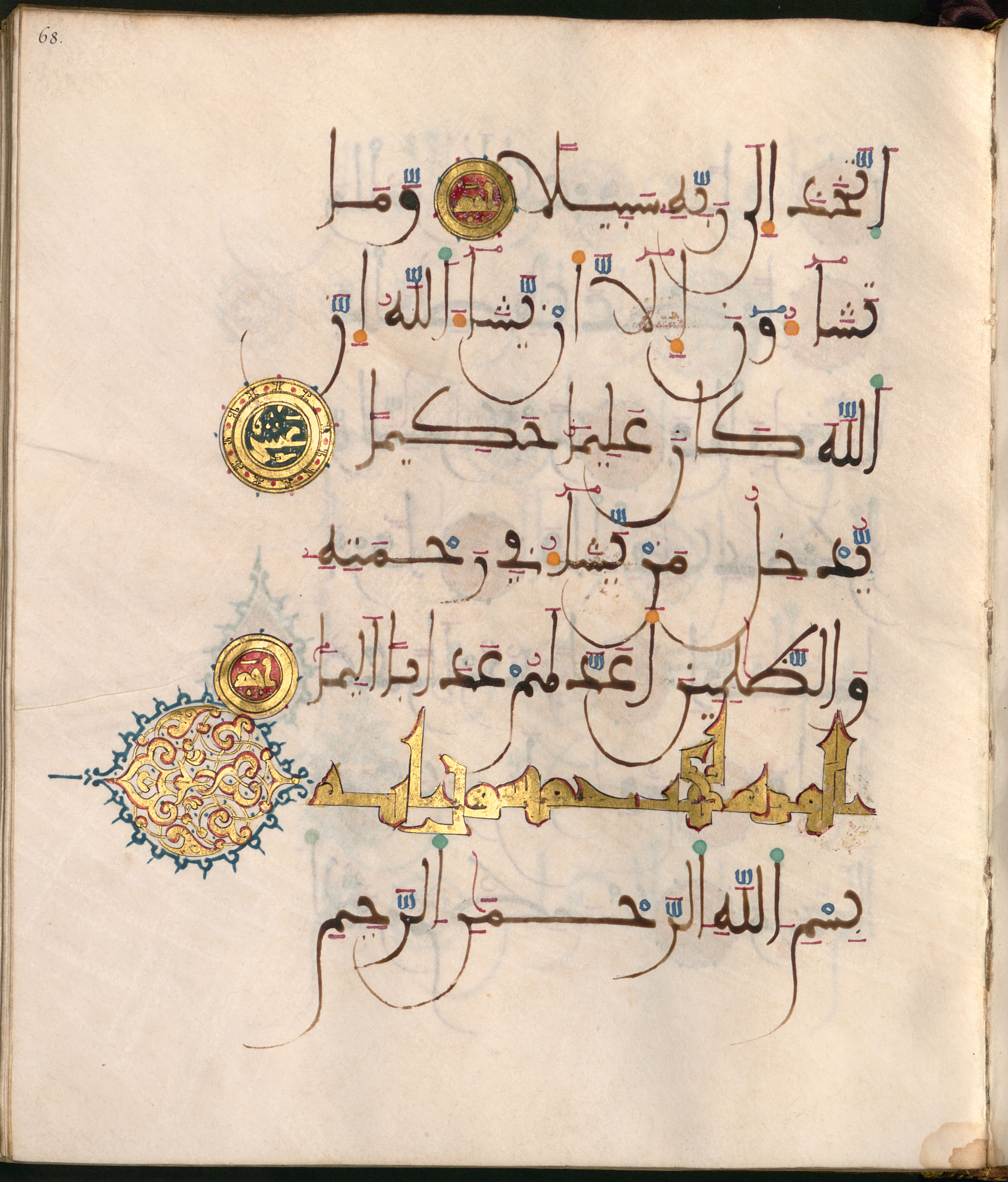
Pages from a Qur'an commissioned by Abu Yaqub Yusuf and dated to 1306 (now kept at the Bavarian State Library, Munich.)

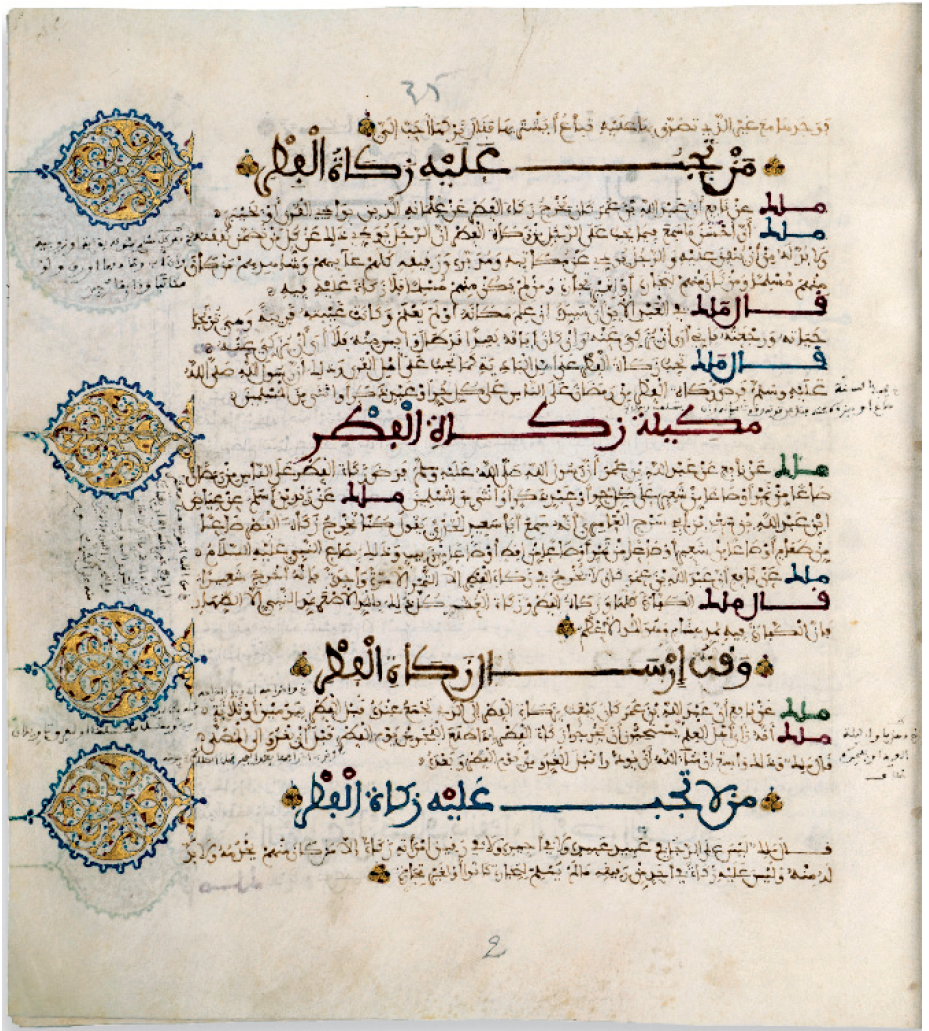
Page from a manuscript of al-Muwatta' by Malik ibn Anas, copied in Salé in 1326

A number of manuscripts from the Marinid period have been preserved to the present-day. One outstanding example is a Qur'an manuscript commissioned by Sultan Abu Yaqub Yusuf and dated to 1306. It features an elaborately illuminated frontispiece and is written in a broad Maghrebi script using brown ink, with headings written in golden Kufic letters and new verses marked by small labels inside gold circles. Like most other manuscripts in this time and region, it was written on parchment.

Many of the sultans were themselves accomplished calligraphers. This tradition of sovereigns practicing calligraphy and copying the Qur'an themselves was well-established in many Islamic elite circles by the 13th century, with the oldest surviving example in this region dating from the Almohad caliph al-Murtada (d. 1266). According to Ibn Marzuq and various other Marinid chroniclers, Sultan Abu al-Hasan was particularly prolific and skilled, and is recorded to have copied four Qur'ans. The first one appears to have been started following several years of military successes and was finished in 1339, at which point it was sent to Chellah (where he was later buried). The next copy was sent to the Mosque of the Prophet in Medina in 1339–40 via the intermediary of Sultan Qalawun in Egypt, and a third one a couple of years later went to the Masjid al-Haram in Mecca. The fourth copy, one of the finest preserved Marinid manuscripts, is a thirty-volume Qur'an which he donated to the Al-Aqsa Mosque in Jerusalem in 1344–45 and is now kept at the Islamic Museum of the Haram al-Sharif. While in Bijaya (Bougie) he began a fifth copy intended for Al-Khalil (Hebron), but he was unable to finish it following his military defeats in the east and subsequent dethronement. It was instead finished by his son Abu Faris Abd al-Aziz and eventually brought to Tunis by Ibn Marzuq. Abu al-Hasan's son and immediate successor, Abu Inan, for his part, is known to have copied a collection of hadiths with letters written in a mix of blue and brown ink, with gold flourishes.

Aside from Qur'an manuscripts, many other religious and legal texts were copied by calligraphers of this time, especially works related to the Maliki school such as the Muwatta' by Malik ibn Anas. They range from volumes written in plain Maghrebi script to richly-illuminated manuscripts produced by the Marinid royal libraries. Preserved in various historic Moroccan libraries today, these manuscripts also show that, in addition to the capital of Fes, important workshops for production were also located in Salé and Marrakesh.

==== Minbars ====
The minbars (pulpits) of the Marinid era were also following in the same tradition as earlier Almoravid and Almohad wooden minbars. The minbar of the Great Mosque of Taza dates to the mosque's expansion by Abu Yaqub Yusuf in the 1290s, much like the mosque's chandelier. Like other minbars, it takes the shape of a mobile staircase with an archway at the bottom of the stairs and a canopy at the top and it is composed of many pieces of wood assembled together. In spite of later restorations which modified its character, it still preserves much of its original Marinid woodwork. Its two flanks are covered with an example of the elaborate geometric decoration found in the artisan tradition dating back to the 12th-century Almoravid minbar of the Kutubiyya Mosque (in Marrakesh). This geometric motif is based on eight-pointed stars from which interlacing bands spread outward and repeat the motif across the whole surface. Contrary to the famous Almoravid minbar in Marrakesh, however, the empty spaces between the bands are not occupied by a mix of pieces with carved floral reliefs but are rather occupied entirely by pieces of marquetry mosaic decoration inlaid with ivory and precious woods.

The original minbar of the Bou Inania Madrasa, which is housed today at the Dar Batha museum, dates from 1350 to 1355 when the madrasa was being built. It is notable as one of the best Marinid examples of its kind. The Bou Inania minbar, made of wood – including ebony and other expensive woods – is decorated via a mix of marquetry and inlaid carved decoration. The main decorative pattern along its major surfaces on either side is centered around eight-pointed stars, from which bands decorated with ivory inlay then interweave and repeat the same pattern across the rest of the surface. The spaces between these bands form other geometric shapes which are filled with wood panels of intricately carved arabesques. This motif is similar to that found on the Kutubiyya minbar, and even more so to that of the slightly later Almohad minbar of the Kasbah Mosque in Marrakesh (commissioned between 1189 and 1195). The arch above the first step of the minbar contains an inscription, now partly disappeared, which refers to Abu Inan and his titles.

=== Architecture ===
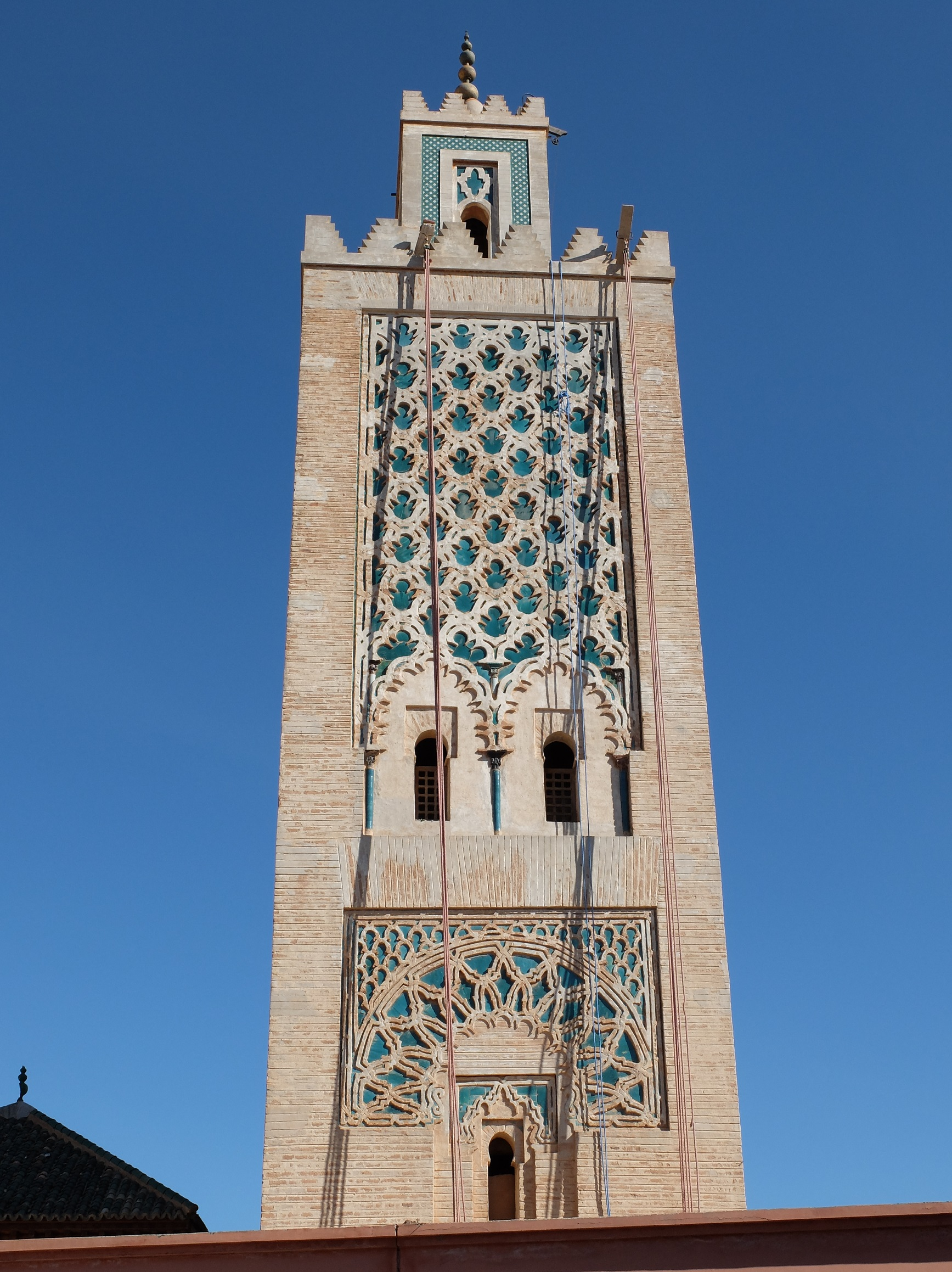
Minaret of the Marinid-era Ben Salah Mosque in Marrakesh

The Marinid dynasty was important in further refining the artistic legacy established under their Almoravid and Almohad predecessors. Particularly in Fes, their capital, they built monuments with increasingly intricate and extensive decoration, particularly in wood and stucco. They were also the first to deploy extensive use of zellij (mosaic tilework in complex geometric patterns), which became standard in Moroccan architecture afterwards. Their architectural style was very closely related to that found in the Emirate of Granada, in Spain, under the contemporary Nasrid dynasty. The decoration of the famous Alhambra is thus reminiscent of what was built in Fes at the same time. When Granada was conquered in 1492 by Catholic Spain and the last Muslim realm of al-Andalus came to an end, many of the remaining Spanish Muslims (and Jews) fled to Morocco and North Africa, further increasing the Andalusian cultural influence in these regions in subsequent generations.

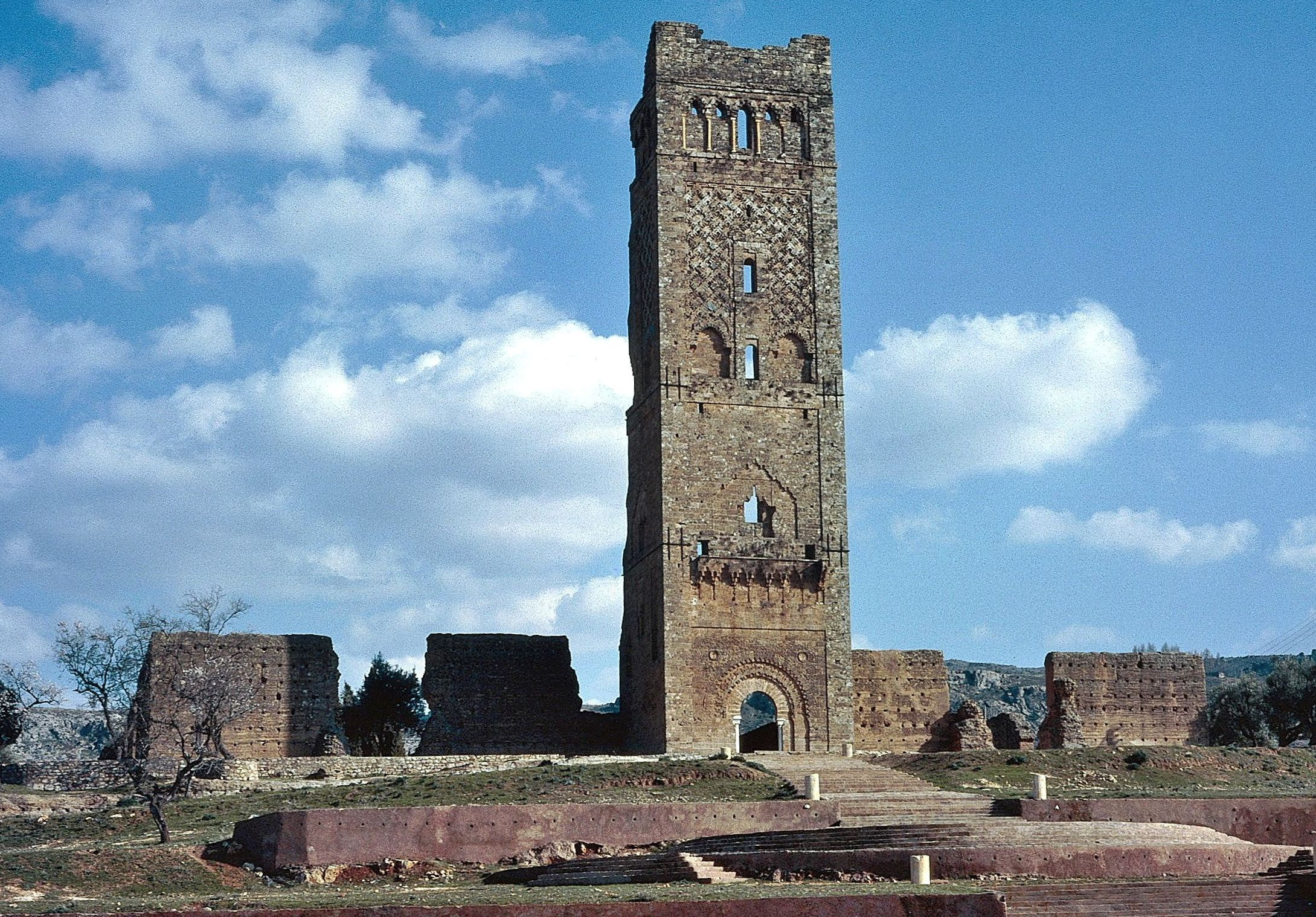
The ruins of the Mosque of Mansourah near Tlemcen

Notably, the Marinids were the first to build madrasas in the region. The madrasas of Fes, such as the Bou Inania, al-Attarine, and Sahrij madrasas, as well as the Marinid madrasa of Salé and the other Bou Inania in Meknes, are considered among the greatest architectural works in western Islamic architecture of this period. Notable examples of Marinid mosque architecture are the Grand Mosque of Fes el-Jdid (founded in 1276, one of the earliest Marinid mosques), the expansion of the Great Mosque of Taza in 1294, the Mosque of al-Mansourah near Tlemcen (1303), and the Mosque of Sidi Abu Madyan (1338–39). The Ben Salah Mosque in Marrakesh also dates from the Marinid period, one of the few monuments from this period in the city.

Of the Marinid royal palaces in Fes el-Jdid little has survived, with the current Royal Palace of Fes dating mainly from the later Alaouite period. Likewise, the former Marinid Royal Gardens to the north have disappeared and the complex around the Marinid Tombs on the hills overlooking Fes el-Bali are largely ruined. Some Marinid monumental gates, such as the gate of the Chellah necropolis near Rabat and the Bab el-Mrissa in Salé, are still standing today and demonstrate resemblances with earlier Almohad models.

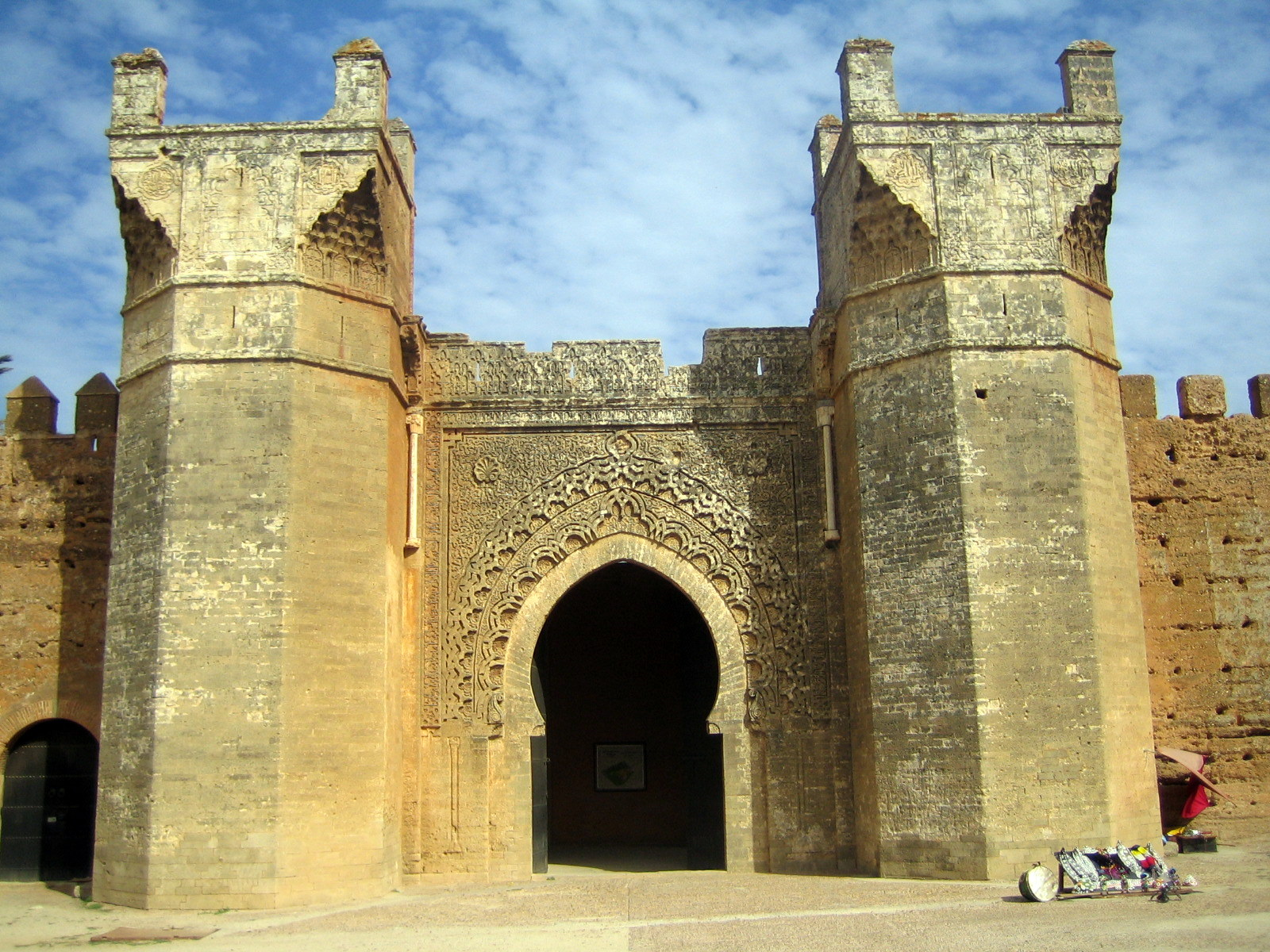
The main gate of Chellah, near Rabat, which became a Marinid necropolis

According to the Rawd al-Qirtas, the founder of the Marinid dynasty, Abu Muhammad Abd al-Haqq I (d. 1217), was buried at a site called Tāfirtāst or Tāfarṭast, a site near Meknes (close to where he fell in battle). Starting with Abu Yusuf Ya'qub (d. 1286), the Marinid sultans began to be buried at a new necropolis in Chellah (the site of the former Roman city called Sala Colonia). The necropolis was surrounded by a set of walls and an ornate monumental gate completed by Abu al-Hasan in 1339. Abu al-Hasan himself was then buried in a small mausoleum that was part of religious funerary complex that also included a mosque and madrasa, likely completed by his son and successor, Abu Inan. Abu Inan himself is believed to have been buried in Fes instead, in a qubba attached to the Great Mosque of Fes el-Jdid. After him, most sultans were buried at the site known as the Marinid Tombs to the north of Fes el-Bali.

== List of rulers ==
The following is the list of Marinid rulers till the end of the dynasty.

=== Emirs of Taza (1215–1244) ===
1. Abu Muhammad Abd al-Haqq I, 1215–1217
2. Abu Sa'id Uthman I, son of Abd al-Haqq I, 1217–1240
3. Abu Ma'ruf Muhammad I, son of Abd al-Haqq I, 1240–1244

=== Emirs of Fez (1244–1269) ===
4. Abu Yahya Abu Bakr I, son of Abd al-Haqq I, 1244–1258
5. Abu Yusuf Ya'qub, son of Abd al-Haqq I, 1258–1269

=== Sultans of Fez and Morocco (1269–1465) ===
6. Abu Yusuf Ya'qub, son of Abd al-Haqq I, 1269–1286
7. Abu Ya'qub Yusuf, son of Ya'qub, 1286–1307
8. Abu Thabit Amir, son of Yusuf, 1307–1308
9. Abu al-Rabi Sulayman, son of Yusuf, 1308–1310
10. Abu Sa'id Uthman II, son of Ya'qub, 1310–1331
11. Abu al-Hasan Ali, son of Uthman II, 1331–1351
12. Abu Inan Faris, son of Ali, 1348–1358
13. Abu Zayyan Muhammad II, son of Faris, 1358, 1361–1365
14. Abu Yahya Abu Bakr II, son of Faris, 1358–1359
15. Abu Salim Ibrahim, son of Ali, 1359–1361
16. Abu Amr Tashfin, son of Ali, 1361
17. Abu Faris Abd al-Aziz I, son of Ali, 1365–1372
18. Abu Zayyan Muhammad III, son of Abd al-Aziz I, 1372–1374
19. Abu 'l-Abbas Ahmad, son of Abd al-Aziz I, 1373–1384, 1387–1393
20. Abu Faris Musa, son of Faris, 1384–1386
21. Abu Zayyan Muhammad IV, son of Ahmad, 1386–1387
22. Abu Faris Abd al-Aziz II, son of Ahmad, 1393–1396
23. Abu Amir Abd Allah, son of Ahmad, 1396–1397
24. Abu Sa'id Uthman III, son of Ahmad, 1398–1420
25. Abu Muhammad Abd al-Haqq II, son of Uthman III, 1420–1465

== Family tree ==
Family tree of the Marinid dynasty

Abd al-Haqq I r. 1215–1217
Uthman I r. 1217–1240	Muhammad I r. 1240–1244	Abu Bakr I r. 1244–1258	Ya'qub r. 1258–1286
Yusuf r. 1286–1307	Uthman II r. 1310–1331
Amir r. 1307–1308	Sulayman r. 1308–1310	Ali r. 1331–1351
Faris r. 1348–1358	Ibrahim r. 1359–1361	Tashfin r. 1361	Abd al-Aziz I r. 1365–1372
Muhammad II r. 1358, 61–65	Abu Bakr II r. 1358–1359	Musa r. 1384–1386	Muhammad III r. 1372–1374	Ahmad r. 1373–1384, 87–93
Muhammad IV r. 1386–1387	Abd al-Aziz II r. 1393–1396	Abd Allah r. 1396–1397	Uthman III r. 1398–1420
Abd al-Haqq II r. 1420–1465

== See also ==
- Marinid Tombs in Fes
- List of Sunni Muslim dynasties

== Bibliography ==
- JULIEN, Charles-André, Histoire de l'Afrique du Nord, des origines à 1830, édition originale 1931, réédition Payot, Paris, 1994 (in French)
- Marinid Dynasty at Encyclopædia Britannica
