= Disputa de l'ase =

Disputa de l'ase contra frare Anselm Turmeda
- Cover to 1922 edition (Lluís Deztany)
- Author: Anselm Turmeda
- Language: Catalan
- Genre: Novel
- Publication place: Tunis

Disputa de l’ase (1417) is a Catalan medieval novel. It is about the discussion between a monk and a donkey about the human superiority over the other animals. The monk wins in the 19th argument, stating that human is superior, because God chose human body for their incarnation. The work was written by Anselm Turmeda, a Majorcan writer and former Catholic friar who lived in Tunis and converted to Islam. It is his longest work in Catalan, his mother tongue. It is of Arabic inspiration, even though it incorporates an important portion of original elements, such as the literary style and a strong feeling of anti-clericalism.

No manuscript of the original work has been preserved, except for a small part containing a prophecy pronounced by the donkey during the discussion with the monk. There is evidence that the novel was printed in Barcelona in its original Catalan version in 1509, but no copy of this edition has been preserved (probably due to the fact that, in 1583, the Spanish Inquisition included the work to its list of prohibited books). It is only thanks to the French version of the text, which was printed in Lyon at least three times during the 16th century, that the work is known today. Some decades later, at the beginning of the 17th century, the text was also translated into German and printed in Montbéliard. It was not until relatively recently (less than a century ago) that the work was rescued from oblivion mostly by Spanish and Catalan scholars. The book has now been re-translated into Catalan.

== Bibliography ==
- Aguiló, Estanislau K., Anselm Turmeda: apuntes bio-bibliográficos. Palma de Mallorca, Viuda e Hijos de Gelabert, 1885.
- de Riquer, Martí; Comas, Antoni; Molas, Joaquim. «Anselm Turmeda». Història de la literatura catalana, v. 2, p. 466-476. Barcelona, Ariel, S.A, 1984.
- Rubió i Balaguer, Jordi, «Un text català de La Disputa de l’Ase, de Fra Anselm Turmeda», Estudis Universitaris Catalans. Barcelona, 1913, p. 9-24.
