= Abu Yahya ibn Abd al-Haqq =

Moroccan Marinid ruler from 1244 to 1258

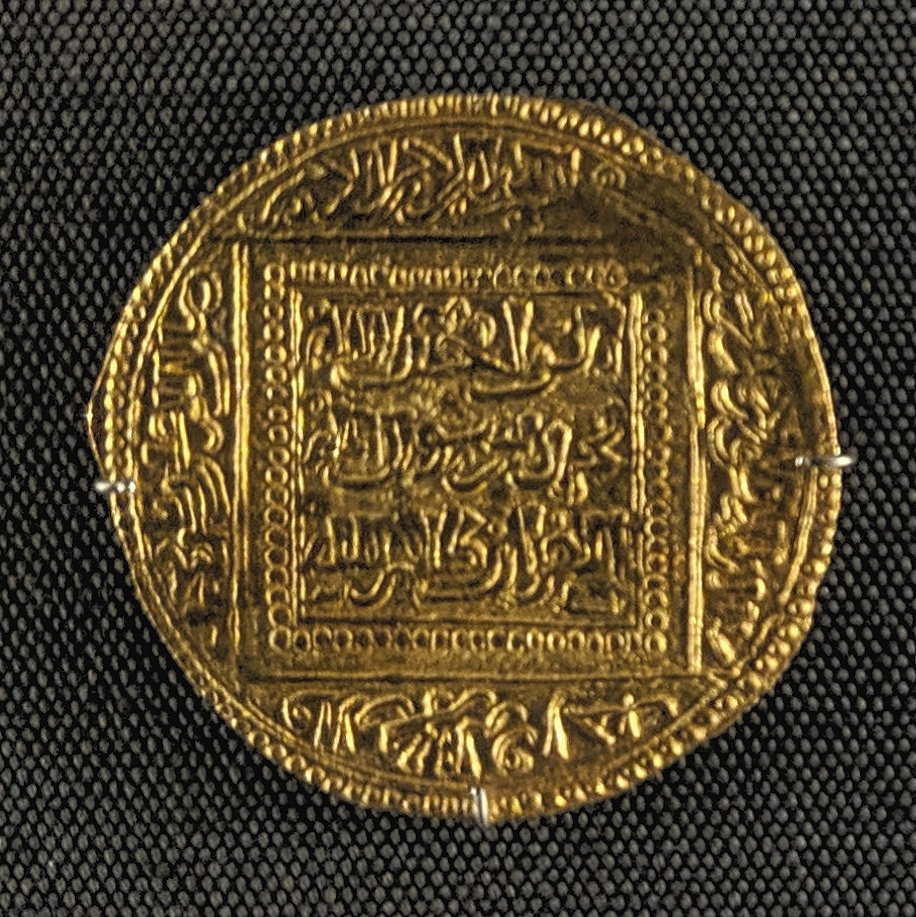
- Dinar minted under the reign of Abu Yahya ibn Abd al-Haqq.

Marinid Sultan
- Reign: 1244 – 1258
- Predecessor: Muhammad I
- Successor: Abu Yusuf Yaqub ibn Abd Al-Haqq
- Died: 1258
- Abu Yahya Abu Bakr ibn ‘Abd al-Haqq
- Dynasty: Marinid
- Father: Abd al-Haqq I
- Religion: Islam

Abu Yahya Abu Bakr ibn Abd al-Haqq (Arabic: أبو يحيى بن عبد الحق) (died 1258) was a Marinid ruler from 1244 to 1258.

== Life ==
Abu Yahya was the son of Abd al-Haqq I and the brother of both Uthman I and Muhammad I. When he ascended the throne in 1244, Abu Yahya shared control of Morocco with the various Marinid clans then grouped together in the east of Upper Moulouya. He captured the territory of Meknes which became the first Marinid capital, but the Almohad Abu al-Hasan as-Said led an offensive against him. Therefore Abu Yahya retreated to eastern Morocco. Abu al-Hasan as-Said then took the opportunity to attack Yaghmurasen Ibn Zyan, founder of the kingdom of Tlemcen, but in 1248 he was killed and Abu Yahya wiped out what remained of the Almohad army in Guercif. Abu Yahya was now in control of all of eastern Morocco. Abu Yahya captured Fez in 1248 and reached the ocean. The fight against the Almohads continued for many years. By the time Abu Yahya died of illness in 1258, the Almohads only controlled the High Atlas, the Sous, the region of Marrakesh and the area between this city and Oum Er-Rbia River.

Preceded by Muhammad I	Marinid Sultan; 1244–1258	Succeeded by Abu Yusuf Yaqub ibn Abd Al-Haqq
