= Abd al-Aziz II ibn Ahmad II =

Marinid Sultan 1393 to 1396

Abd al-Aziz II ibn Ahmad

Marinid Sultan
- Reign: 1393 – 1396
- Predecessor: Abul Abbas Ahmad Mustanzir
- Successor: Abdallah ibn Ahmad II
- Born: 1375
- Died: 1396 (aged 20–21)
- Dynasty: Marinid
- Religion: Islam

Abu Faris Abd al-Aziz II ibn Ahmad (Arabic: عبد العزيز الثاني المريني) was Marinid Sultan from 1393 to 1396.

== Life ==
Abdul Aziz II succeeded Abul Abbas Ahmad Mustanzir in 1393. During his rule the state was effectively ruled by the vizier. He was succeeded by his brother Abdallah ibn Ahmad II in 1396.
