= Abdallah ibn Ahmad II =

Marinid Sultan from 1396 to 1398

Abdallah ibn Ahmad

Marinid Sultan
- Reign: 1396 – 1398
- Predecessor: Abu Faris Abdul Aziz II
- Successor: Abu Said Uthman III
- Born: 1378
- Died: 1398 (aged 19–20)
- Dynasty: Marinid
- Religion: Islam

Abu Amir Abdallah ibn Ahmad (Arabic: أبو عامر عبد الله بن أحمد) was the Marinid Sultan from 1396 to 1398.

== Life ==
Abdallah succeeded his brother Abu Faris Abdul Aziz II in 1396. During his rule the state was effectively ruled by the vizier. He was succeeded by his brother Abu Said Uthman III in 1398.
