= Muhammad ibn Abd Al-Haqq =

Marinid ruler from 1240 to 1244

Marinid Sultan
- Reign: 1240 – 1244
- Predecessor: Uthman I
- Successor: Abu Yahya ibn Abd al-Haqq
- Born: 1202
- Died: 12 November 1244 (aged 41–42)
- Dynasty: Marinid
- Father: Abd al-Haqq I
- Religion: Islam

Muhammad ibn Abd Al-Haqq (Arabic: محمد بن عَبد الحَقّ; died 1244) was a Marinid ruler. He was the son of Abd al-Haqq I and the brother of Uthman I.

He continued to fight the Almohads especially around the city of Meknes.

Muhammad ibn Abd al-Haqq died during a battle against the Almohads on 12 November 1244 by the hand of European mercenary captain Juan Gaitan.

Preceded by Uthman I	Marinid Dynasty; 1240–1244	Succeeded by Abu Yahya ibn Abd al-Haqq
