= Muhammad ibn Ahmad al-Wathiq =

Marinid Sultan from 1386 to 1387

Marinid Sultan
- Reign: 1386 – 1387
- Predecessor: Musa ibn Faris al-Mutawakkil
- Successor: Abul Abbas Ahmad Mustanzir
- Born: unknown
- Died: 1387
- Dynasty: Marinid
- Religion: Islam

Muhammad ibn Ahmad al-Wathiq (Arabic: محمد الرابع المريني) (Muhammad ibn Ahmad Abu Zayyan) was Marinid Sultan of Fez from 1386 to 1387.

== Life ==
Musa ibn Faris al-Mutawakkil had replaced the Sultan Abul Abbas Ahmad Mustanzir in 1384. His accession was engineered by the Nasrid dynasty of the Emirate of Granada. In 1386 he was replaced by Muhammad ibn Ahmad al-Wathiq, who ruled until 1387. Abul Abbas then regained the throne.
