= Abd al-Haqq I =

Marinid dynasty leader (1157–1217)

- Born: 1157; Zab, Ifriqiya (Current day Algeria)
- Died: 1217 (aged 59–60)
- Spouse: Oum el-Iman bint Ali el-Bethary
- Issue: Uthman ibn Abd al-Haqq; Mohammed ibn Abd al-Haqq; Abu Yahya ibn Abd al-Haqq; Abu Yusuf Yaqub ibn Abd al-Haqq
- Father: Abu Khaled Mayou ben Abu Bakkar

Abu Muhammad Abd al-Haqq I (1157 – 1217) was the first leader of the Marinid dynasty of the Maghreb. He was descended from a noble family from the Zab region, where he was born.

== History ==
The "Banu Marin" (Marinids) were a semi-nomadic Zenata Berber tribe from the Zab region, who in the 12th century were practising transhumance in the region between Figuig and the Moulouya River in what is now eastern Morocco. Unlike many Zenata tribes in the region, they did not join the Almohads as they conquered the Maghrib. Later, their chief Muhyu did fight on the side of the Almohads and participated in the Battle of Alarcos in 1195, where he died of his wounds. Afterwards, leadership of the tribe passed on to Abd al-Haqq (Abd al-Haqq I).

The Almohads suffered a severe defeat against the Christian kingdoms of Iberia on 16 July 1212 in the Battle of Las Navas de Tolosa. The severe loss of life at the battle left the Almohad state weakened and some of its regions partially depopulated. Soon after this, in 1213 or 1214, the Marinids took advantage of the situation and entered in force into the cultivated lands of north-eastern Morocco, under the leadership of Abd al-Haqq. They progressively occupied land as far as the Rif region, forcing settlements and towns to pay taxes to them. In 1217 an Almohad army, joined by the Banu Riyah, an Arab tribe, and a dissident Marinid clan, defeated Abd al-Haqq in battle. Abd al-Haqq was killed and the Marinids were repelled from the region for a time. Leadership of the Marinids passed on to Abd al-Haqq's son, Uthman (Uthman I).

Preceded by Marinid tribe	Marinid Dynasty; 1195–1217	Succeeded by Uthman I
