= Abu Sa'id Uthman I, Marinid =

Marinid Sheikh (1196–1240)

Uthman ibn Abd al-Haqq

Marinid Sultan
- Reign: 1217–1240
- Predecessor: Abd al-Haqq I
- Successor: Muhammad ibn Abd Al-Haqq
- Born: 1196
- Died: 1240 (aged 43–44)
- Dynasty: Marinid
- Father: Abd al-Haqq I
- Religion: Islam

Abu Said Uthman ibn Abd al-Haqq (Arabic: أبو سعيد عثمان بن عبد الحق) (1196–1240) was a leader of the Marinid Sultanate and son of Abd al-Haqq I.

After the death of his father in 1217, he became sheikh and during his reign fought for control of the western Maghreb against the Almohad Caliphate. In 1240 Uthman was killed by one of his Christian slaves.

Preceded by Abd al-Haqq I	Marinid Dynasty; 1217–1240	Succeeded by Muhammad I
