= Abdelhak Mrini =

Moroccan historian and writer (1934–2025)

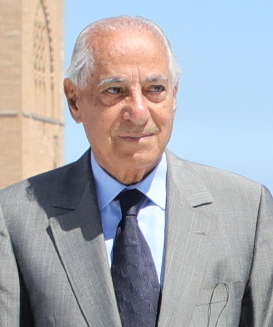
- Mrini in 2019
- Born: 31 May 1934; Rabat, French protectorate in Morocco
- Died: 2 June 2025 (aged 91)
- Occupations: Intellectual, civil servant, historian
- Employer: Mohammed VI of Morocco
- Known for: Adviser of Mohammed VI of Morocco
- Notable work: Al-Jaysh al-maghribi abra at-tarikh

Abdelhak Mrini (Arabic: عبد الحق المريني; alternatively spelled El Merini, Lamrini or Lemrini; 31 May 1934 – 2 June 2025) was a Moroccan historian, civil servant and writer.

== Life and career ==
Abdelhak Mrini was born in Rabat on 31 May 1934. He studied history at the University of al-Qarawiyyin.

Mrini authored several books and was awarded the Moroccan Book Prize for Al-Jaysh al-maghribi abra at-tarikh (The Moroccan Army Through History).

Beginning in December 2010, he was the Moroccan government's chief historian, replacing Hassan Aourid, and beginning in October 2012, the spokesman of the Royal Palace of Mohammed VI. As spokesman for the palace, after having kept to press releases, he spoke for the first time in an article — via the London-based, Arabic-language daily Acharq Al-Awsat in July 2013.

Mrini died on 2 June 2025, at the age of 91.
