= Abu Faris Abd al-Aziz I =

Marinid Sultan from 1366 to 1372

Marinid Sultan
- Reign: 1366 – 1372
- Predecessor: Muhammad II ibn Faris
- Successor: Muhammad III ibn Abd al-Aziz
- Born: 1349
- Died: 1372 (aged 22–23)
- Issue: Muhammad III ibn Abd al-Aziz
- Dynasty: Marinid
- Religion: Islam

Abu Faris al-Mustansir Abd al-Aziz ibn Ali (Arabic: أبو فارس المستنصر عبد العزيز بن علي) was the Marinid Sultan from 1366 until his death in 1372. He assumed the throne at a time when Marinid authority was in decline, but during his rule managed to reverse this trend. After his death the kingdom returned to anarchy.

== Biography ==
=== Background ===
Abu Faris Abd al-Aziz came to power at a time when the Moorish states of Granada, Morocco and Tlemcen were all weak, and were all prone to meddling in each other's affairs. Abu Faris was one of the sons of Abu al-Hasan ibn Uthman, and before coming to the throne was held captive in the palace of Fez.

=== Reign as Sultan ===
In 1366 Sultan Muhammad II ibn Faris tried to remove the vizier Umar bin Abdulla al-Yabani from office, and was killed in response. Abu Faris Abdul-Aziz came to the throne. Once he was firmly in control he had the vizier killed. Abu Faris was one of the more decisive of the Marinid rulers. He defeated the neighboring Zayyanid kingdom of Tlemcen, to the east. Abu Faris also reestablished control over Marrakesh, where a Marinid prince supported by the Hintata chief of the Atlas Mountains had seceded from the sultanate of Fez.

When Abu Faris captured Tlemcen he took the diplomat Ibn Khaldun (1332–1406) prisoner, and enlisted him in his own service. Later Ibn Khaldun was to establish lasting fame for his great world history, which he started to write around 1372. Ibn Ridwan al-Malaqi (1318–1381), author of a major treatise on political ethics, was another of Abu Faris's senior administrators. He gave asylum to Lisan ad-Din ibn al-Khatib, former vizier of Muhammed V of Granada. Abu Faris arranged for the Marinid forces in Gibraltar to help al-Khatib to escape to Morocco. He built the Muristan al-Azizi (Azizi Hospital) in Fez and an adjacent fountain that have both survived until modern times.

Abu Faris died in 1372 and was succeeded by his infant son Muhammad abu Zayyan as-Saîd II. The kingdom again descended into anarchy. In 1374 Muhammad V of Granada took control of Gibraltar.
