= Lalla Aouda Mosque =

Mosque in Meknes, Morocco

- مسجد لالة عودة (Arabic) ⵎⴻⵣⴳⵉⴷⴰ ⵍⴰⵍⴰ ⵄⴰⵡⴷⴰ (Berber)
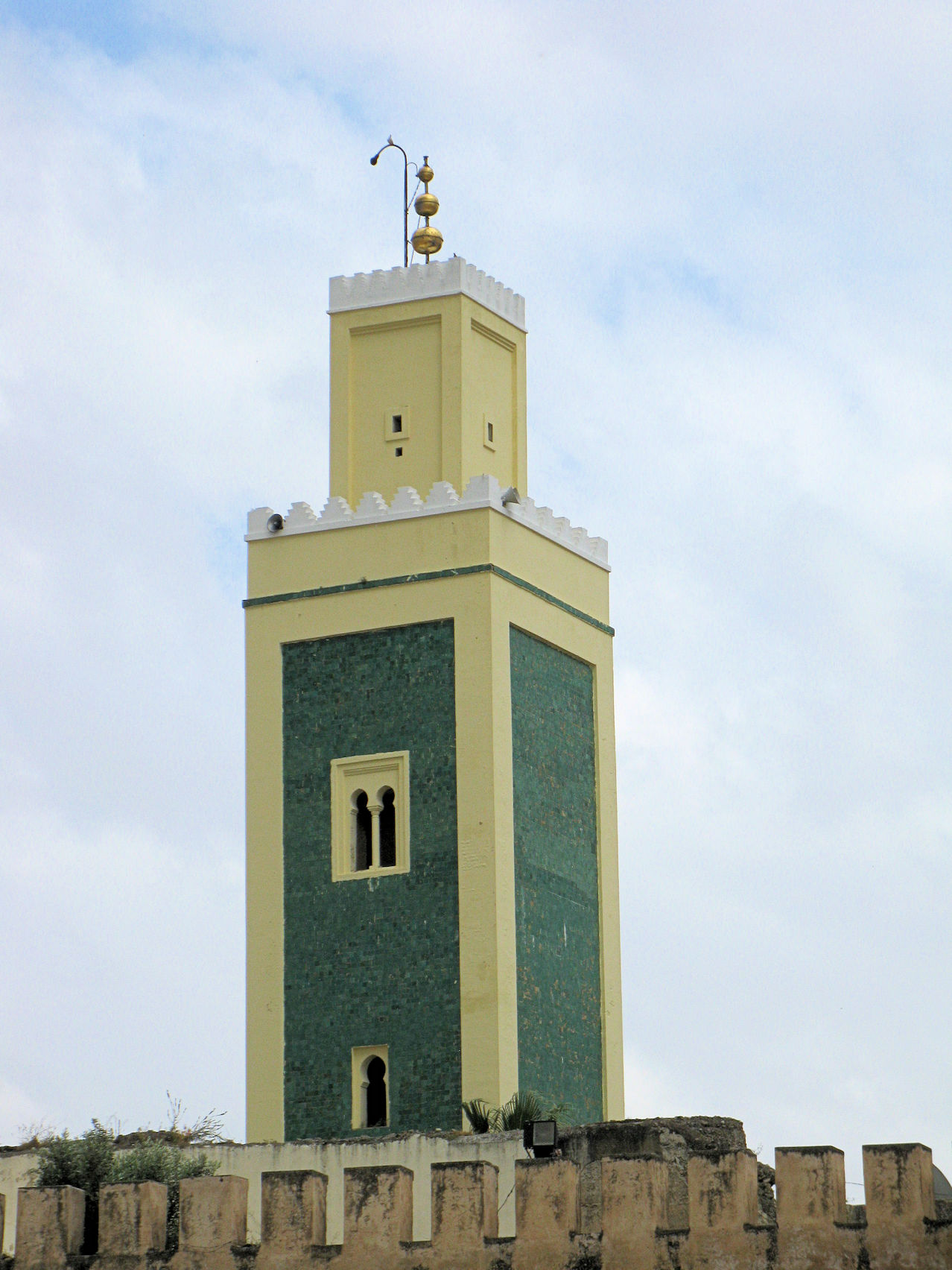
- Minaret of the mosque

Religion
- Affiliation: Islam
- Sect: Sunni (Maliki)
- Status: active

Location
- Location: Meknes, Morocco
- Interactive map of Lalla Aouda Mosque
- Coordinates: 33°53′35″N 5°33′41.1″W

Architecture
- Type: Mosque
- Style: Moroccan, Islamic
- Founder: Abu Yusuf Ya'qub (but subsequently remodeled by Moulay Isma'il ibn Sharif)
- Established: 1276 CE (first mosque); 1672-78 CE (current mosque)
- Minaret: 1

The Lalla Aouda Mosque or Mosque of Lalla 'Awda (Arabic: مسجد لالة عودة, romanized: masjid lalla 'awda; Berber languages: ⵎⴻⵣⴳⵉⴷⴰ ⵍⴰⵍⴰ ⵄⴰⵡⴷⴰ, romanized: mezgita lalla 'awda) is a large historic mosque in Meknes, Morocco. It was originally the mosque of the Marinid kasbah (citadel) of the city, built in 1276, but was subsequently remodeled into the royal mosque of the Alaouite sultan Moulay Isma'il's imperial palace in the late 17th century.

== History ==
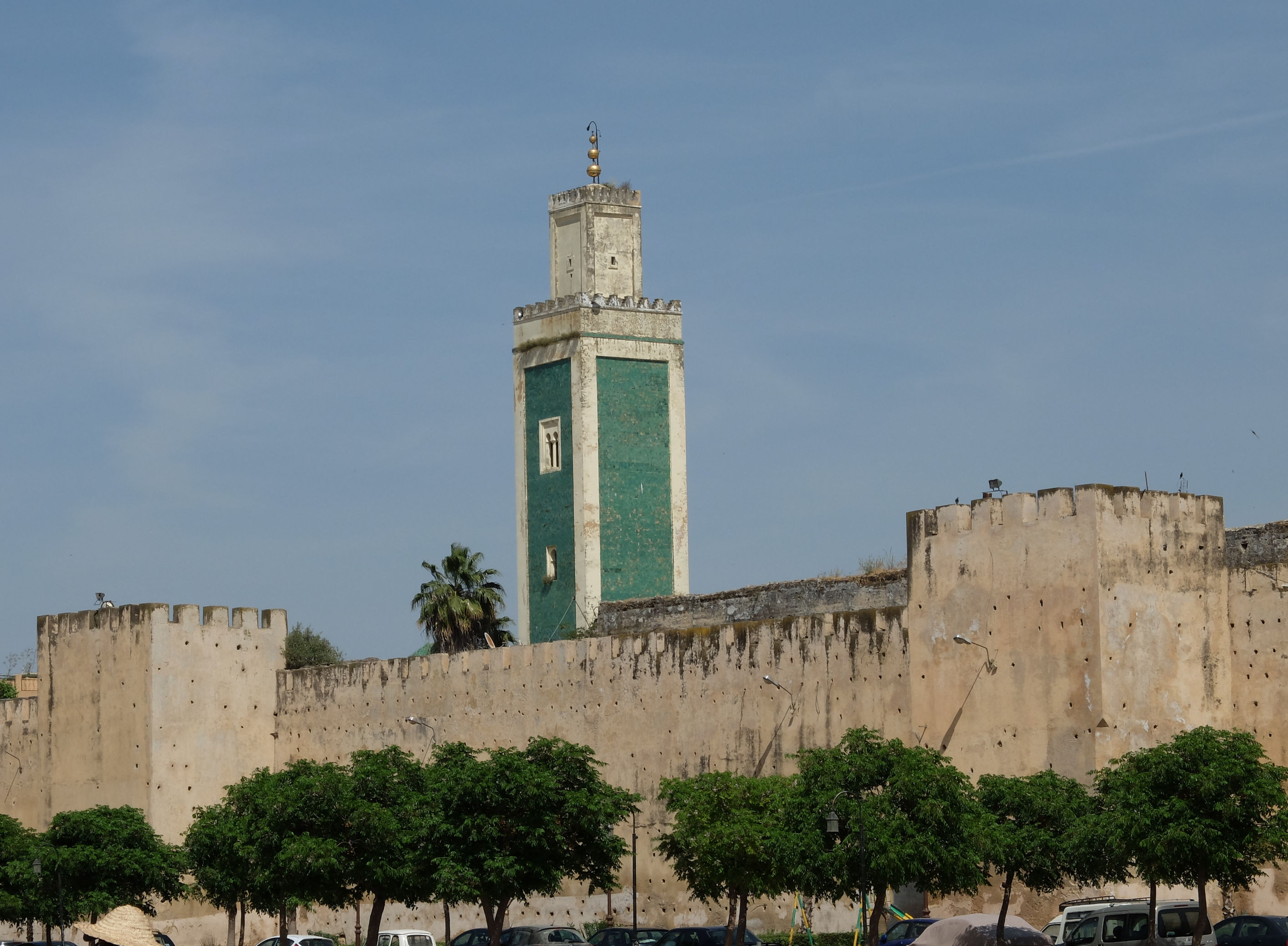
The minaret of the mosque rising behind the ramparts of the former royal palace, seen from Place Lalla Aouda

The mosque was originally founded in 1276 CE by the Marinid sultan Abu Yusuf Ya'qub as the main mosque of the kasbah (citadel) which the sultan built that same year. It was thus originally known as the Mosque of the Kasbah (Jama' al-Qasba), whereas its current name (Mosque of Lalla Aouda) dates from the Saadian or Alaouite period (16th century or later). The name "Lalla Aouda" refers to Lalla Masuda, a waliya (saint) and the mother of the Saadian sultan Ahmad al-Mansur, to whom some accounts attribute the foundation of the mosque.

The remains of both the original Marinid kasbah and the original Marinid mosque have been heavily obscured due to the Alaouite sultan Moulay Isma'il's monumental construction projects in the late 17th century as part of his creation of a new imperial city in Meknes. He expanded or rebuilt the Lalla Aouda Mosque, with construction taking place between 1672 and 1678. It became the first mosque of his new imperial capital, integrated into the palace known as Dar al-Kebira. The vast square on the northwest side of the mosque, known today as Place Lalla Aouda, was originally the main mechouar of Moulay Isma'il's palace: a square for military parades and other ceremonies attended by the sultan and his officials, off-limits to the general public.

Today the Dar al-Kebira palace is generally in ruins and overtaken by the houses of a residential neighbourhood among its remains, while Place Lalla Aouda is a public square. The mosque continued to undergo some work even in the 20th century and remains well-preserved.

== Architecture ==
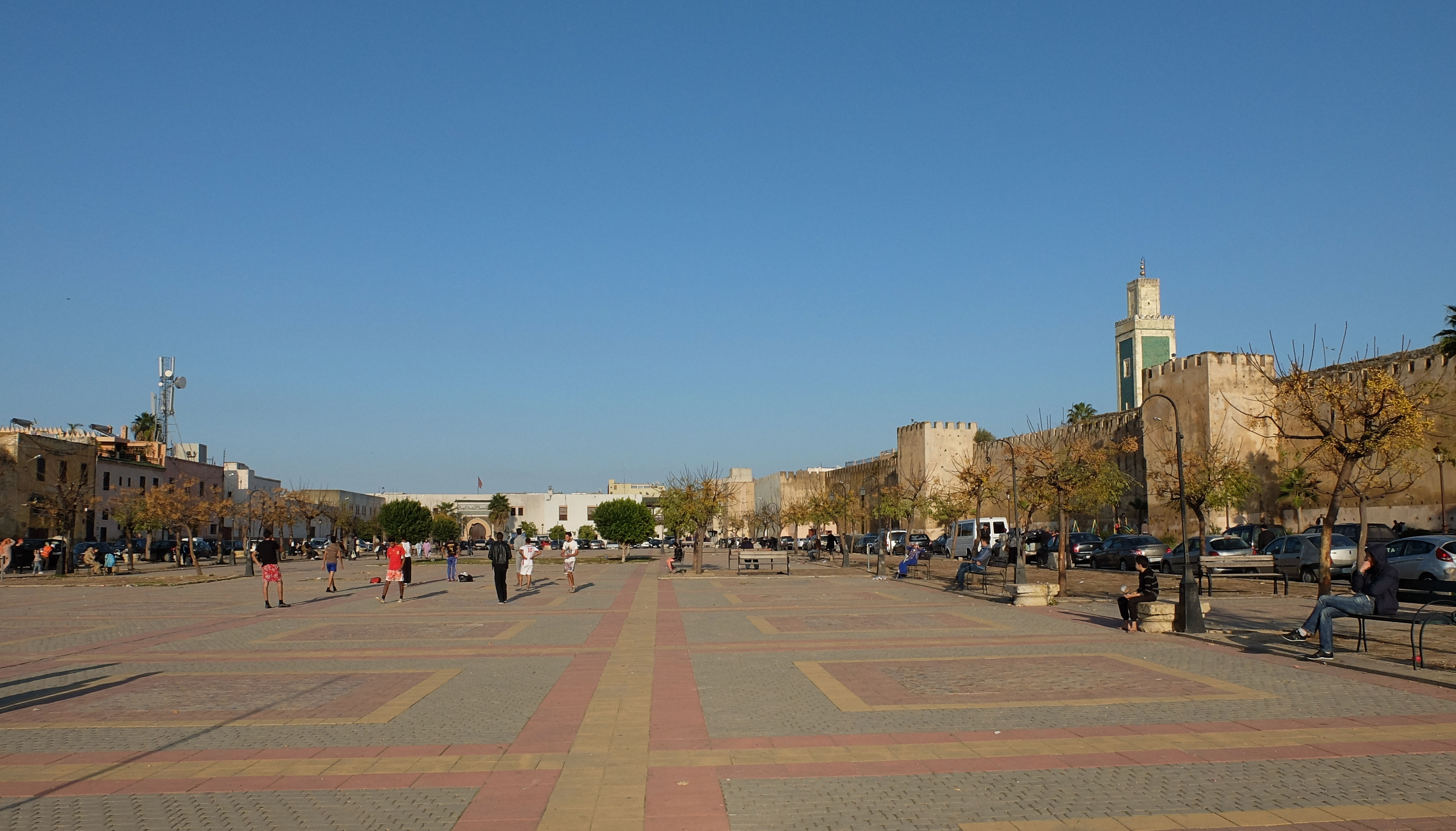
Place Lalla Aouda (Lalla Aouda Square) today

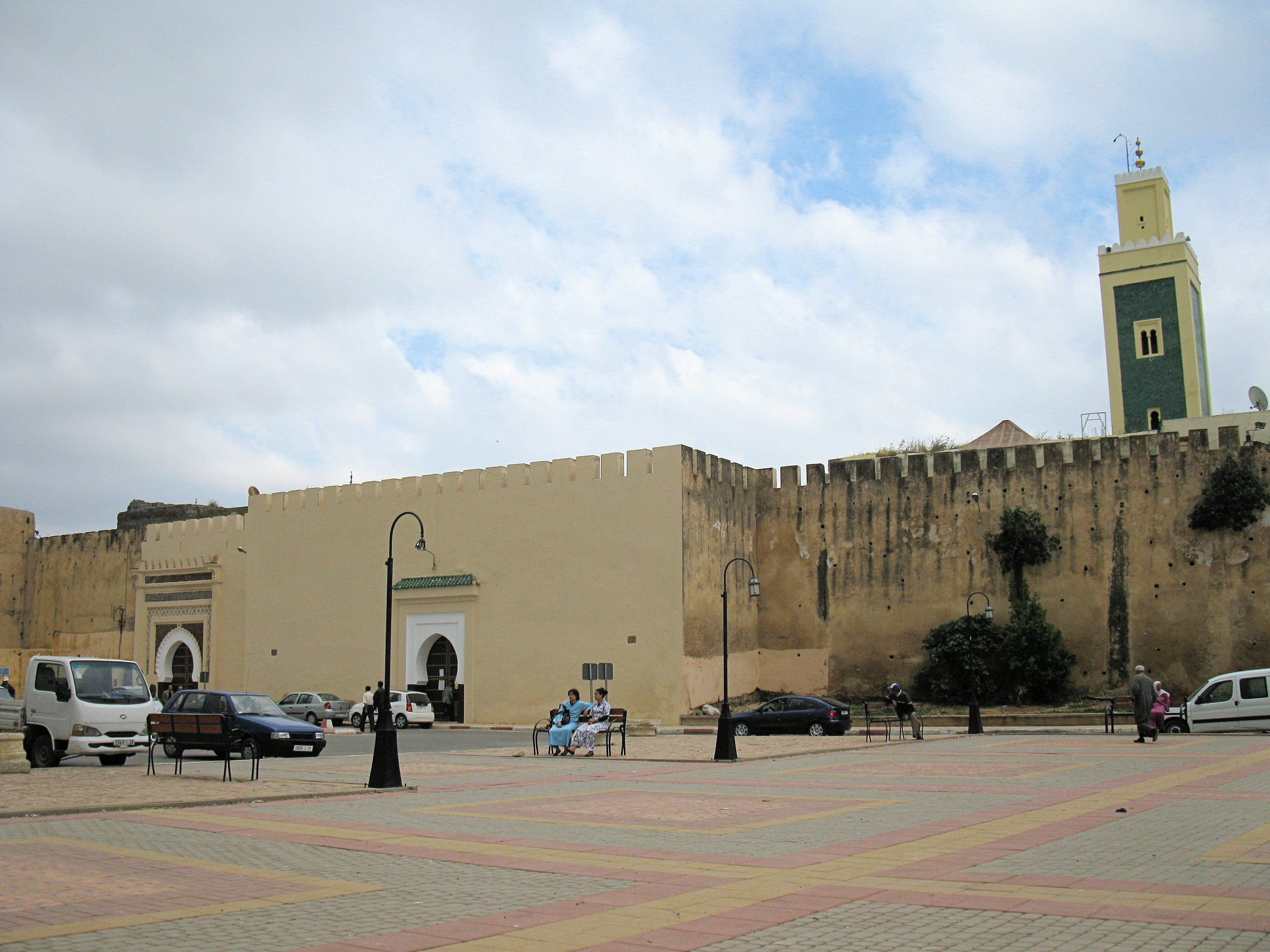
The two gateways to the outer courtyard (acting as either an additional sahn or mechouar) which leads to the mosque. The gates are located in the walls at the eastern end of Lalla Aouda Square. The gate on the far left is more richly decorated.

The mosque is one of the largest in Meknes and is located southeast of the old medina, off the eastern end of the large square known as Place Lalla Aouda (named after it) located behind the monumental gate of Bab Mansour.

=== The mechouar entrance ===
The mosque's main public entrance was on its northwest side, accessed from Place Lalla Aouda. Here, towards the eastern end of the square, are two gateways that lead to another small open square or courtyard which is identified as both a sahn (mosque courtyard) and a mechouar (ceremonial square typically found at the entrance of Moroccan royal palaces). This mechouar entrance to the mosque is a feature it shares with the Berrima Mosque in Marrakesh. The two gates on Place Lalla Aouda include a plain horseshoe-arch gateway in a slightly projecting portion of the ramparts, while to the left of this the second gateway has a more ornamental appearance. This second gateway is surrounded by colourful tilework (zellij), including an Arabic inscription in black letters near the top of the gateway. The inscription attributes the gate to Moulay Isma'il and dates the completion of the gate to the beginning of Jumada II in 1090 AH (1679 CE). The rectangular mechouar courtyard behind the gates appears to have been modified after Moulay Isma'il's reign and is planted with several orange trees. A wall fountain (saqqaya) decorated with green and white zellij tiles and sheltered by a wooden canopy is found on its southeast wall.

=== Between the mechouar and the mosque ===
The space between the mechouar courtyard and the mosque itself, The southeast wall of the mechouar courtyard is pierced by several gates. The leftmost gate, near the center of the wall, leads to a passage going towards the mosque. The next door to the right of this leads to small narrow ablutions room, and to the right of this is a larger gate leading to what is now a rectangular prayer hall with a mihrab, measuring 11.09 by 8.19 meters. This prayer hall, however, used to be a madrasa, the remains of which were still present in the early 20th century. The last gate to the right leads to another passage towards the mosque. The passage was likely a later addition which required the demolition of the western part of the old madrasa, even before the 20th century.

Beyond these passages and rooms is a transverse corridor running along the north edge of the mosque. At its southwest end is the minaret and at the northeastern end is the entrance to the mosque's main ablutions house (Dar al-Wudu). The latter is a rectangular building centered around a courtyard with a rectangular water basin at its center. The courtyard is paved with zellij tiling. Around it are 13 latrine rooms accessed by small horseshoe-arch doorways.

=== The mosque ===
The mosque itself occupies an area measuring 48 by 45.5 meters. From the corridor to the northwest the mosque can be entered via one of three doorways which lead to the gallery around the main rectangular sahn (courtyard) of the mosque. Like many mosque courtyards in Morocco, it has a central fountain and is surrounded by arcades of horseshoe arches. On the southeast side (opposite the entrances) the archways lead to the main prayer hall. On the lateral sides of the courtyard (to the southwest and northeast) are two gates each leading to a large chamber; a layout similar to the Bou Inania Madrasa and whose origin is traced to the iwans of Iranian mosques. The chamber to the northeast is a prayer hall reserved for women, while the one to the southwest originally served as a library. At the middle of the northwest side of the sahn, above the central entrance, is a chamber above the gallery of the courtyard which served as the Dar al-Muwaqqit or Chamber of the Timekeeper (muwaqqit), which is marked on the outside by a double-arched window overlooking the courtyard.

The main prayer hall is a hypostyle space divided into four transverse "naves" by rows of nine horseshoe arches running parallel to the southeast or qibla wall. The aisle that runs through the middle arches, aligned with the mihrab, is wider than the others, as is the last transverse nave directly in front of the southeast wall, thus corresponding to the traditional "T-plan" layout of medieval Moroccan mosques. The mihrab, a niche with a horseshoe arch opening symbolizing the qibla (direction of prayer), is highlighted with stucco-carved decoration on the surrounding wall and marble engaged columns. On either side of the mihrab is a door, the one on the right opening onto the storage space of the minbar while the one on the left opens to the imam's chamber and, beyond it, a private passage which connected the mosque with the palace of Moulay Isma'il. This allowed the sultan to enter the mosque separately with his entourage and join prayers directly next to the imam's position in front of the mihrab, a feature shared with other Moroccan royal mosques like the first Kutubiyya Mosque or the Grand Mosque of Fes el-Jdid.

=== The minaret ===
The minaret, standing at the northwest corner of the mosque, is very similar in form and decoration to the 18th-century minaret of the Grand Mosque of Meknes, with its four facades covered in green tiles.

== The minbar and maqsura of the mosque ==
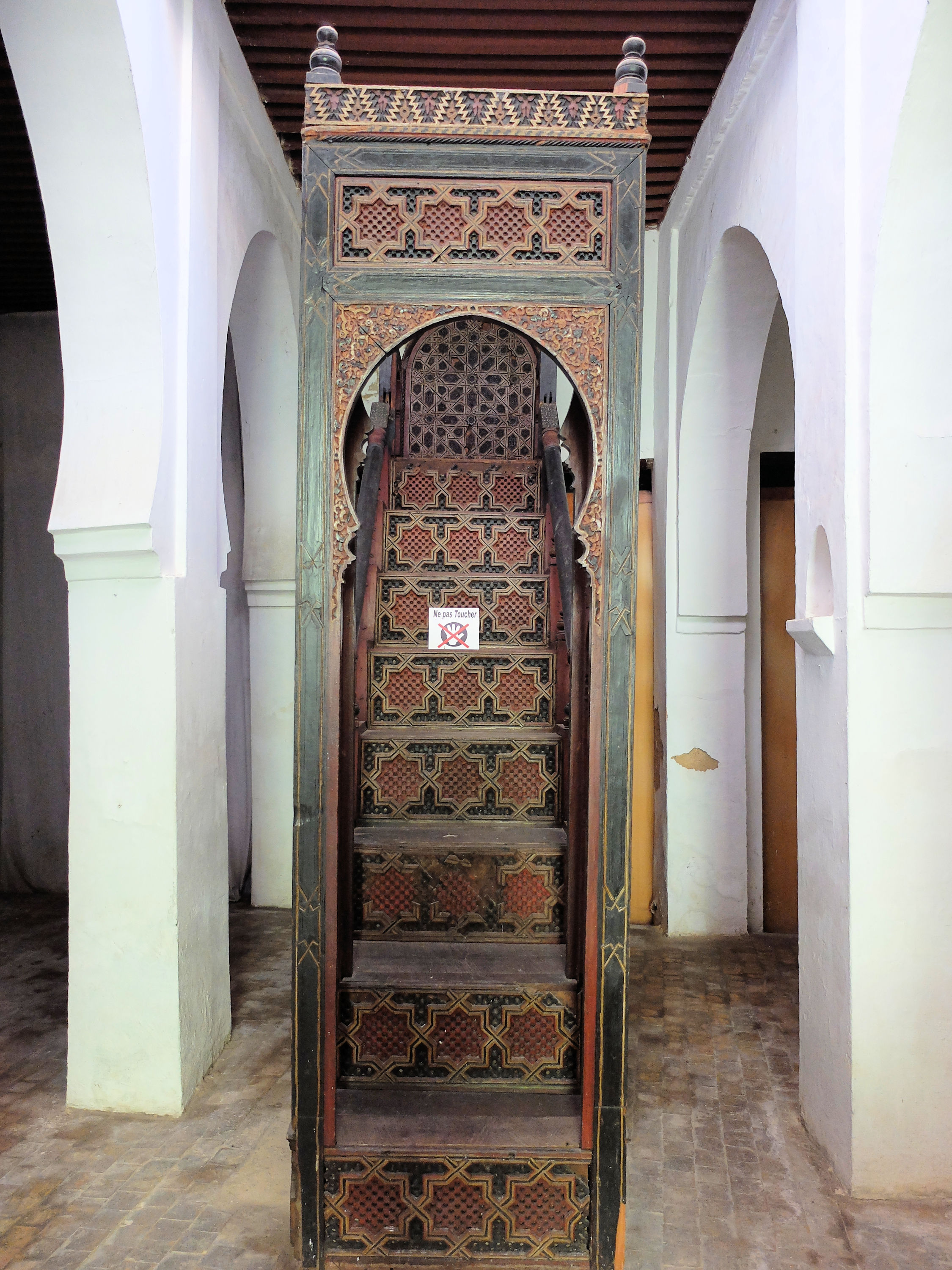
The front of the minbar

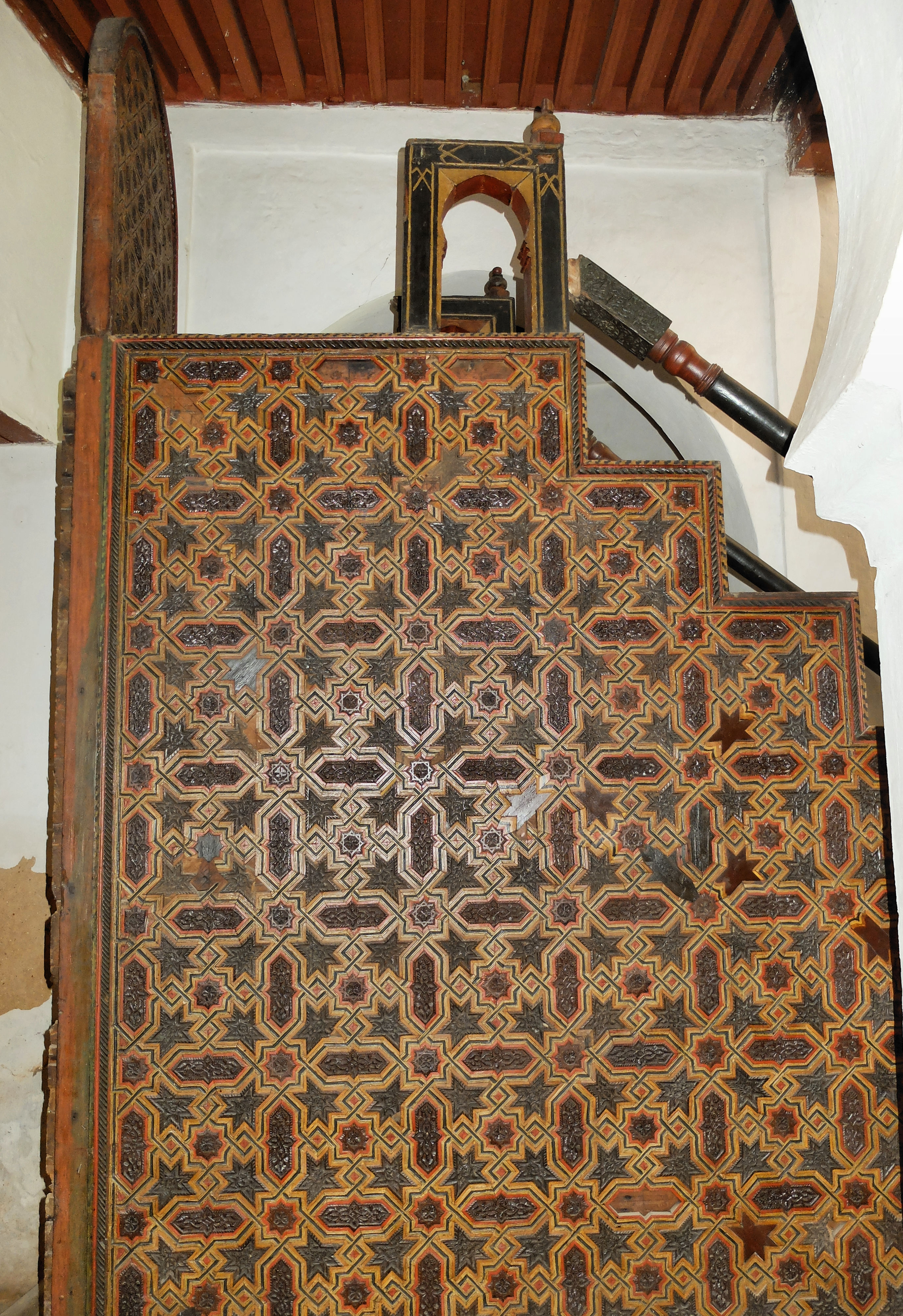
The side of the minbar

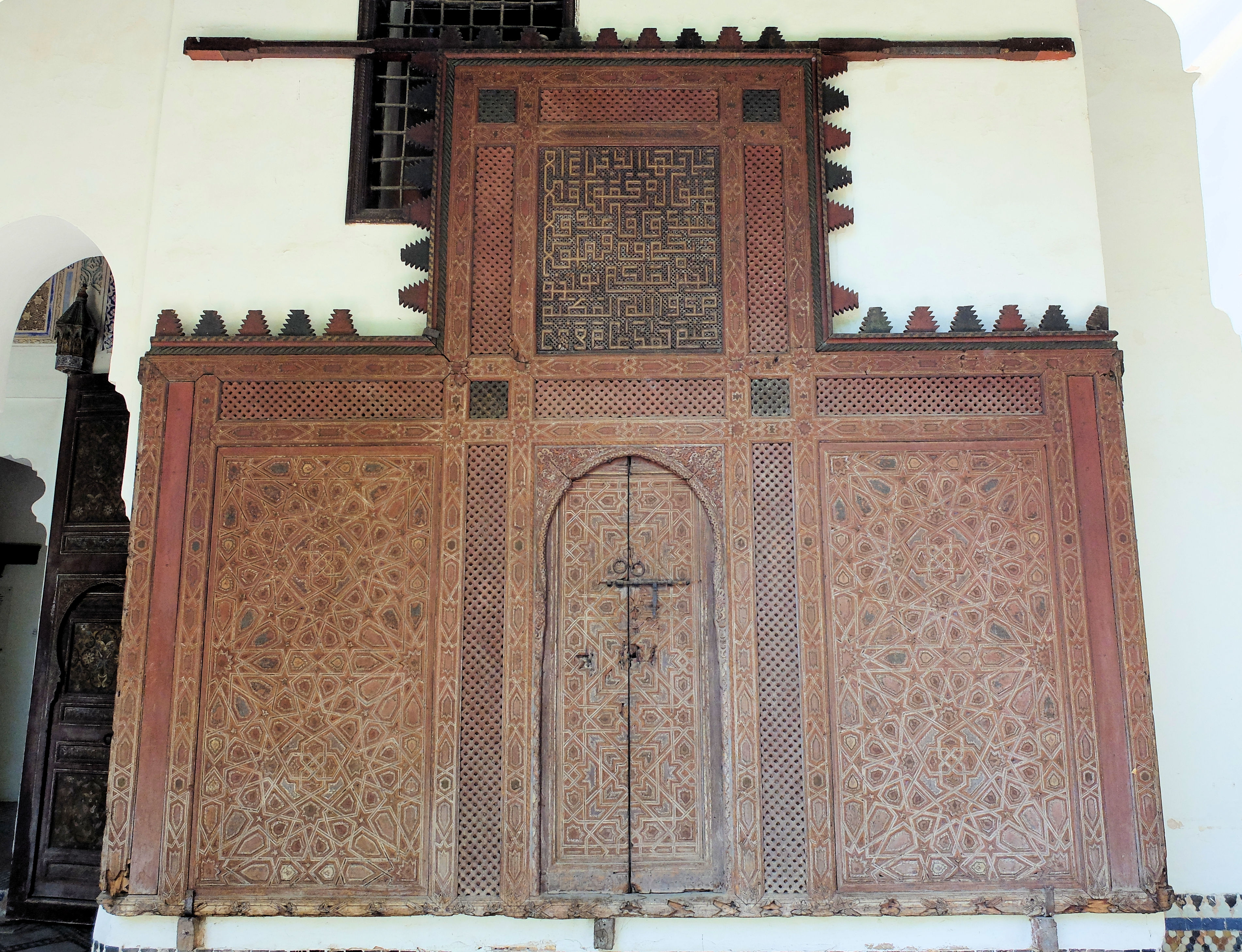
The masqsura of the mosque (now on display at the Dar Jamai Museum)

Both the minbar and the maqsura are now preserved and displayed in the Dar Jamai Museum in Meknes.

=== The minbar ===
The original minbar of the first Marinid mosque is lost, but when Moulay Isma'il rebuilt or expanded the mosque in the late 17th century he commissioned a new minbar. The minbar, now preserved in the Dar Jamai Museum, is 3.25 metres long and 2.57 metres high and has eight steps. Its overall form and decoration is consistent with the traditional minbars of Moroccan mosques since the 12th-century Almoravid Minbar of the Kutubiyya Mosque and the Almohad minbars after it. Much of the minbar is decorated with an eight-pointed star motif, with the main flanks covered in a more elaborate motif found in the earlier minbars. The various polygonal shapes within this motif are inlaid with arabesque-sculpted panels.

=== The maqsura ===
The maqsura is a wooden screen which surrounded an area near the mihrab where the sultan and his immediate entourage prayed. It served to separate the sultan from the rest of the public and to protect him during prayers. The maqsura was installed in the mosque in 1677 (1088 AH) by order of Sultan Moulay Isma'il. Today, only the main central section of the maqsura has been preserved and is on display at the Dar Jamai Museum. It measures 3.55 meters wide and 3.15 meters tall. At its center is a small set of doors within a Moorish archway, and above this is rectangular panel with a Square Kufic inscription composed of a Qur'anic verse (75th verse of Surah al-Hajj) and a statement noting the year of the maqsura's completion.

== See also ==
- Lists of mosques
- List of mosques in Africa
- List of mosques in Morocco
