= Jamai Palace =

Historic late 19th-century mansion in Fes, Morocco

Coordinates: 34°04′09″N 04°58′27″W

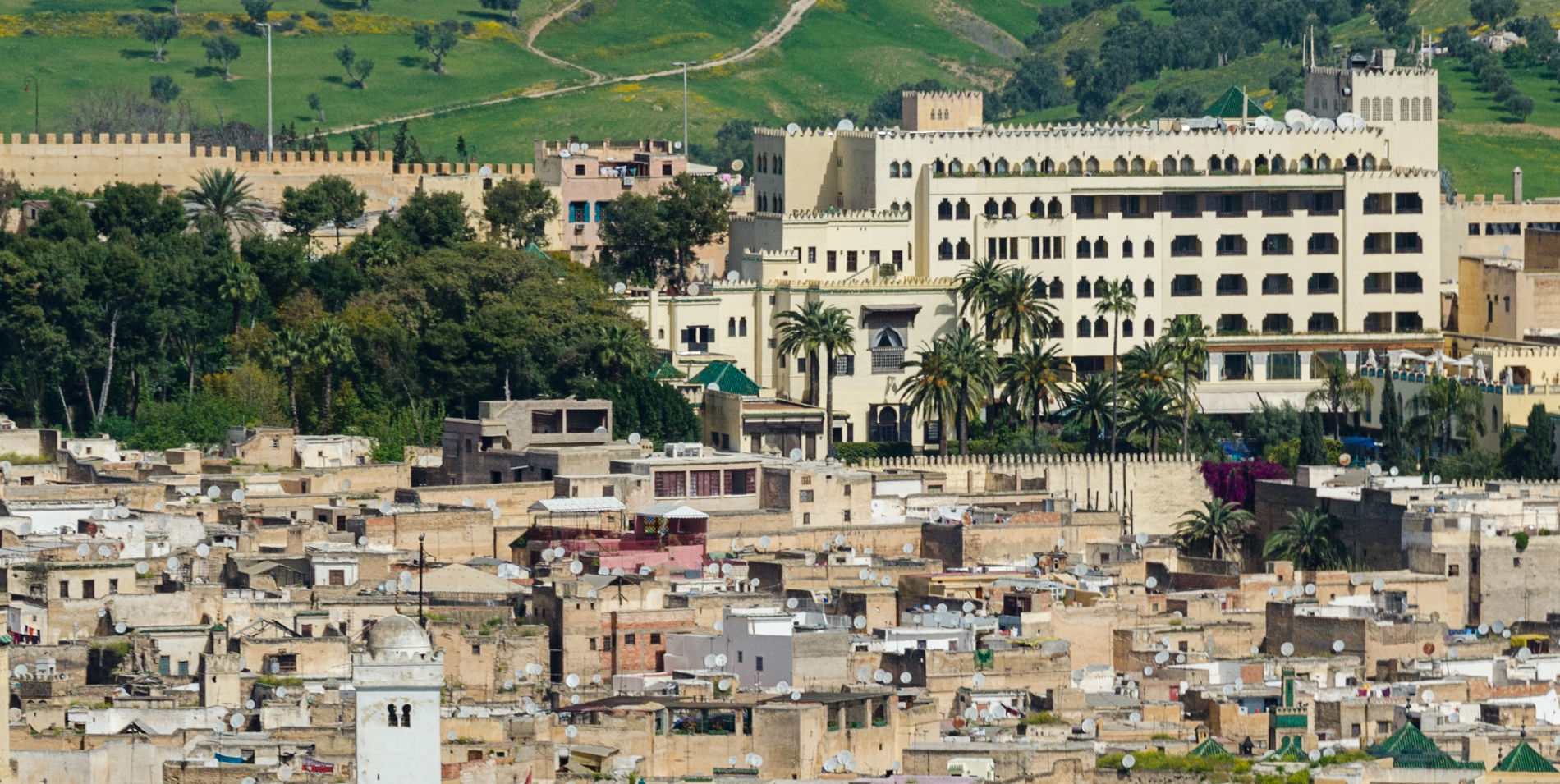
View of the hotel/palace and its adjacent gardens on the skyline of Fes el-Bali

The Jamai Palace, also known as the Dar Jama'i or the Palais Jamaï (Arabic: دار الجامعي / قصر الجامعي), is a historic late 19th-century mansion near Bab Guissa in Fes el-Bali in Fes, Morocco. It was converted to a luxury hotel in 1919, which closed in 2014. It is set to reopen in 2026, following major renovations.

== History ==
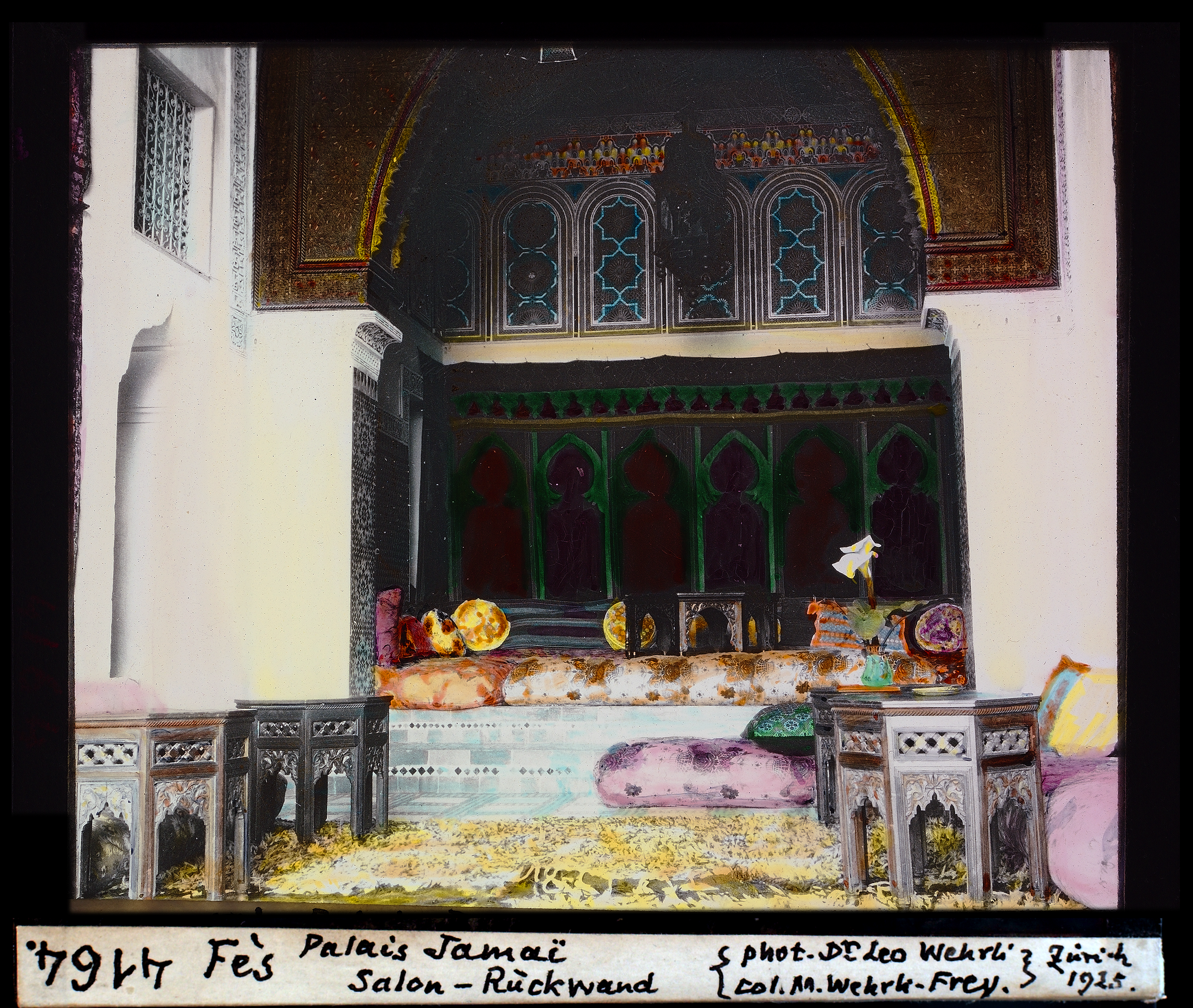
A view of a living room in the palace in 1925, before expansion

The oldest pavilion of the building was begun in 1879 as the residence of Muhammad Ibn al-'Arabi al-Jāmi'i, who, along with his brother, was one of the Grand Viziers of the 'Alawi sultan Moulay Hassan (ruled 1873–1894). The same family also built and owned the Dar Jamai in Meknes (now a museum), built around the same time. Upon the ascension of Sultan Abdelaziz and his Grand Vizier Ba Ahmed (whose family were rivals to the Jamai family) in 1894, the Jamai family lost favour with the court, some of its members were arrested, and its property was seized by the state.

In 1927 the palace was expanded by architect Edmond Gourdain (1885–1968), and in 1929 it was purchased by the Compagnie Générale Transatlantique who transformed it into a hotel for their North African tours. When the company ran into troubles, the hotel was purchased by the Compagnie des chemins de fer du Maroc (ONCF). In the early 1970s, a major new wing, five stories tall, was added. In 1998 the Accor group assumed management of the hotel, which was renovated and reopened it as part of the Sofitel chain. The hotel closed in 2014.

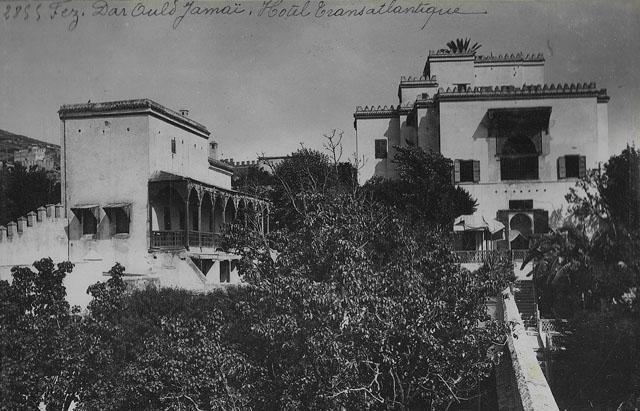
The palace as seen in the 1920s (probably after it was converted to a hotel)

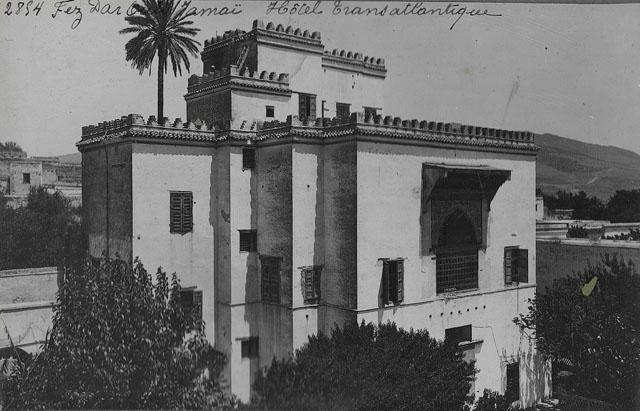
View of the main building of the palace

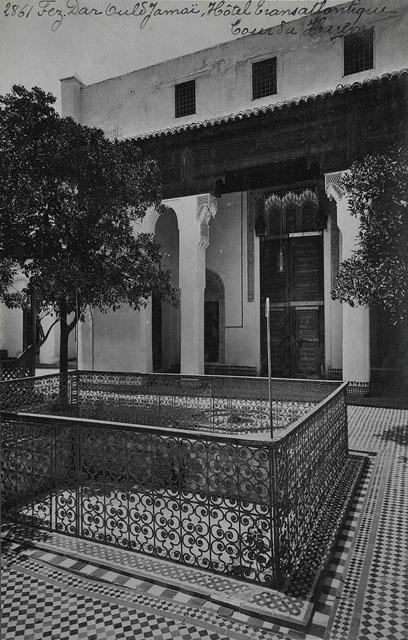
A courtyard in the old palace

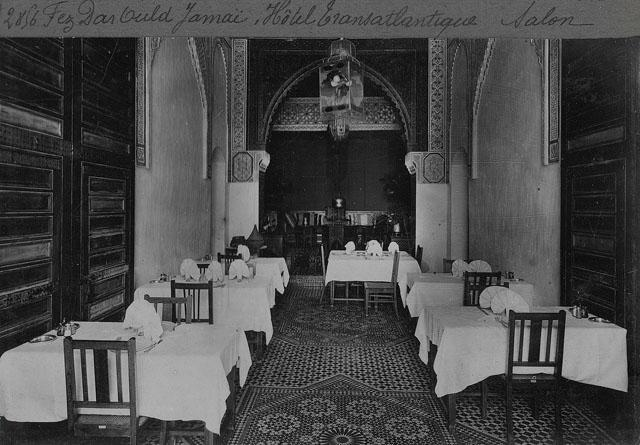
A salon in the old palace

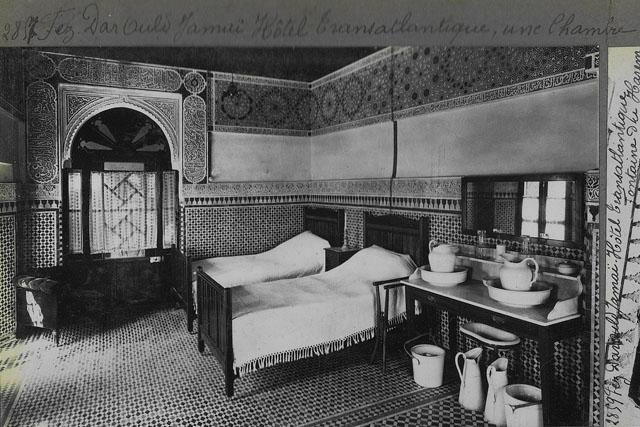
A room in the palace

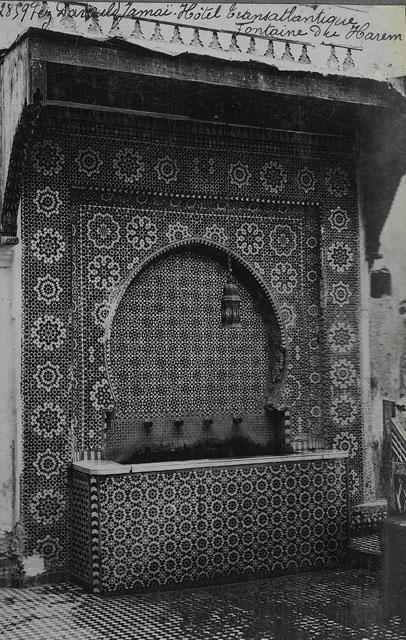
A wall fountain in the palace

== Description ==
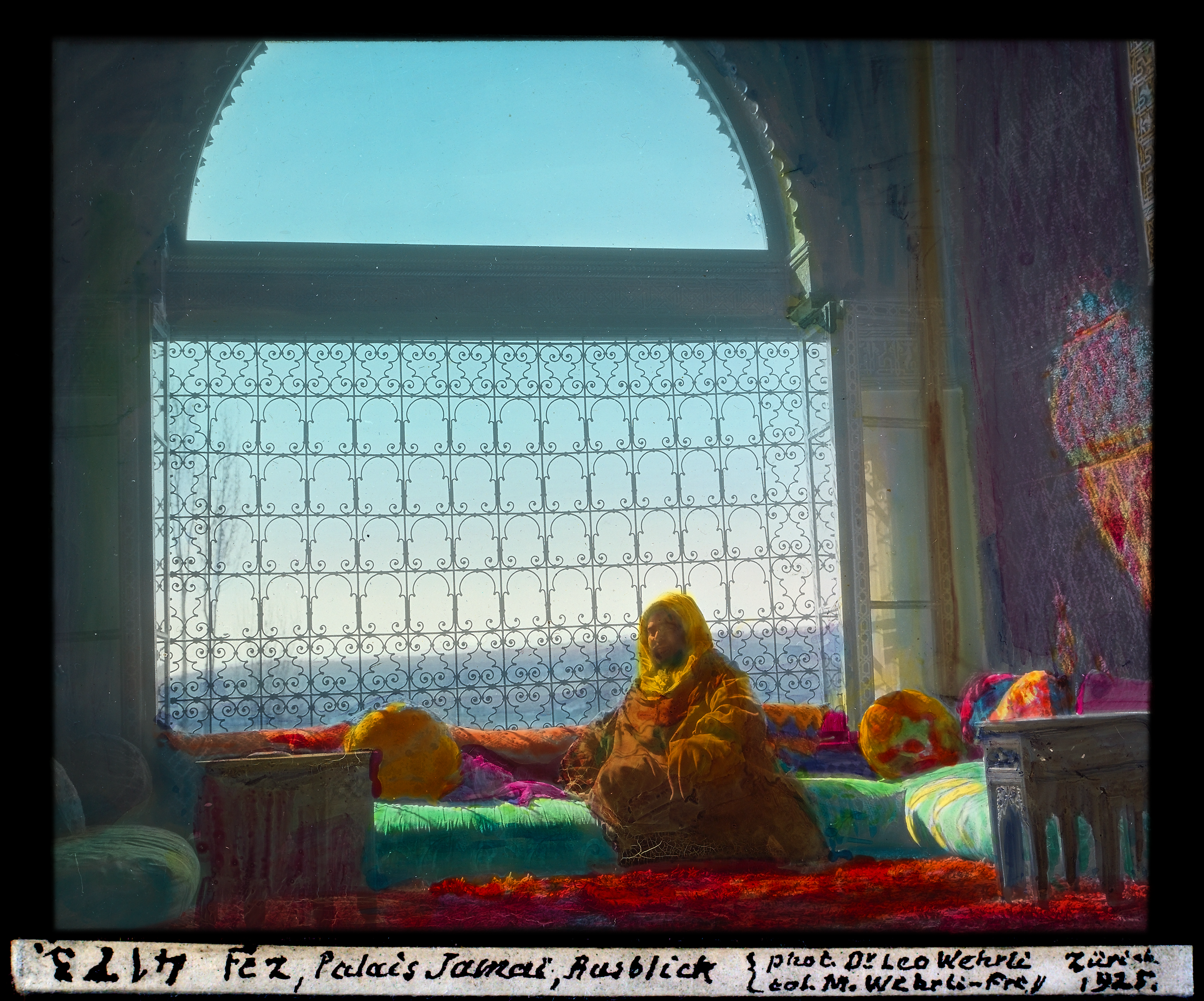
A room with a large window in 1925

The original palace was built in a Moorish-Moroccan style and was surrounded by gardens, on a hill overlooking much of the city near Bab Guissa, the northern gate of Fes el-Bali. Like other palaces and mansions in this style, it included carved stucco and zellij (mosaic tilework) decoration. Subsequent expansions of the hotel have modified the palace grounds and added a modern five-story wing, but have continued to pay tribute to the original Moorish style. In addition to the old pavilion from Jamai's time and the new wing of the hotel, the grounds also include extensive gardens in an Andalusian or Moroccan style (based on the riad model), which partly surround the palace. The gardens include traditional fountains decorated with zellij tilework, including a particularly ornate wall fountain.
