= Dar Jamai Museum =

Museum in Morocco

Coordinates: 33°53′37.8″N 5°33′59″W

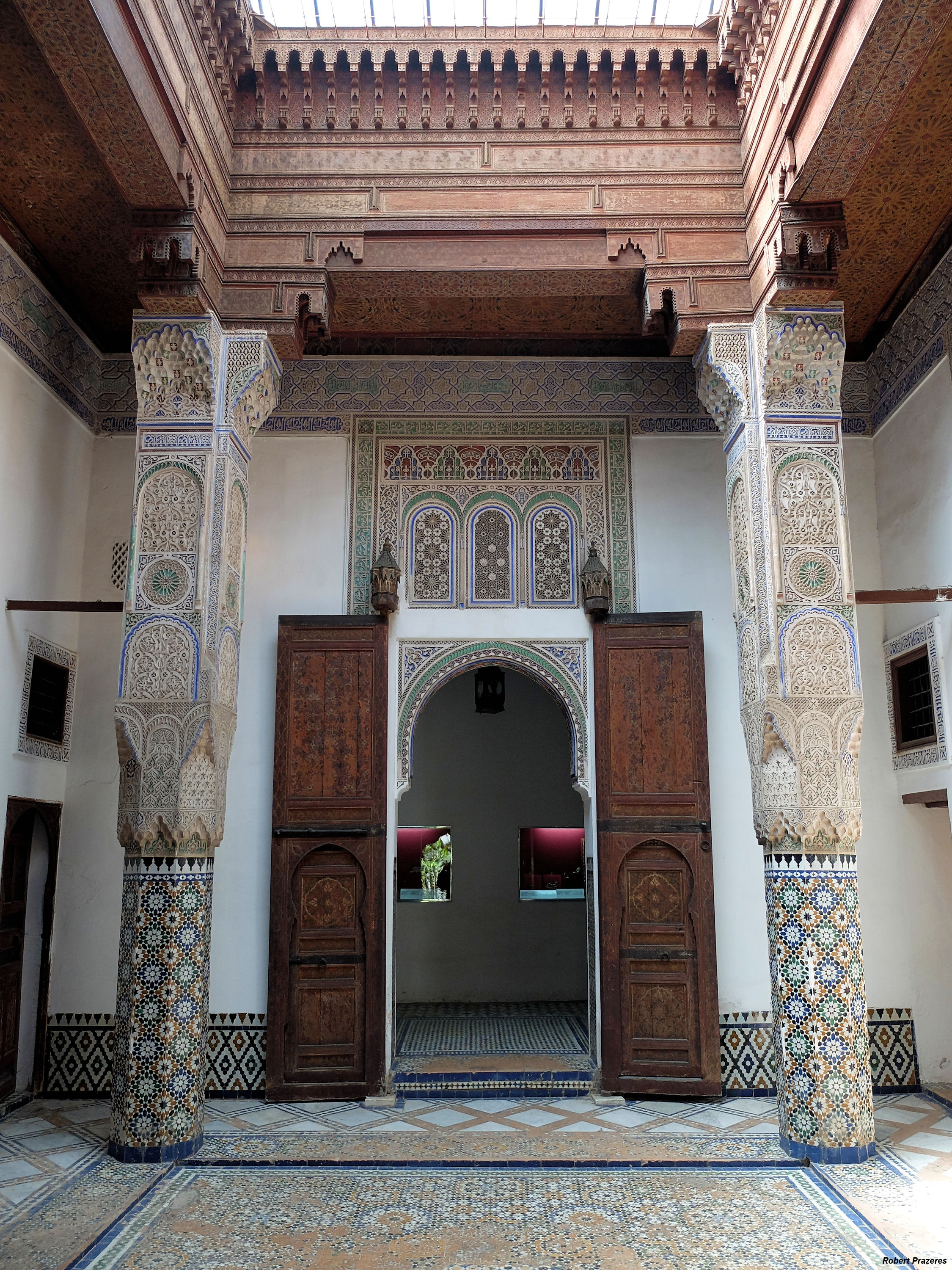
One of the interior courtyards inside the palace

The Dar Jamai Museum (Arabic: قصر دار الجامعي) (also spelled Dar Jamaï or Dar Jama'i) is a museum in Meknes, Morocco. It displays a number of artifacts and art objects from the city and other regions in Morocco. It is housed in a late 19th-century palace built by the Jama'i family who also built the Jamai Palace in Fes.

== History ==
The palace was built in 1882 by Mokhtar ben Arbi el Jama'i, who, along with his brother, served as Grand Vizier under Sultan Moulay Hassan (ruled 1873–1894). His family also built the Jamai Palace in Fes. When Moulay Hassan died in 1894, his younger son Moulay Abdelaziz was installed on the throne with the help of Ba Ahmed, one of the Jama'i family's rivals. The family thus fell out of favour and saw much of their assets, including the palace, confiscated. The palace was then given to the Glaoui family.

In 1912, upon the advent of French colonial rule over Morocco, it was taken over by the French and turned first into a military hospital, then a military court, and finally, in 1920, into a "Museum of Indigenous Arts" (meaning local Moroccan art objects). In 1913 the municipal services commissioned the construction of a large wall fountain on the outside of the palace, facing Place el-Hedim. It is still present today.

== Architecture ==
The palace covers a relatively large area at the northern edge of el-Hedim Square in the old city. It is designed according to traditional Moroccan architecture, decorated with sculpted and painted wood, carved stucco, and colourful zellij mosaic tilework. In addition to various rooms on multiple floors, it contains a large courtyard garden (riad) with orange trees and a menzeh (observation pavilion or platform). The palace also had other facilities including kitchens, a mosque, and a small hammam (bathhouse). An old upstairs reception room or salon with rich decoration and a wooden cupola ceiling has also been outfitted with traditional upper-class furnishings and is considered one of the highlights of the museum. Outside the palace is a large street fountain (mentioned above), covered in elaborate zellij, which is adjoined to the exterior of wall of the palace and faces Place el-Hedim. The current entrance, next to this fountain, was created recently and replaces the original entrance which was off a nearby street.

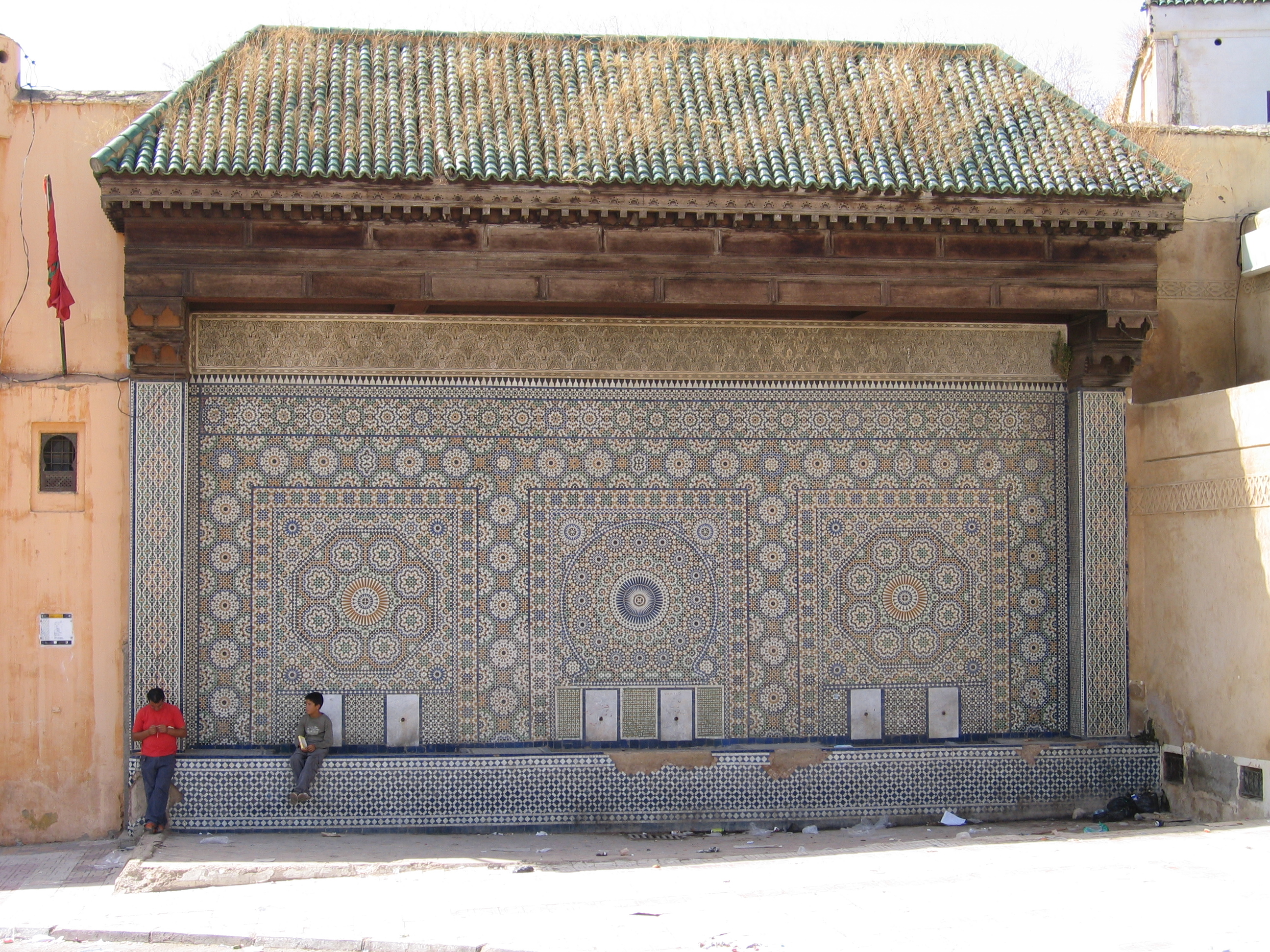
Large street fountain on the exterior wall of the palace, facing Place el-Hedim

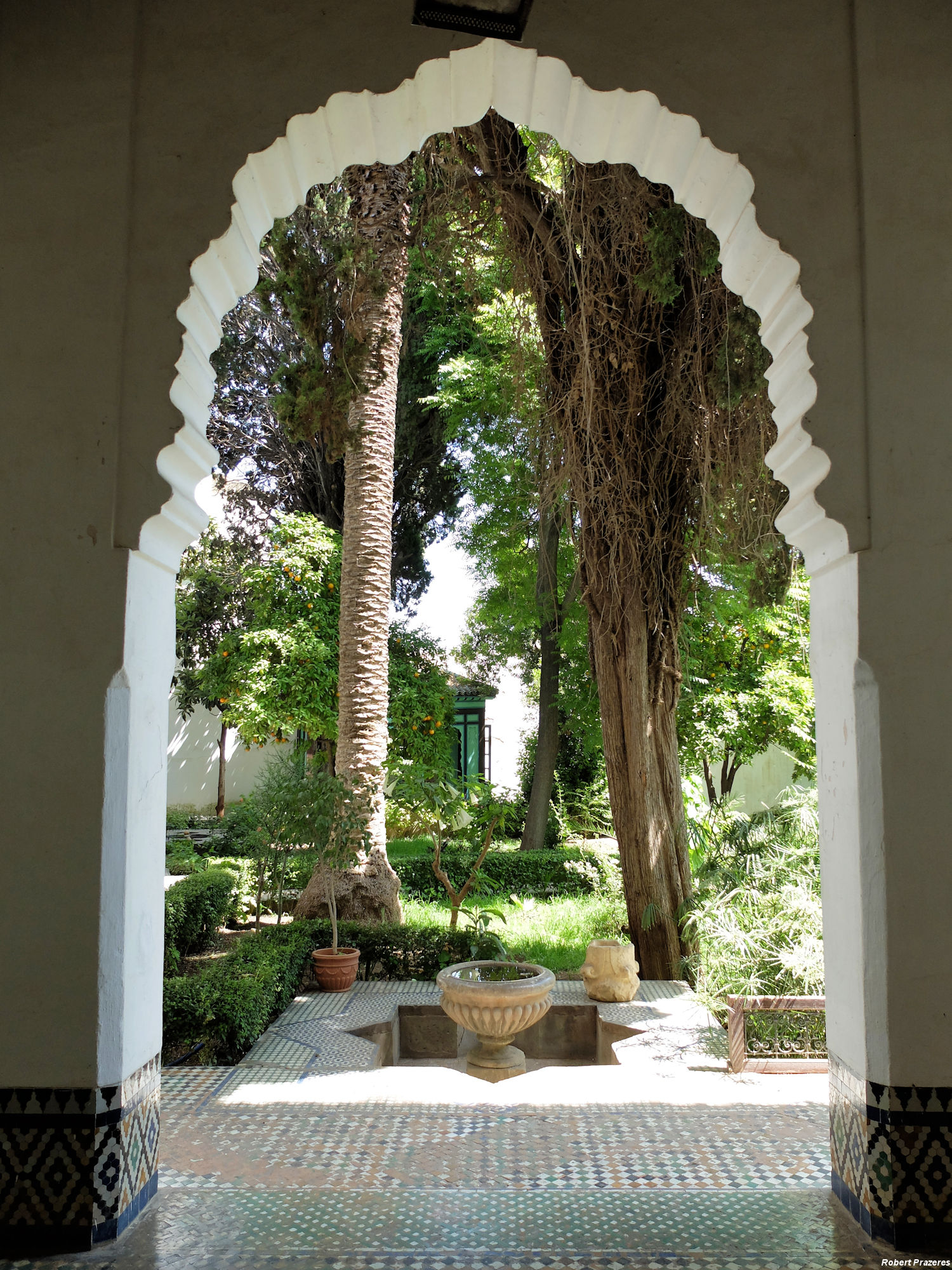
View of the fountain and trees in the courtyard garden of the palace

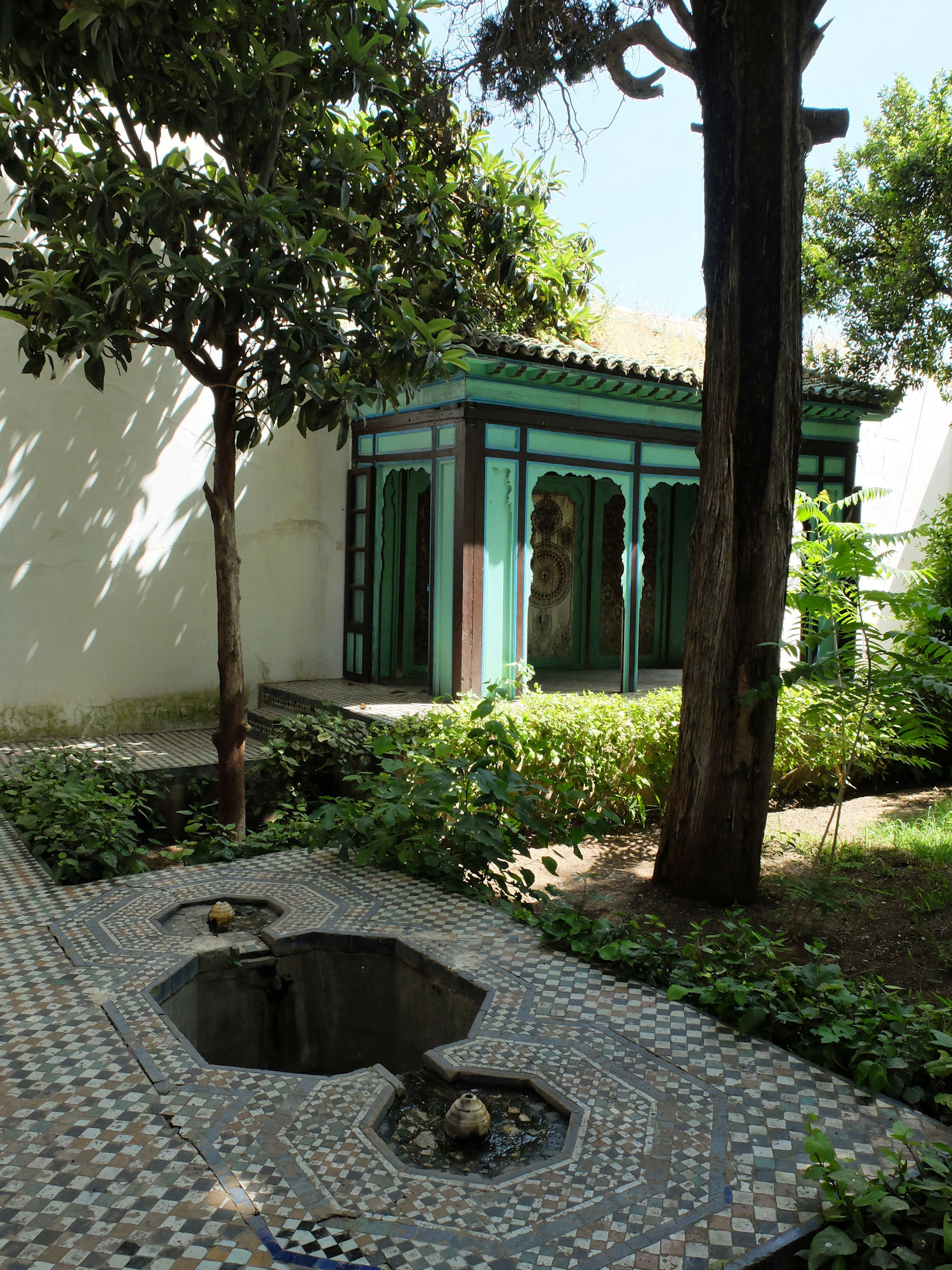
A fountain and menzeh (observation pavilion) in the courtyard garden of the palace

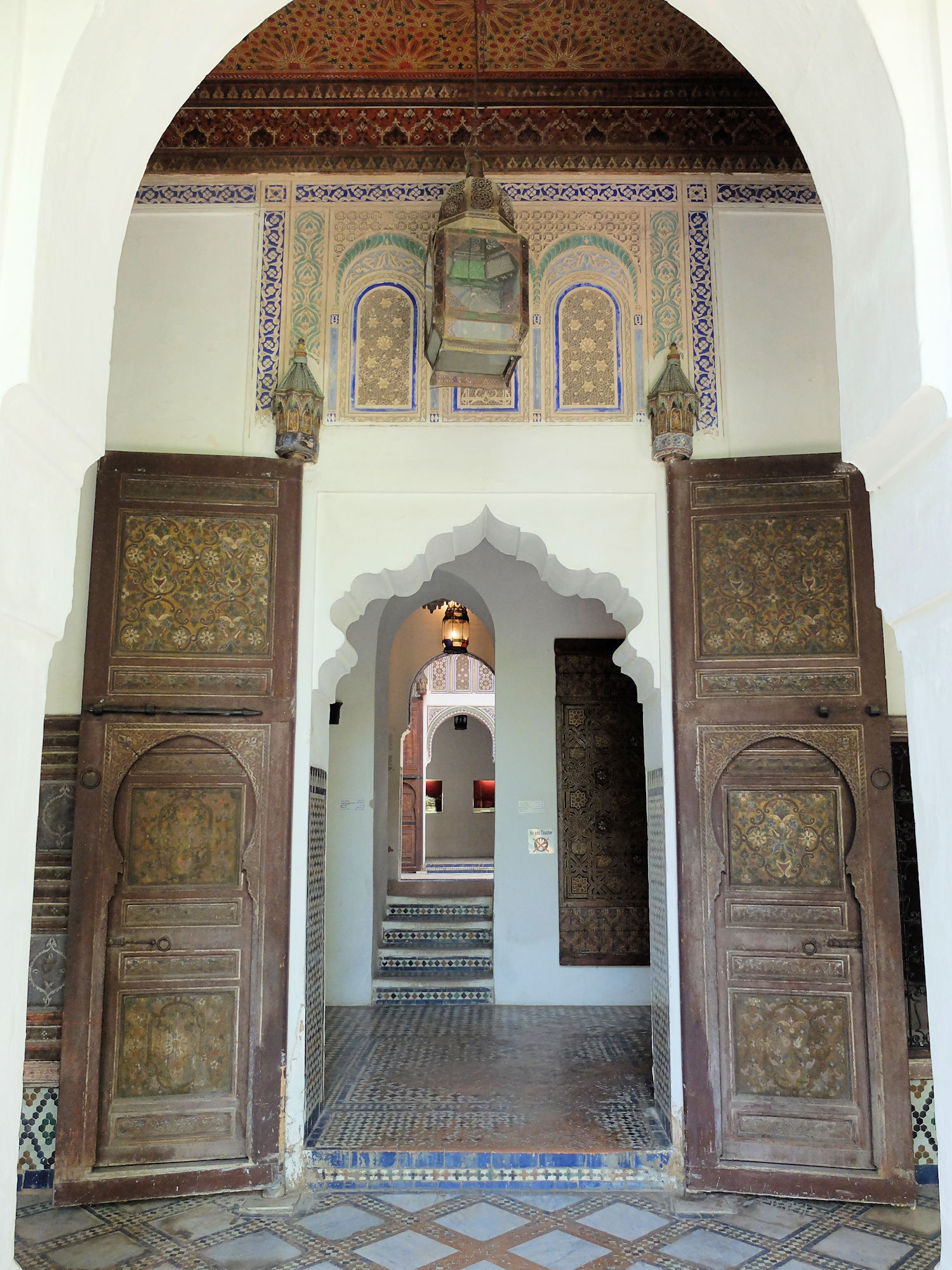
Doorways and rooms of the palace

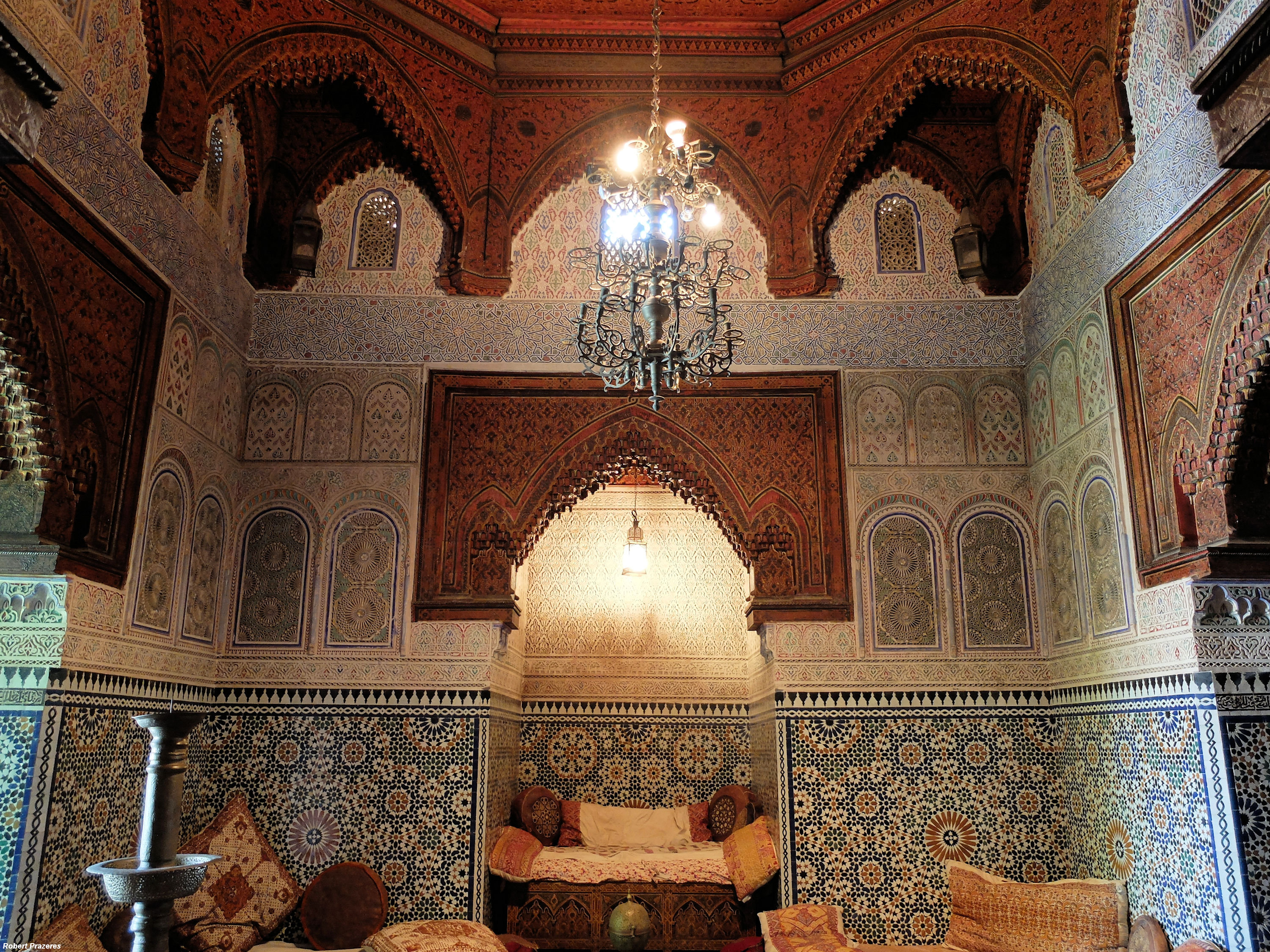
The restored upstairs salon

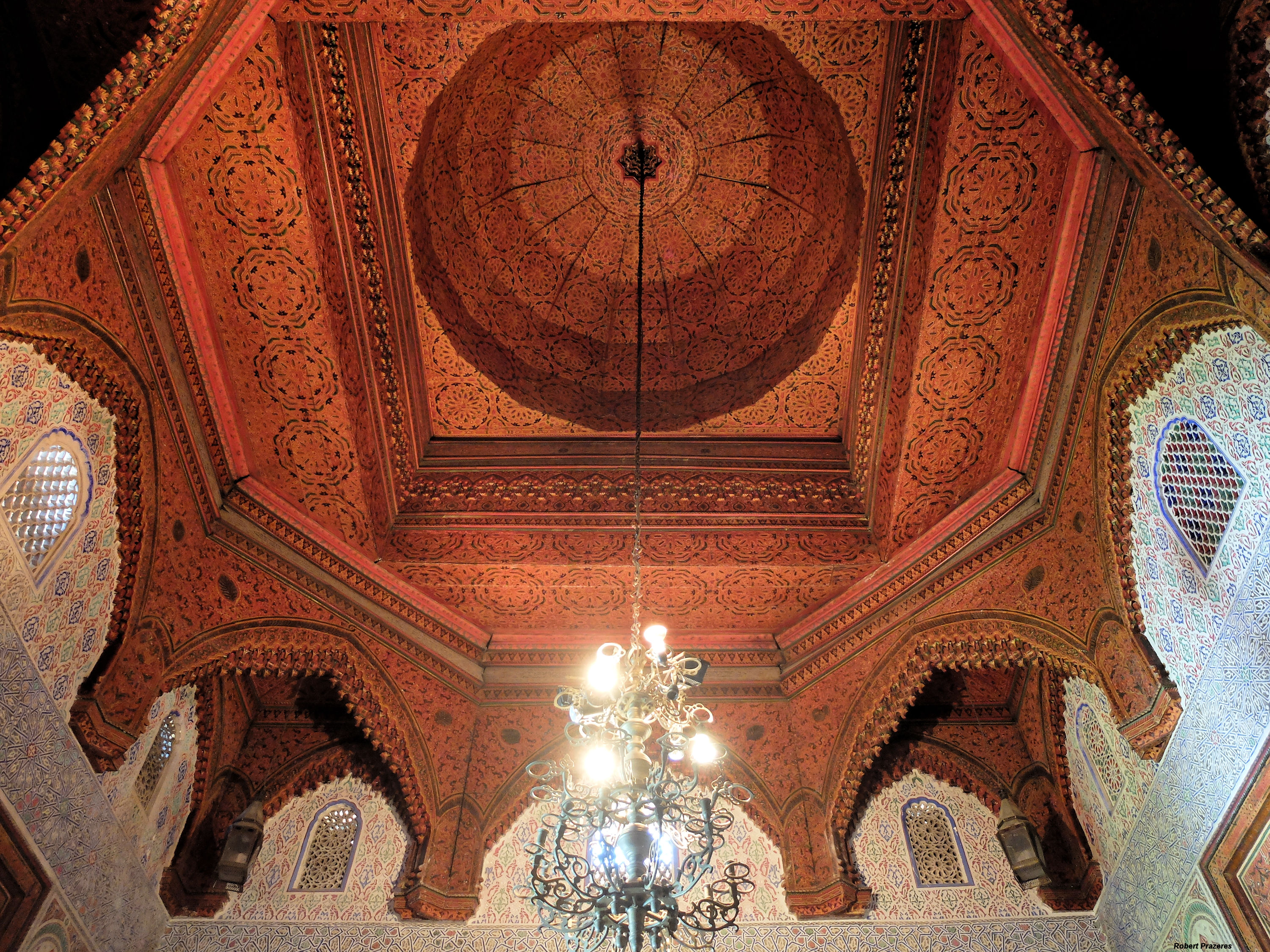
The wooden cupola above the restored upstairs salon

== Museum collection ==
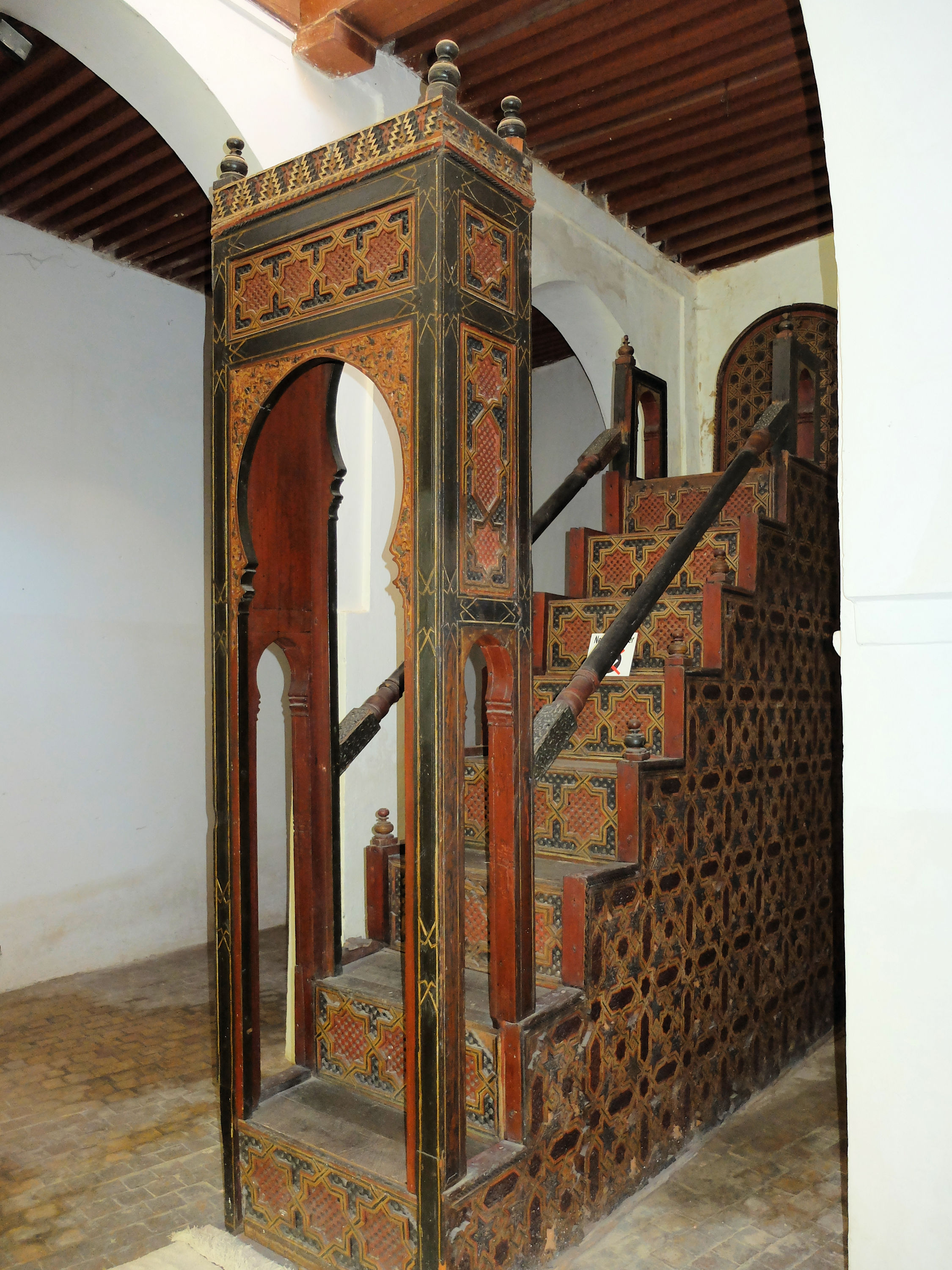
The late 17th-century minbar of the Lalla Aouda Mosque, on display at the museum

The museum holds a variety of artifacts from Meknes and the surrounding region, including ceramics, wooden objects, embroidery, carpets, and jewellery. Most objects date from the 19th and 20th centuries, but some older objects date from the reign of Moulay Isma'il or earlier. Among the latter are the wooden minbar and maqsura of the Lalla Aouda Mosque, dating from the late 17th century when Moulay Isma'il built the mosque.
