= Battle of Martos =

Minor battle in the reconquista

- Part of the Spanish Reconquista
- The Nasrid Kingdom of Granada
Date	21 October 1275
Location	Torredonjimeno, Spain
Result	Moorish victory

Belligerents
Crown of Castile	Marinid sultanate Kingdom of Granada

Commanders and leaders
Sancho of Aragon, Archbishop of Toledo †	Abenjor Atalì; Uzmén

Strength
(Unknown)	(Unknown)

Casualties and losses
(Very large)	(Unknown)

The Battle of Martos was a minor battle of the Spanish Reconquista fought between Martos and Torredonjimeno in Andalusia in 1275. The battle was fought between the troops of the Kingdom of Granada and those of the Crown of Castile. The Castilian force was completely destroyed as a result of the battle. There is some confusion in the dates since different authors report different dates. Zurita, for example, reports that the events described here took place between May and August; the more modern authors, however, put them between September and October.

== Historical context ==
In the early 1270s the Nasrid Kingdom of Granada used to pay parias to the powerful Christian Crown of Castile. In 1273 King Alfonso X of Castile raised the tribute to the huge sum of 300,000 maravedis and this was deemed unacceptable by King Muhammad II of Granada, who resolved to ask for help to the Marinid, Abu Yusuf Yaqub ibn Abd Al-Haqq. This one took immediately the opportunity and in summer 1275 crossed the Gibraltar strait with a large army which, together with the Granadine troops, attacked the Castilian territory. King Alfonso X at the time was away from Spain and his son and heir, infante Ferdinand, was regent of the kingdom. Ferdinand rushed to raise troops but unexpectedly died in Villa Real (August 1275). The country was leaderless and the Moors had the upper hand in the south. In September the adelantado mayor de Andalucia, Nuño González de Lara, tried to stop them but was defeated and killed in the battle of Écija. The young Archbishop of Toledo, infante Sancho of Aragon, put himself at the head of a force of knights from Toledo, Madrid, Guadalajara and Talavera and marched south to intercept the invaders. Another relief force was marching towards Jaén under Lope Díaz de Haro.

== Battle ==
The Castilian were staying in Torre del Campo when Archbishop Sancho received news from Fra' Alfonso Garcia, Commendator of Martos of the Order of Calatrava, that a Moorish force was close full of booty and Christian prisoners. He was advised by his own men to wait to be reached by the forces of Lope Diaz de Haro before attacking but the headstrong young Sancho resolved to attack immediately nonetheless. The fight probably took place near Torredonjimeno. The outnumbered Castilians were cut to pieces and few knights succeeded to escape, most being killed or taken prisoners. The Archbishop Sancho met a very ugly death. He was taken prisoner but, being recognized as a hostage of great importance (he was the son of King James I of Aragon), Granadine and Marinids officials started to argue about whom he belonged to. In order to cut short the dispute the Granadine arraez (governor) of Málaga killed the infante, beheaded him and cut his hand with the episcopal rings. The head was given to the Marinids and the hand to the Granadines.

== Aftermath ==
Lope Diaz de Haro succeeded to recover the archbishop's body but did not chase the Moors. Later on Castile was relieved by the second son of King Alfonso X, infante Sancho, who came back from France and took the lead, organizing a swift defense of the southern territory. Aragon attacked Granada in the south-east. Sultan Abu Yusuf Yaqub ibn Abd Al-Haqq at this point went back to Magreb and a truce between Castile and Granada went into place "de facto". These events were the beginnings of the so-called Battle of the Strait between Castile and the Moroccans which lasted into the 1350s.

== Bibliography ==
- Abarca, Pedro (1682). Los Reyes de Aragón en anales históricos, Primera parte. Imprenta Imperial, Madrid.
- Ladero Queisada, Miguel Ángel (1989). Granada. Historia de un país islámico. Editorial Gredos, Madrid.
- Suárez Fernández, Luis (1975). Historia de España Antigua y Media (2 vols.). Ediciones Rialp, Madrid.
- Zurita, Jerónimo (1562–1580). Anales de Aragón (PDF) (1ª ed.). Institución Fernando el Católico, Zaragoza, 2005.
