= Oum el-Iman bint Ali el-Bethary =

Wife of the Moroccan Marinid Emir Abd al-Haqq I

Oum el-Youmn bint Ali Mahli el-Bettuyi أم اليمن بنت علي محلي البطوئي
- Spouse: Abd al-Haqq I
- Issue: Abu Yusuf Yaqub ibn Abd al-Haqq
- House: Marinid (by marriage)
- Father: Ali Mahli el-Bettuyi
- Religion: Islam

Oum el-Youmn bint Ali Mahli el-Bettuyi (Arabic: أم اليمن بنت علي محلي البطوئي) also known as Oum el-Youmn bint Mahalli was the wife of the Moroccan Emir of the Marinid Sultanate Abd al-Haqq I and the mother of Abu Yusuf Yaqub ibn Abd al-Haqq. She was from the Zenata group of tribes and is considered a walia (saint) in Morocco.

== Biography ==
She was the daughter of Ali Mahli el-Bettuyi. Her family came from the Mahalli branch of the Boutouïa which was one of the main families of the Boutouïa tribe who had been confederates and allies of the Marinid family of Hammamma-Ibn-Mohammed.

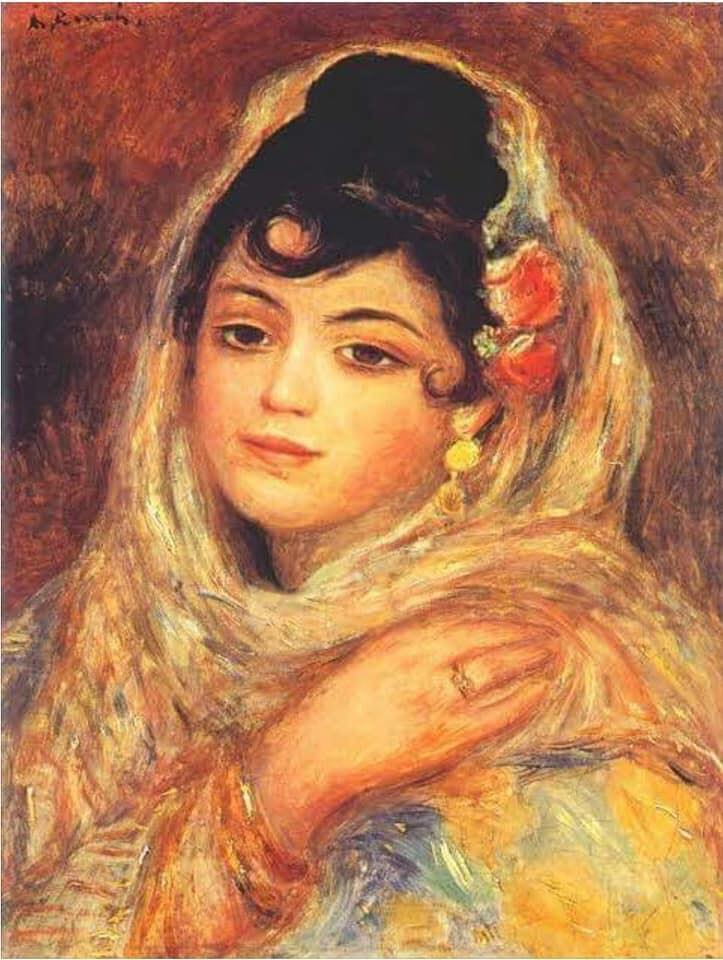
Illustration of Oum El-Youmn

When she was a young girl, she had a dream of the moon rising from her bosom and ascending to the sky, from where it shed its light over all the earth. She immediately told this dream to her father who hastened to go to Sheikh Abu Othman el-Ouaragly. He replied: “If you are telling the truth, this young girl’s dream means that she will give birth to a great king, a righteous saint, who will cover his subjects with benefits and prosperity”. The son of Oum el-Iman, Emir Abu Yusuf Yaqub ibn Abd al-Haqq, would indeed become a very successful and highly regarded Moroccan sultan.

Around 1210, she married the emir Abu Mohammed Abd al-Haqq. During the marriage ceremony, her father said to his future son-in-law: “My daughter is blessed, and she will make you happy by giving you a son who will be a great king who will cover your nation with glory until the last centuries”. The couple had at least one child, the emir Abu Yusuf Yaqub who was born between 1210 and 1212. All the relatives of Oum el-Iman enjoyed high favour with her son Sultan Abu Yusuf Yaqub, because of the affinity that existed between them and him, and because of the great influence they exercised in their tribe.

A woman of great piety, Oum el-Youmn made the pilgrimage to Mecca (the Hajj) in the year 643 AH (1245-6) and returned to the Maghreb in the year 647. Five years later, she left for the east a second time and made a pilgrimage of supererogation (Umra). After returning home, she died in Cairo the following year.

== Tomb ==
The grave of "Lalla Mimouna", Oum el-Youmn, is located at Busekkur in the tribe of the Ibeqquyen (Central Rif).

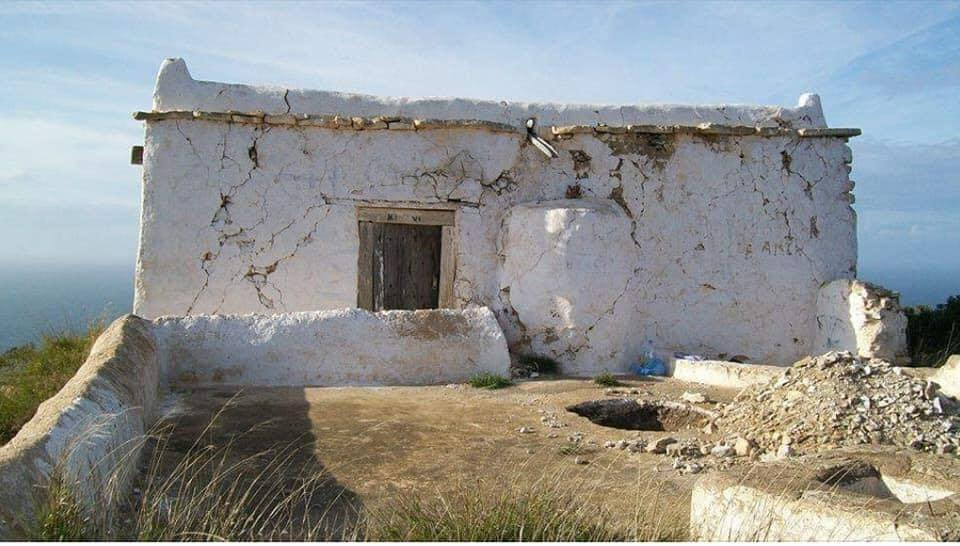
the tomb of Oum El-Youmn
