= Siege of Jerez (1285) =

The siege of Jerez by the Marinid sultan Abū Yūsuf lasted from May until late summer or early autumn 1285.

The Marinids crossed the sea from Ksar es-Seghir in Morocco to Tarifa in Spain on 12 April 1285. This was the fifth Marinid invasion of Castile. They first assaulted Jerez on 5 May and again on 22 May. From 31 May, Jerez was assaulted daily. The most detailed account of the siege comes from the Rawḍ al-Qirṭās, which describes the siege camp as "like a city where all sorts of craftsmen and merchants gathered".

King Sancho IV mustered an army at Seville to relieve Jerez. After he had gathered some 4,000 knights but before the hermandades (town militias) had arrived, he informed Abū Yūsuf of his intention to meet him in battle in five days. Although the Marinid besiegers had over 18,000 men, its supplies were low. On 2 August, according to the Rawḍ al-Qirṭās, Abū Yūsuf lifted the siege and retreated. Ibn Khaldūn, however, places the retreat in late September, while Jofré de Loaisa puts it in October.

== Works cited ==
- O'Callaghan, Joseph F. (2011). The Gibraltar Crusade: Castile and the Battle for the Strait. Philadelphia: University of Pennsylvania Press.
