= Bab Mansur al-'Alj =

Gate in Meknes, Morocco

Coordinates: 33°53′33.4″N 5°33′52.5″W

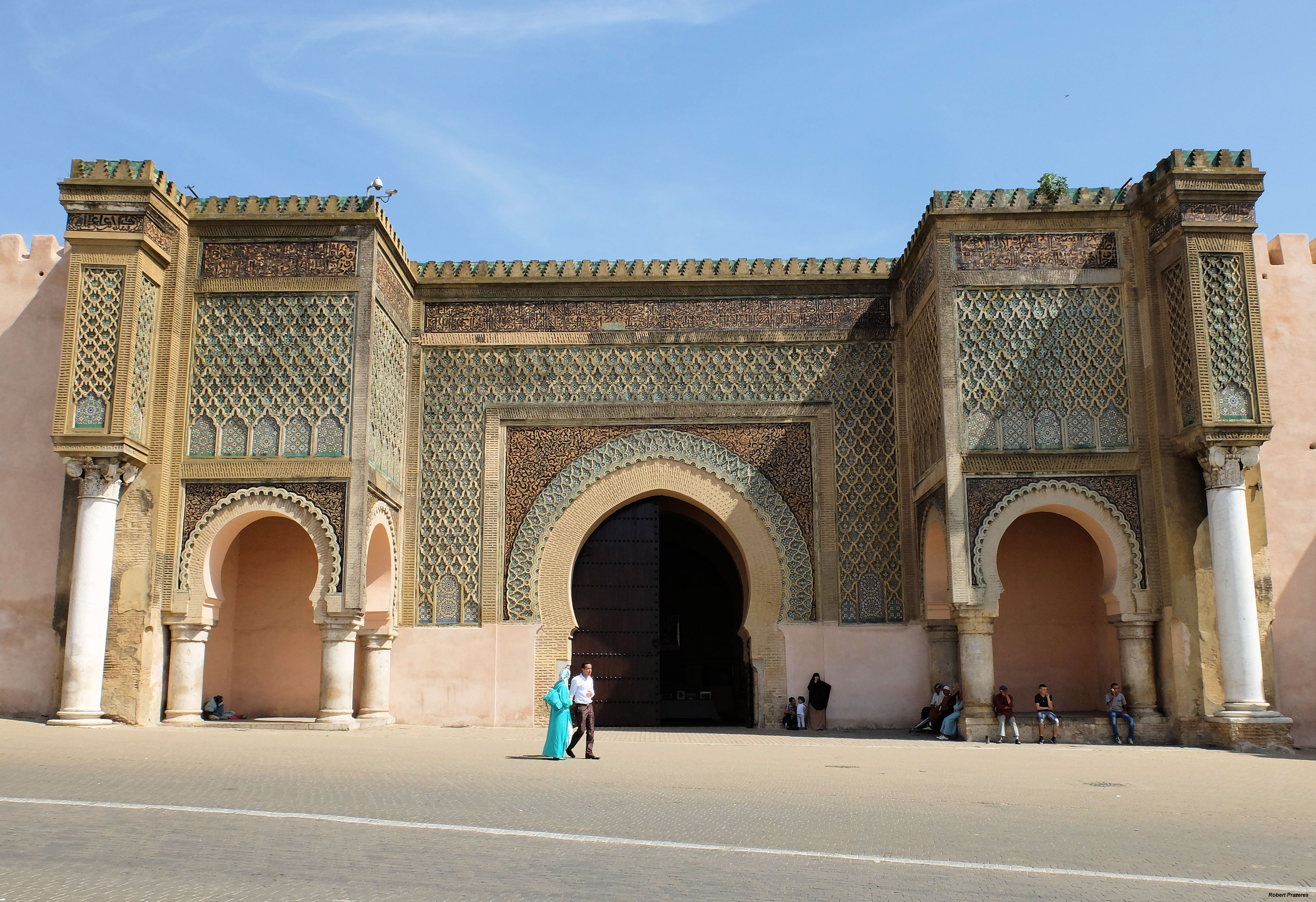
The facade of Bab Mansour gate

Bab Mansur al-'Alj or Bab Mansour (Arabic: باب المنصور لعلج) (also variously spelled as Bab Mansour al-'Ilj, Bab Mansour al-Eulj, Bab el-Mansour, Bab Mansur, etc.) is a monumental gate in the city of Meknes, Morocco. Located on the south side of Place el-Hedim (el-Hedim Square) in the old city, it was originally the main ceremonial entrance to the Kasbah (royal citadel) of Sultan Moulay Isma'il, built in the late 17th and early 18th centuries. Today it is one of the most famous and admired landmarks in the city.

== History ==
Begun in the later years of Moulay Isma'il's reign, the gate was finished in 1732 by his son Moulay Abdallah. The gate's purpose was more ceremonial than defensive, aiming to impress visitors. Its name comes from the architect and designer of the gate, Mansour al-'Alj (the "Victorious Apostate"), a former Christian slave who converted to Islam. Another ornate gate, Bab Jama' en-Nouar, also stands a short distance to the southwest along the same wall. It has similar decoration to the larger Bab Mansour and is believed to also date from the time of Moulay Isma'il.

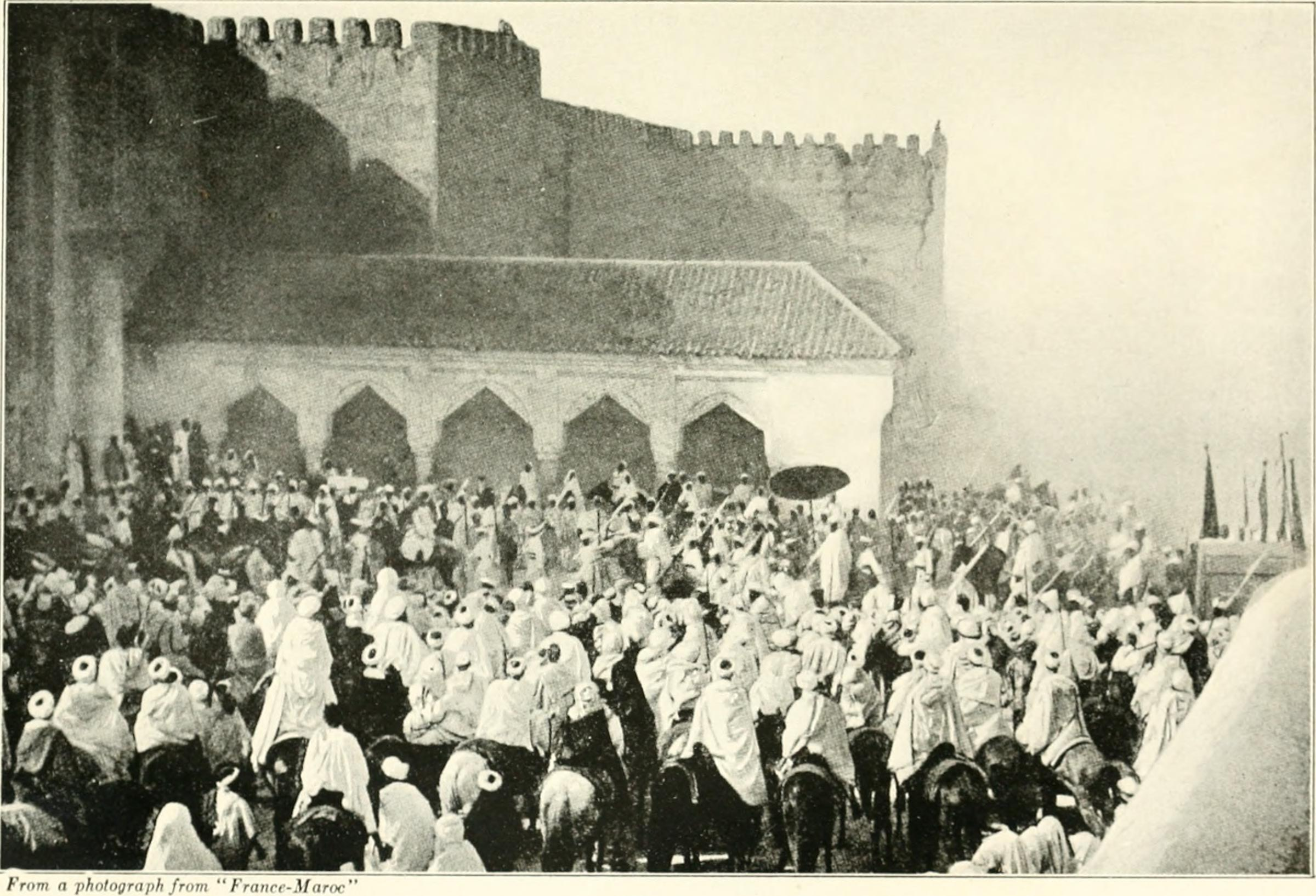
Royal ceremony taking place in front of Bab Mansour in 1920, with Moulay Abd ar-Rahman's 19th-century loggia visible in the back

In the early 19th century, Sultan Moulay Abd ar-Rahman added a loggia-type structure just outside the gate on the right (southwest side), which is no longer present today. The structure served as a meeting place for military and high-ranking officials, as well as the tribunal of the city's governor, and for holding various military or religious ceremonies. Today the gate is usually closed but its interior is sometimes open to host exhibits.

== Architecture ==
The overall design of the gate is based on Almohad prototypes (such as Bab Agnaou and the gate of the Kasbah of the Udayas), with a large horseshoe-arch opening and flanking bastions, but also presents significant new features. In particular, the flanking square bastions or towers are supported on four thick squat columns at the corners with horseshoe arches between them, creating a hollow loggia at the base of the towers. Further out to the sides, flanking the bastions, are massive marble columns supporting large projecting pilasters above. The columns, with ornate composite order capitals, are of ancient Roman origin, probably from the nearby site of Volubilis. Inside, the gate's passage is bent, turning 90 degrees twice, and bridges the distance between the double walls of the Kasbah, granting access to Place Lalla Aouda beyond.

Almost the entire facade of the gate, including the flanking bastions, is covered in heavy decoration. This consists of a repeating darj-wa-ktaf motif (stylized lozenge-like pattern in Moroccan architecture) which frames the main archway of the gate and fills the spaces above the columns of the flanking bastions. The empty or negative spaces within this motif are entirely filled with colourful polychrome zellij (mosaic tilework), another feature which was new to Moroccan monumental gateways. The spandrels of the arches are filled with arabesque-painted tiles. At the very top of the gate, above the other decoration and running along its entire length, is an elaborate Arabic inscription painted on tiles which describes the construction of the gate, which in turn was topped by small "saw-tooth" merlons.

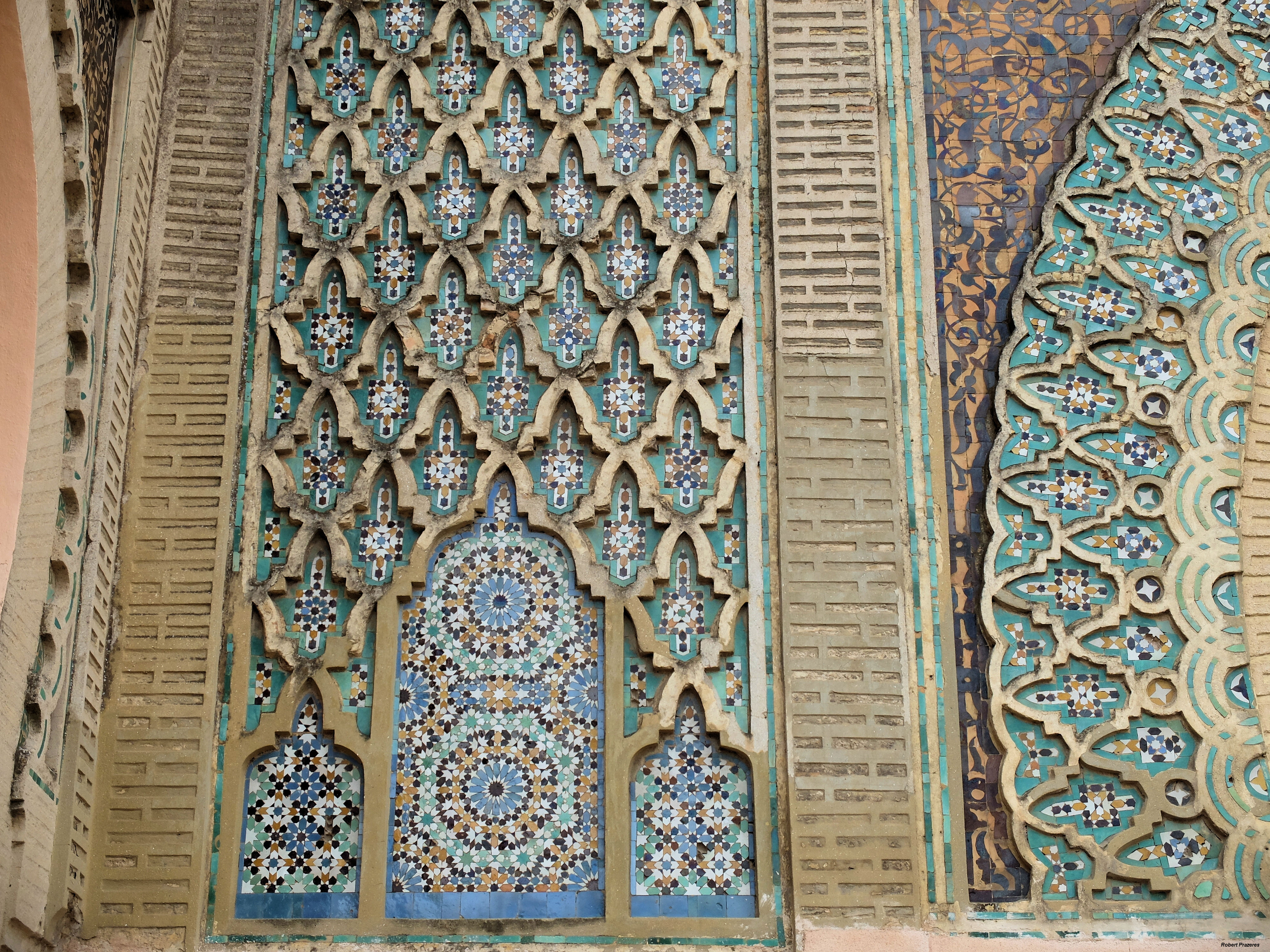
Detail of the darj-wa-ktaf and zellij decoration of the gate

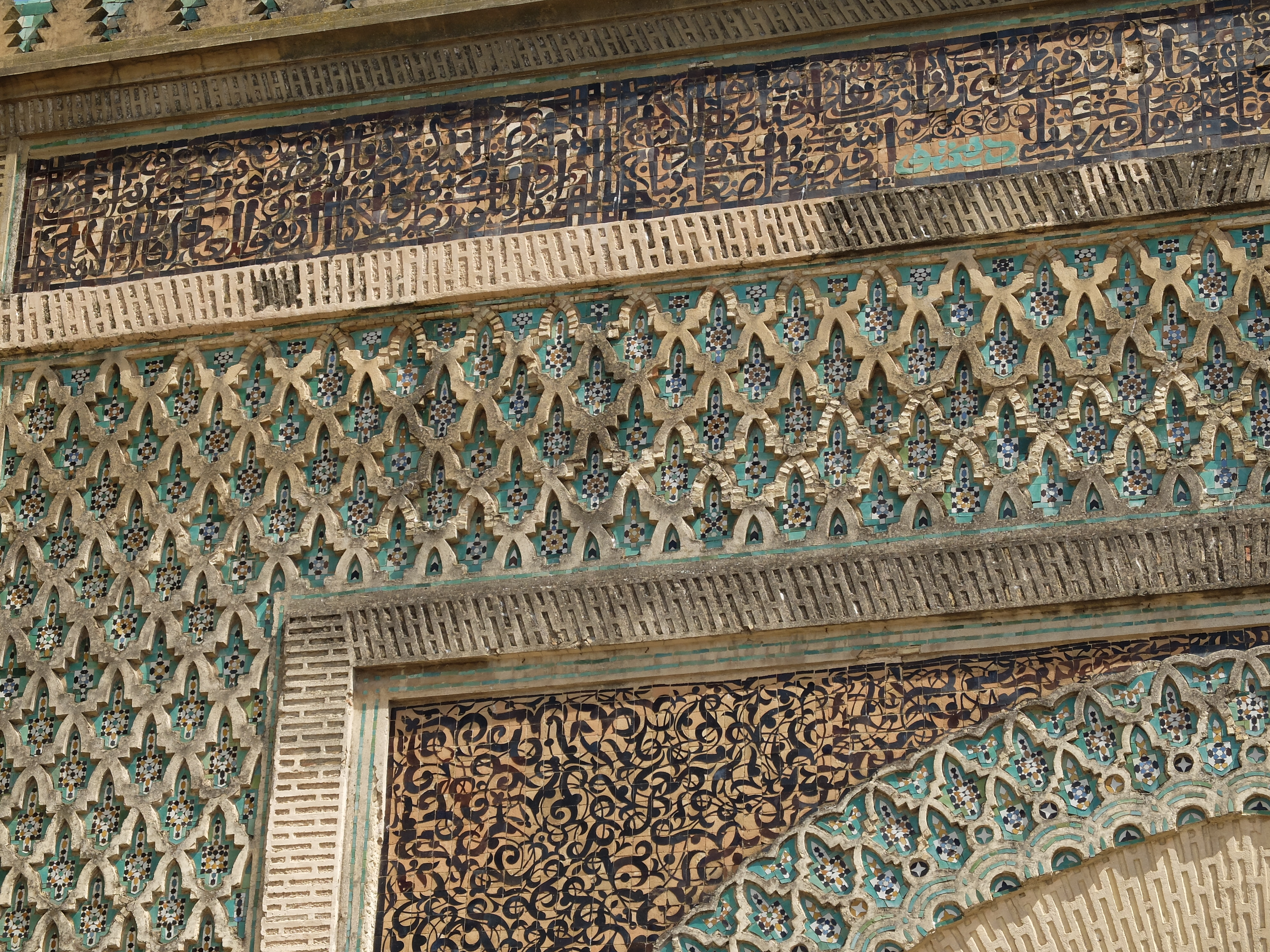
The Arabic inscription running along the top of the gate, with more darj wa ktaf and zellij decoration below

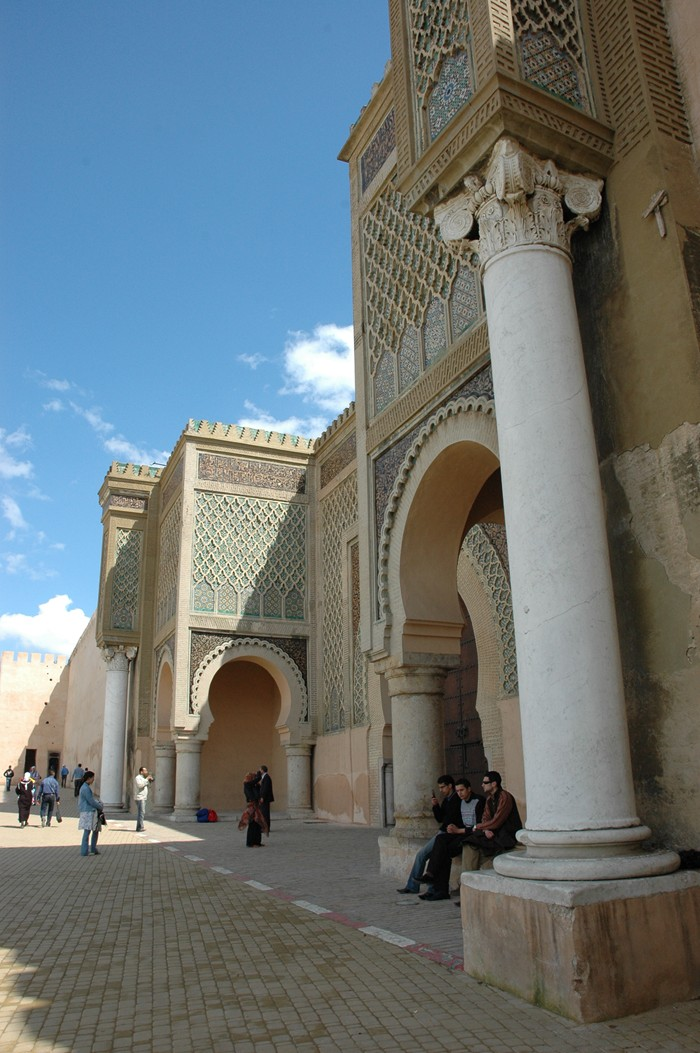
The pillars and columns of the gate

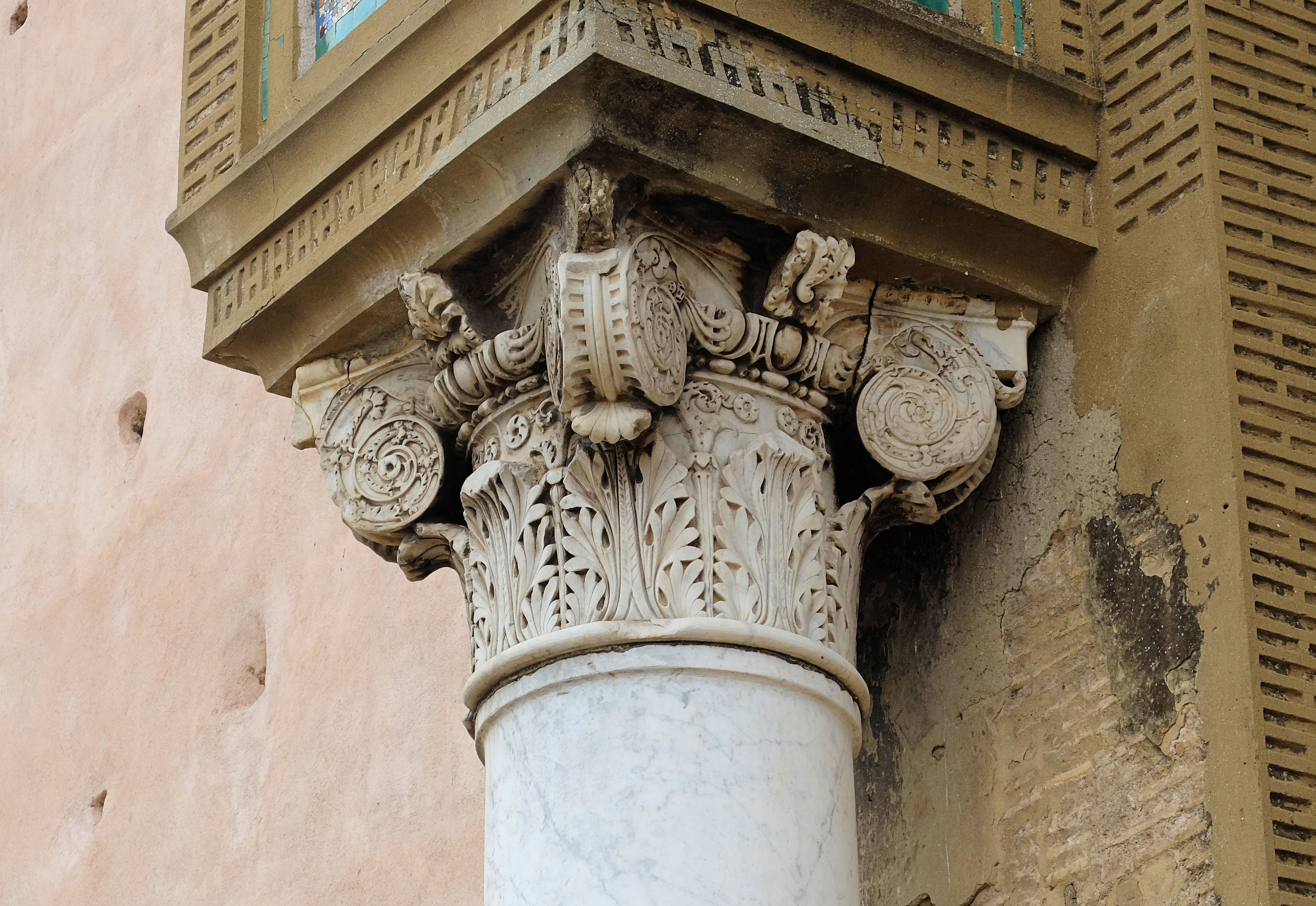
Ancient Roman spolia in the gate; a marble capital in composite style, possibly from Volubilis

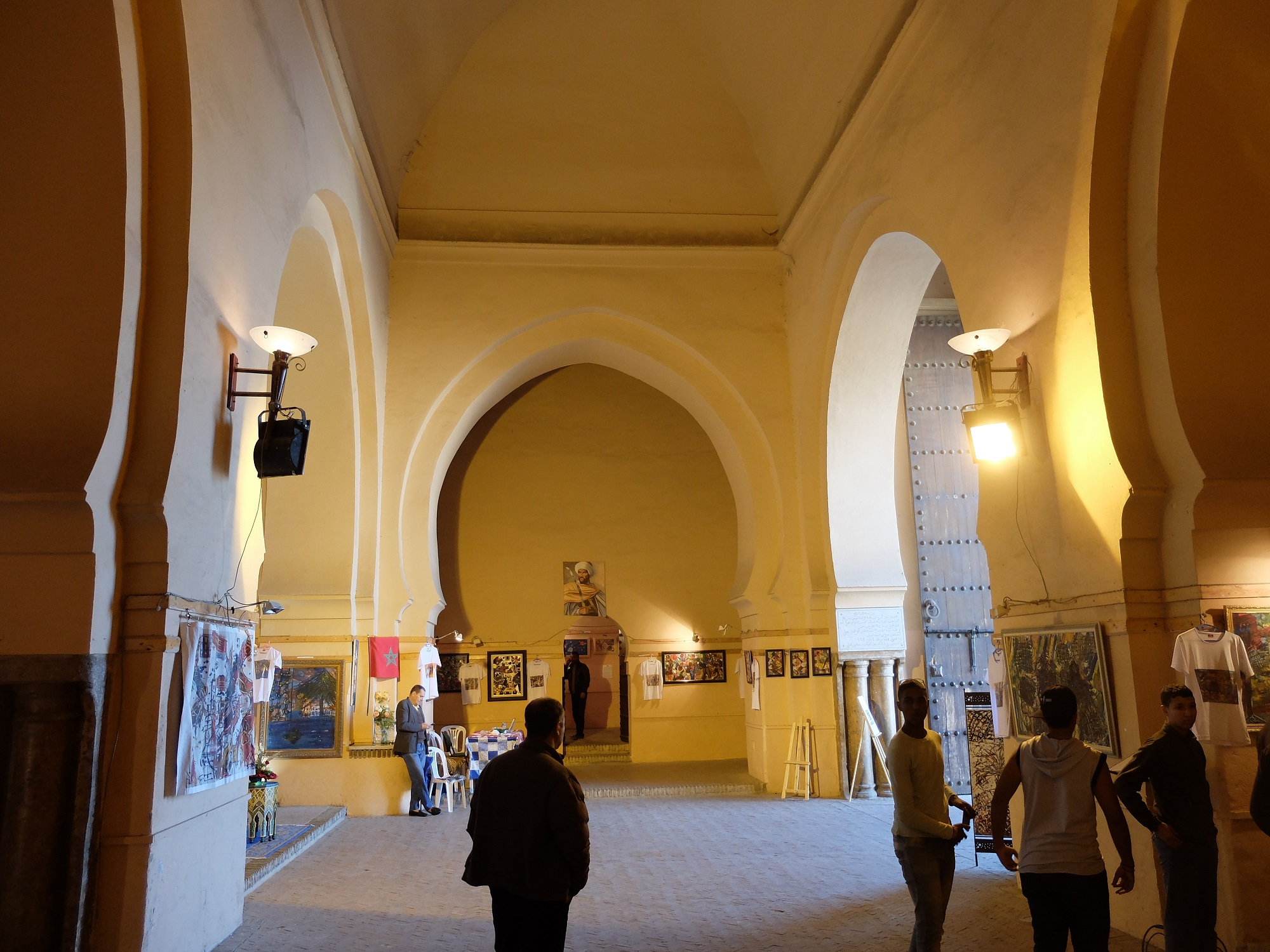
The interior of the gate

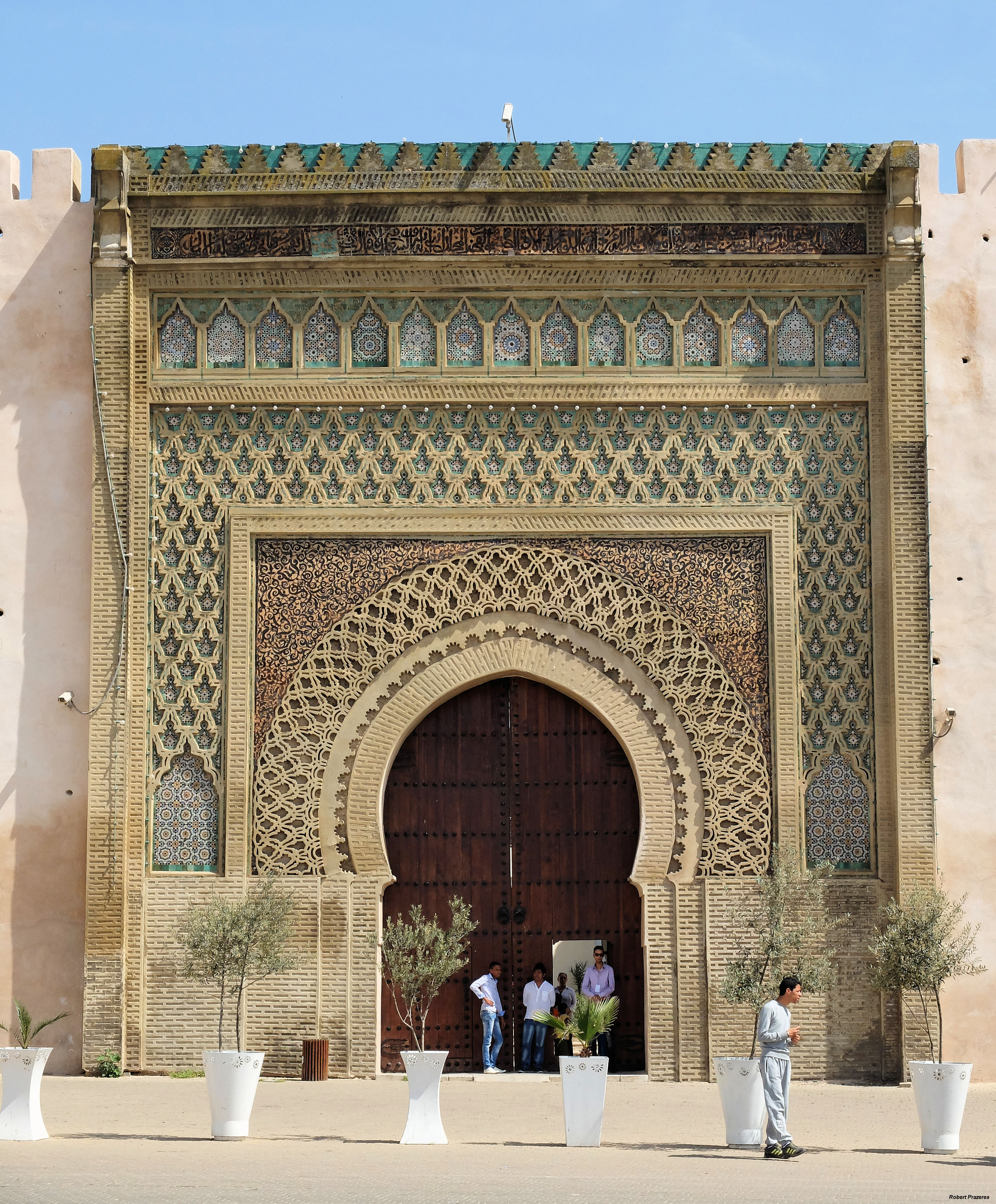
Bab Jama' en-Nouar, another gate just southwest of Bab al-Mansur

== See also ==
- Moroccan architecture
- Bab er-Rouah
- Lalla Aouda Mosque
