= Sancho of Aragon (archbishop of Toledo) =

Spanish Catholic archbishop (1250–1275)

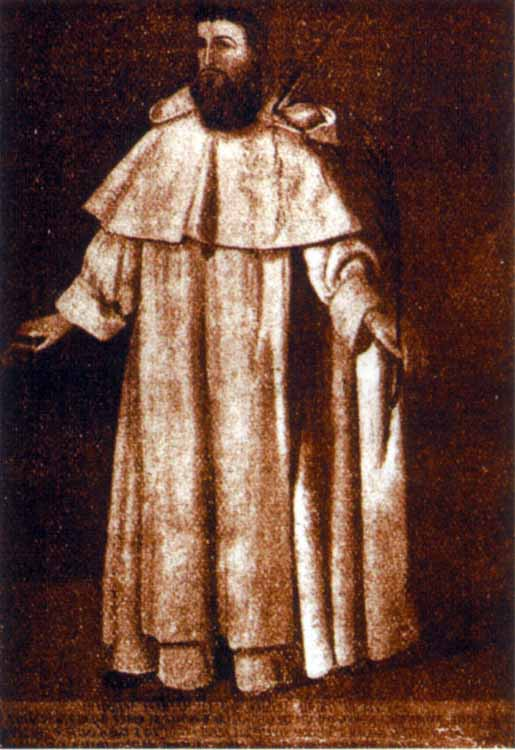
Blessed Sanctius of Aragon, Bishop of Toledo

Sancho of Aragon (1250 – Martos, 1275) was an Infante of Aragon and Archbishop of Toledo, who was killed by the Moors.

== Biography ==
Sancho was a son of James I of Aragon and his second wife Yolanda of Hungary. He joined the Order of the Blessed Virgin Mary of Mercy at a young age and had Peter Pascual as a tutor. He became Archbishop of Toledo in 1266, when he was only 16 years old.

In 1275 he raised some troops to engage Marinid armies that had attacked Andalusia. On 21 October 1275 he tried to intercept a numerically superior Marinid army in the battle of Martos but was defeated and taken prisoner. He was killed and beheaded.

His body was recovered and buried in the Toledo Cathedral. Because of his heroic death, he was venerated by the people as a martyr and considered Blessed.

== Sources ==
- Fernández Serrano, Francisco (October 1979). La muerte y el epitafio de don Sancho de Aragón, hijo de Jaime I, 1275 (in Spanish). ISBN 84-00-05009-6.
