= Great Mosque of Taza =

Historic mosque in Taza, Morocco

- الجامع الكبير
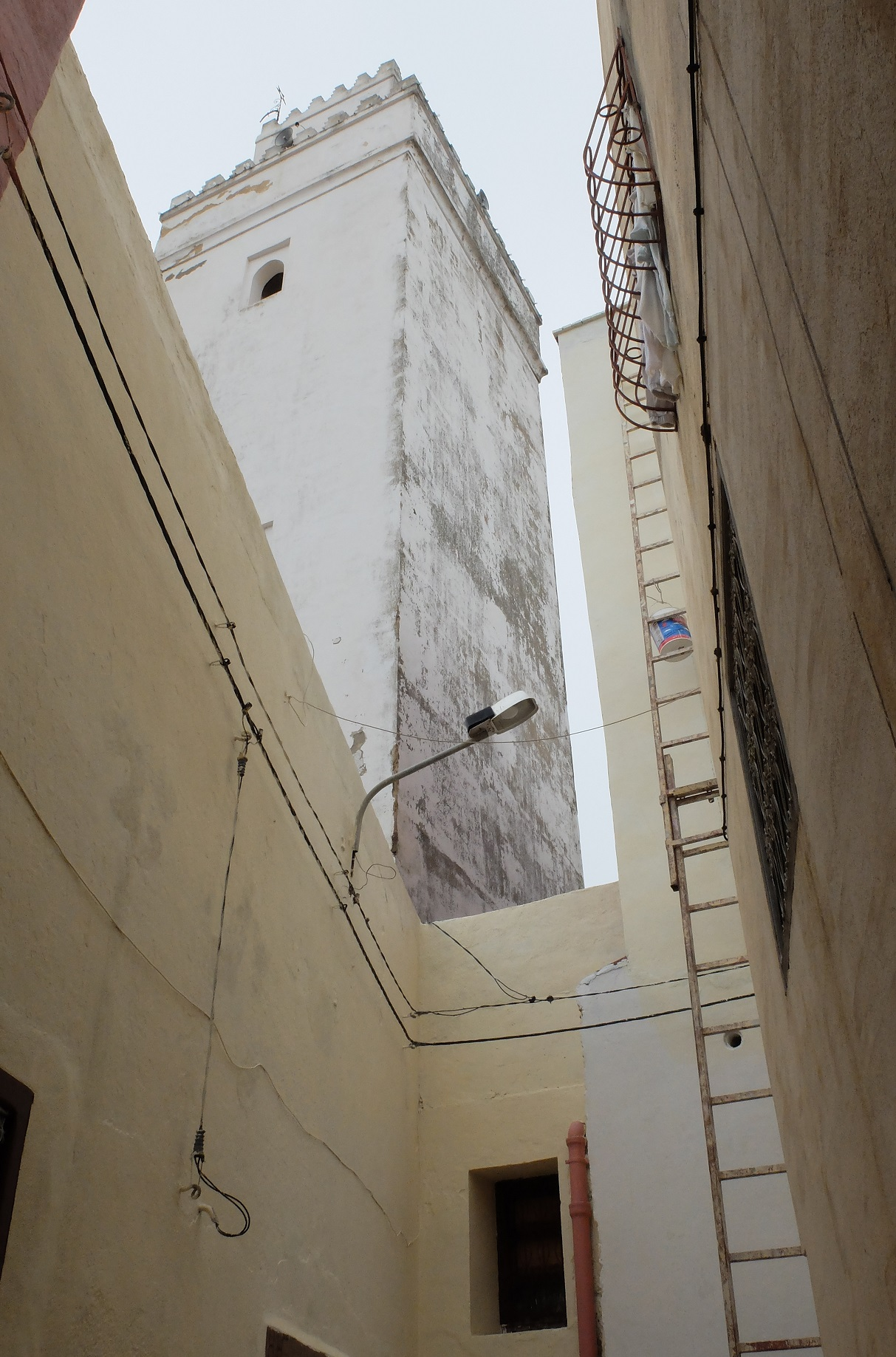
- The minaret of the mosque

Location
- Location: Taza, Morocco
- Interactive map of Great Mosque of Taza
- Coordinates: 34°12′45.53″N 4°01′07.34″W

Architecture
- Type: Mosque
- Style: Moorish (Almohad, Marinid)
- Founder: Abd al-Mu'min
- Established: circa 1142 CE

The Great Mosque of Taza (Arabic: الجامع الكبير, romanized: jama'a al-kabir) is the most important religious building in the historic medina of Taza, Morocco. Founded in the 12th century by the Almohad caliph Abd al-Mu'min, it is the oldest surviving example of Almohad architecture. It was expanded by the Marinids in the late 13th century and renovated by the 'Alawi sultan al-Rashid in the 17th century.

== History ==
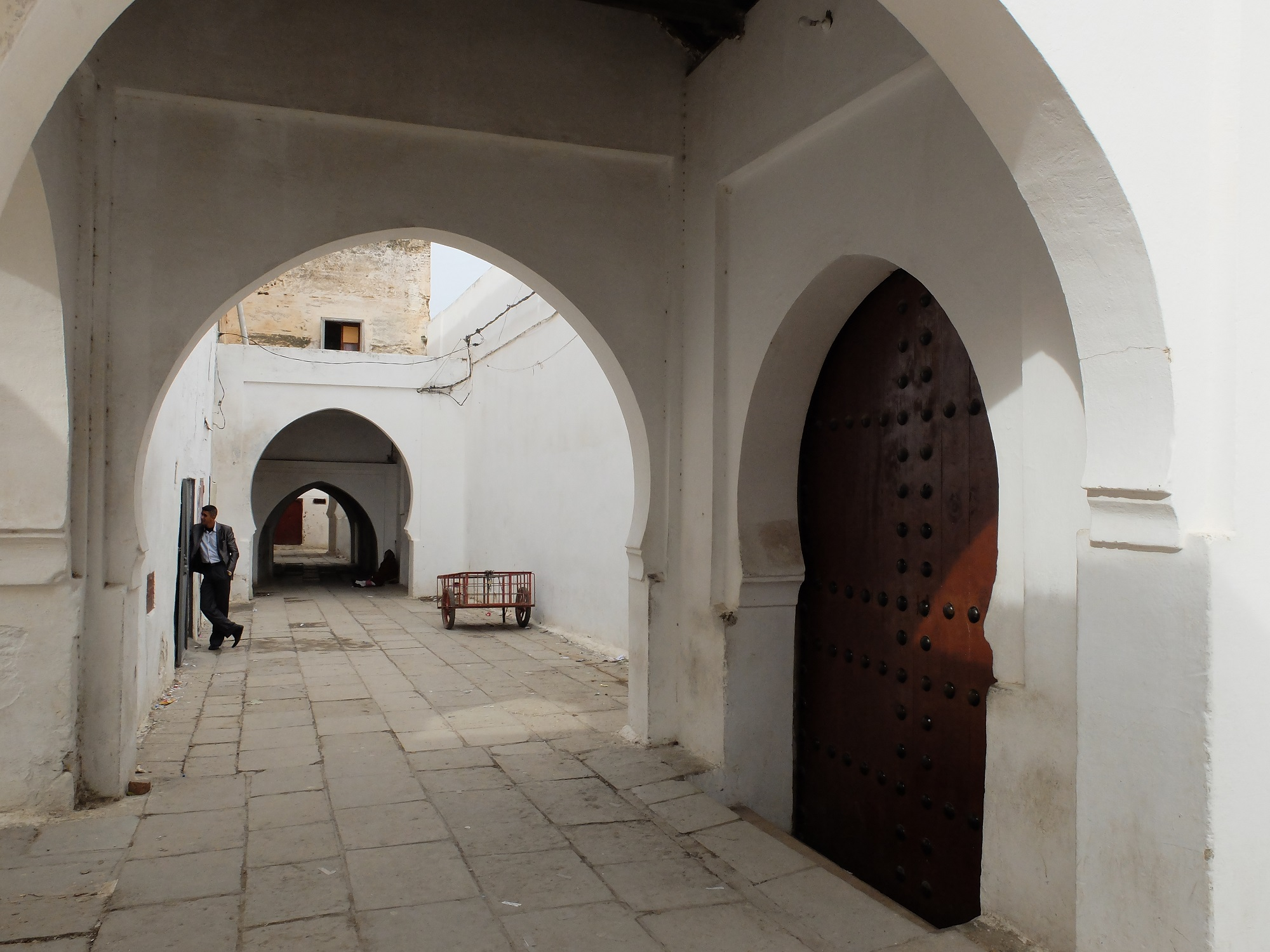
One of the street entrances to the mosque

The Great Mosque of Taza was built on the orders of the Almohad sultan Abd al-Mu'min in the period after 1142 CE, around the same time that he conquered the city. Taza, occupying a strategic location on the main road between Morocco and Algeria, was the first major city the Almohads conquered outside their initial mountain domains and served as one of their earliest bases after Tinmel. Their future capital of Marrakesh was only conquered 1147. Accordingly, the Great Mosque of Taza is the oldest surviving monument of Almohad architecture.

This original mosque had a nearly square floor plan measuring about 32 by 33 metres. Its prayer hall was wider than it was deep: it had either seven or nine naves running perpendicular to the qibla (southeastern) wall between rows of arches and four transverse aisles running parallel to the qibla wall. The last aisle, directly in front of the qibla wall, was distinguished by being slightly wider, as was the middle nave that led to the mihrab. This formed a "T" in the plan, which was a recurring feature in other medieval mosques in this region. Overall, the original Almohad layout of the mosque was highly similar to the layout of the Tinmal Mosque built by the Almohads soon afterwards.

The mosque was enlarged under the Marinid dynasty, during the reign of Abu Yaqub Yusuf. Work started in 1292 and ended in October the next year. (Or in 1294 according to Jonathan Bloom.) This expansion added two more side naves (one on the western edge and another on the eastern edge), making the mosque wider, and four more aisles to the south, making the prayer hall deeper. The "T" plan was replicated by making the last southern aisle larger. Abu al-Hasan, who built many madrasas across Morocco, also built a madrasa near the mosque here in Taza in 1324 (while he was still a governor during his father's reign), though today it is mostly ruined. Unusually, the Marinids also added a huge second courtyard (el-sahn el-kebir), almost as large as the entire mosque itself, on the mosque's east flank. The Marinid sultan Abu al-Rabi' was buried in this courtyard upon his death in 1310.

The mosque was only the object of patronage again after 1665, when the 'Alawi leader Moulay Rashid briefly made Taza his main base and built the Dar al-Makhzen (royal palace) in the south side of the old city. Moulay Rashid restored the mosque and added a southern gallery to the grand courtyard to serve as a "summer" mosque.

== Architecture ==
=== Overview ===
The mosque is the oldest remaining example of Almohad architecture. It is located near Bab er-Rih ("Gate of the winds"). The present-day mosque, which includes Marinid-era expansions, is composed of a main building and of a "grand courtyard" (el-sahn el-kebir) on its east side. Each of these parts has a rectangular floor plan measuring around 72 by 44 meters. The mosque has nine exterior gates.

=== Interior (prayer hall) ===
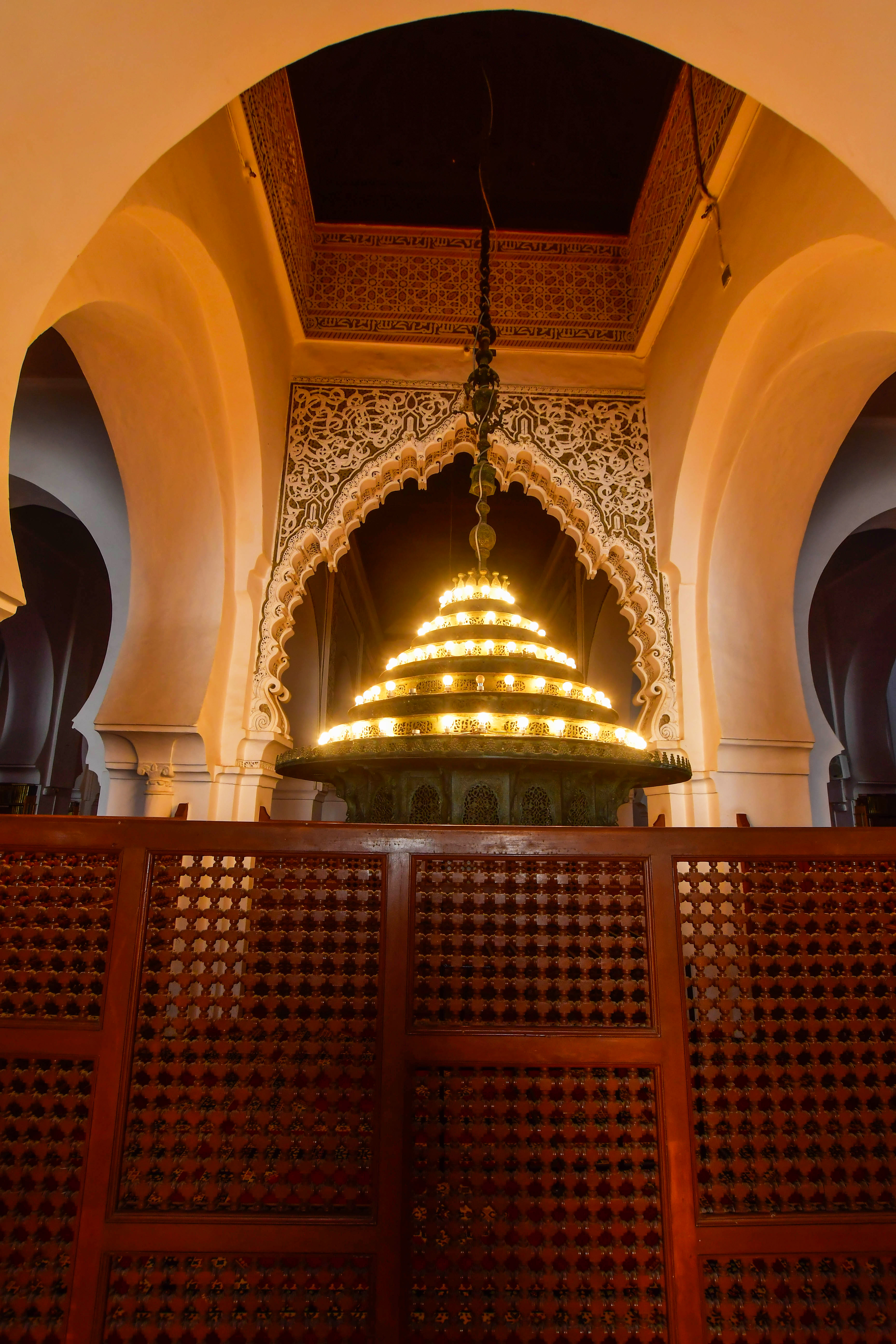
The interior of the mosque, with a view of the enormous 13th-century Marinid chandelier in the central nave, along with one of the "lambrequin"-style arches behind

The main building consists mostly of an interior prayer hall as well as a smaller courtyard (sahn) to the north which is enclosed by extensions of the prayer hall. The prayer hall is built in a hypostyle format and is divided into nine "naves" by rows of horseshoe arches running perpendicular to the southeastern qibla wall. The arches, in turn, form eight transverse aisles (running parallel to the qibla wall) south of the courtyard, or 14 aisles if counting the arches that run through the galleries on either side of the courtyard all the way to the northwestern wall.

The middle nave and the southernmost aisle are both wider than the others, forming a "T" shape in the layout of the mosque. This "T" plan is also highlighted by a series of decorative cupolas. The northern end of the central nave (at the entrance from the courtyard) is covered by a dome. In the fourth aisle of the mosque, about midway in the central nave, is a series of three vaulted cupolas which mark the spot where the former mihrab (wall niche symbolizing the qibla) of the mosque stood after its initial Almohad construction. This area is also marked by ornate lambrequin arches instead of the usual horseshoe arches and by some decorative engaged columns which likely once belonged to the mihrab decoration. At its southern end, the central nave leads finally to the mihrab, dating from the Marinid expansion. The mihrab, as in other Moroccan mosques, is the most richly decorated part of the mosque, with its surfaces covered in carved stucco ornamentation. The space in front of the mihrab is surrounded by lambrequin arches and is covered by an especially ornate dome that is similar to other examples in the Great Mosque of Tlemcen and the Great Mosque of Fes el-Jdid and is considered to be one of the finest of its kind. The dome is carved in stucco and is pierced to allow some external light to filter in, while its corners have four muqarnas-carved squinches. At both ends of the same aisle, at the southeastern and southwestern corners of the mosque, are two other vaulted cupolas. Behind the qibla wall, on the south side of the mosque, are several chambers and smaller annexes, including the imam's chamber, the minbar's storage chamber, a library, and a mida'a or ablutions chamber (Arabic: ميضأة).

=== Courtyard and minaret ===
The mosque's first courtyard occupies the center of the northern part of the building. It is flanked on its east and west sides by arcaded galleries where the two outer western and the two outer eastern naves extend as far as the northern edge of the courtyard. On the courtyard's north side are several other chambers of varying sizes which roughly correspond to the last two transversal aisles of the mosque building.

Near the courtyard's northeastern corner is the minaret tower, dating from the Almohad construction and thus the oldest surviving Almohad minaret. It has a square base and its height is five times greater than its width, which corresponds to the same proportions used in the more famous Almohad minarets like that of the Kutubiyya Mosque, although the secondary shaft in this minaret is slightly squatter than in the later examples. The minaret was decorated with blind arch motifs around its windows (which once provided light to the stairway inside), though much of this decoration is no longer evident today due to the later whitewashing of its surface.

=== Grand courtyard (el-sahn el-kebir) ===
The mosque's "grand courtyard" (el-sahn el-kebir) is a feature unique to this mosque and not found in any other historic mosque in Morocco. Located on the mosque's east side, it consists of an open courtyard that is almost as large as the main mosque building itself. It is planted with olive trees and has a fountain in its centre sheltered by a small domed kiosk (qubba). Along its western side is a narrow arcaded gallery that grants access between the courtyard and the mosque, while along its southern side is a deeper roofed gallery bordered by an arcade of pointed horseshoe arches. Behind this arcade, in the middle of the southern wall, is a mihrab, attesting to the area's use as an outdoor or "summer" mosque. The courtyard existed during the Marinid period, but the qubba fountain and the southern prayer gallery probably date from the time of Moulay Rashid (17th century) or later.

== Furnishings ==
=== Marinid chandelier ===
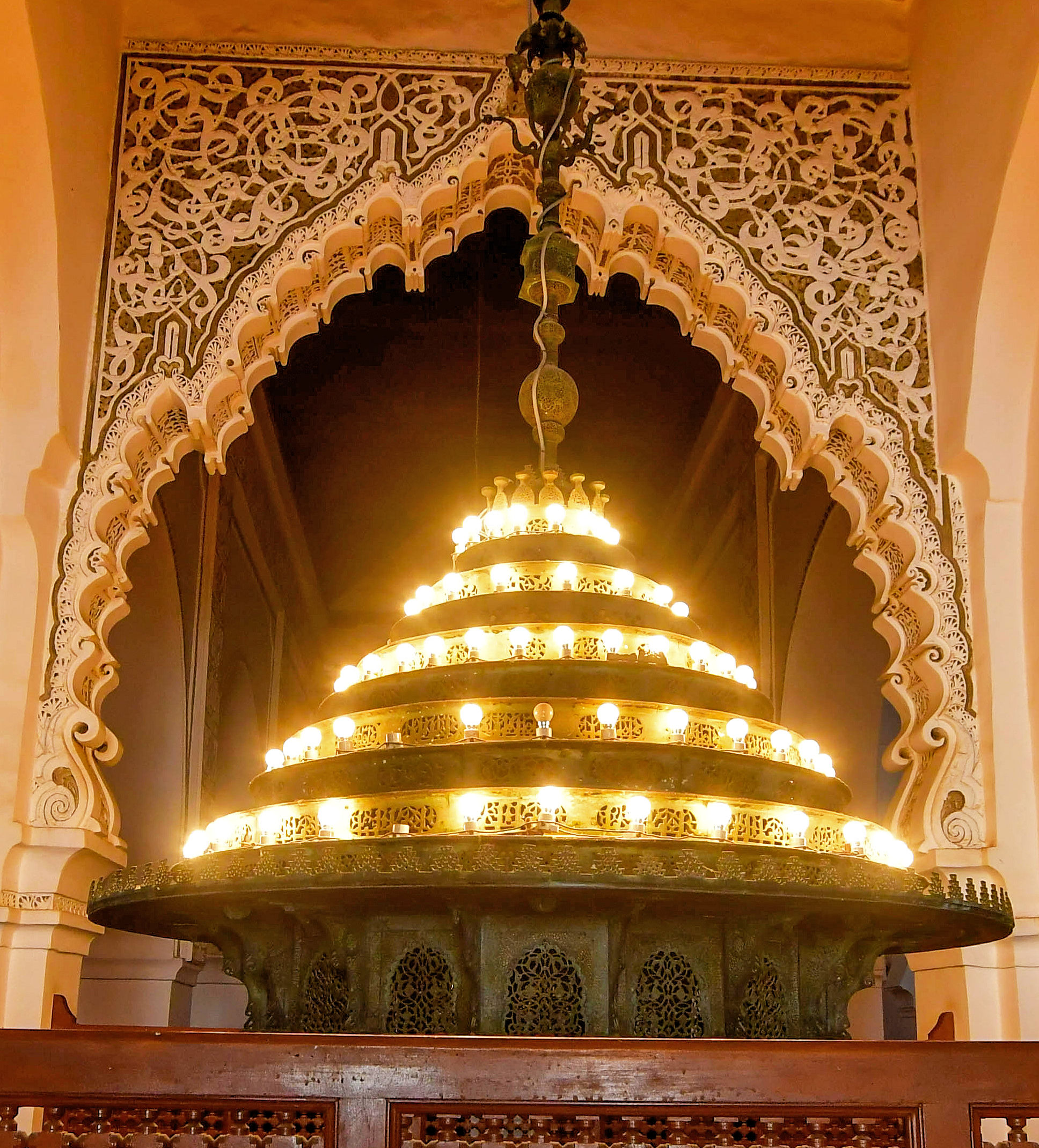
Partial view of the Marinid chandelier in the mosque

The mosque is also well-known for its enormous bronze chandelier, which dates from the Marinid era. According to the inscription carved on it, it was gifted to the mosque by Sultan Abu Yaqub Yusuf in 1294. With a maximum diameter of 2.5 meters and weighing 3 tons, it is the largest surviving example of its kind in North Africa. According to the Rawd al-Qirtas it cost 8000 dinars to make. It is composed of nine circular tiers arranged in an overall conical shape that could hold 514 glass oil lamps. Its decoration included mainly arabesque forms like floral patterns as well as a poetic inscription in cursive Arabic. This ornamentation was focused especially on the pole or shaft at the top of the cone and, especially, on the large dome-like underside which resembled the elaborate stucco dome in front of the mihrab. The decorative forms on this bronze chandelier were thus related, if not deliberately coordinated, with the decoration in other elements of the mosque during its Marinid expansion.

The chandelier's design was probably influenced by a similar great chandelier gifted to the Qarawiyyin Mosque in Fes in the early 13th century, during the Almohad period. Other chandeliers in the same style were created for other mosques in the Maghreb after this, including one still found in the Great Mosque of Fes el-Jdid, from the Marinid period, as well as a partially-preserved example from the Great Mosque of Tlemcen, perhaps originally crafted for the Marinid mosque of al-Mansura, now in a museum. Various other medieval lamps are also preserved in the Great Mosque of Taza, including one that used a church bell as its core, possibly a spoil brought back from Marinid campaigns in present-day Spain.

=== Minbar ===
The mosque's minbar (pulpit) is also dated to the end of the 13th century, during the Marinid expansion under Abu Yaqub Yusuf. Like other minbars, it takes the shape of a mobile staircase with an archway at the bottom of the stairs and a canopy at the top and it is composed of many pieces of wood assembled together. It is 3.25 meters high by 2.96 metres long, and 80 cm wide. It has been partly spoiled by later restorations which disfigured some of its original aspect, especially its upper elements and the archway at the base of the staircase. Nonetheless, it still preserves much of its original Marinid woodwork and demonstrates a close relation with other richly-crafted wooden minbars in Morocco following the tradition established by the 12th-century Almoravid minbar of the Kutubiyya Mosque. The most significant preserved elements are its two flanks, which are covered with an example of the elaborate geometric decoration found in this artisan tradition. This geometric motif is based on eight-pointed stars from which interlacing bands spread outward and repeat the motif across the whole surface. Contrary to the famous Almoravid minbar in Marrakesh, however, the empty spaces between the bands are not occupied by a mix of pieces with carved floral reliefs but are rather occupied entirely by pieces of marquetry mosaic decoration inlaid with ivory and precious woods.

=== Anaza ===
The mosque also features a historic anaza: a carved wooden screen at the entrance from the courtyard to the central nave of the prayer hall, which often acted as an "outdoor" mihrab for those performing their prayers in the courtyard. Although it is not unlikely that the mosque possessed such a feature since its Marinid expansion (as other Marinid mosques have the same feature), no visible evidence indicates the date at which the current anaza was crafted. Based on the style of the craftsmanship, it has been suggested that it is no older than the 17th century. Its courtyard-facing side is relatively plain and undecorated, but its interior-facing side is carved with various panels, including six blind arch motifs in its central section. A semi-circular tympanum above the middle is carved with a polygonal geometric pattern at the center of which is an Arabic inscription.

== See also ==
- Moroccan architecture
- Medina of Taza
- List of mosques in Morocco
- High medieval domes
