= Great Mosque of Tlemcen =

11th-century Almoravid-era mosque in northwestern Algeria

- المسجد الكبير
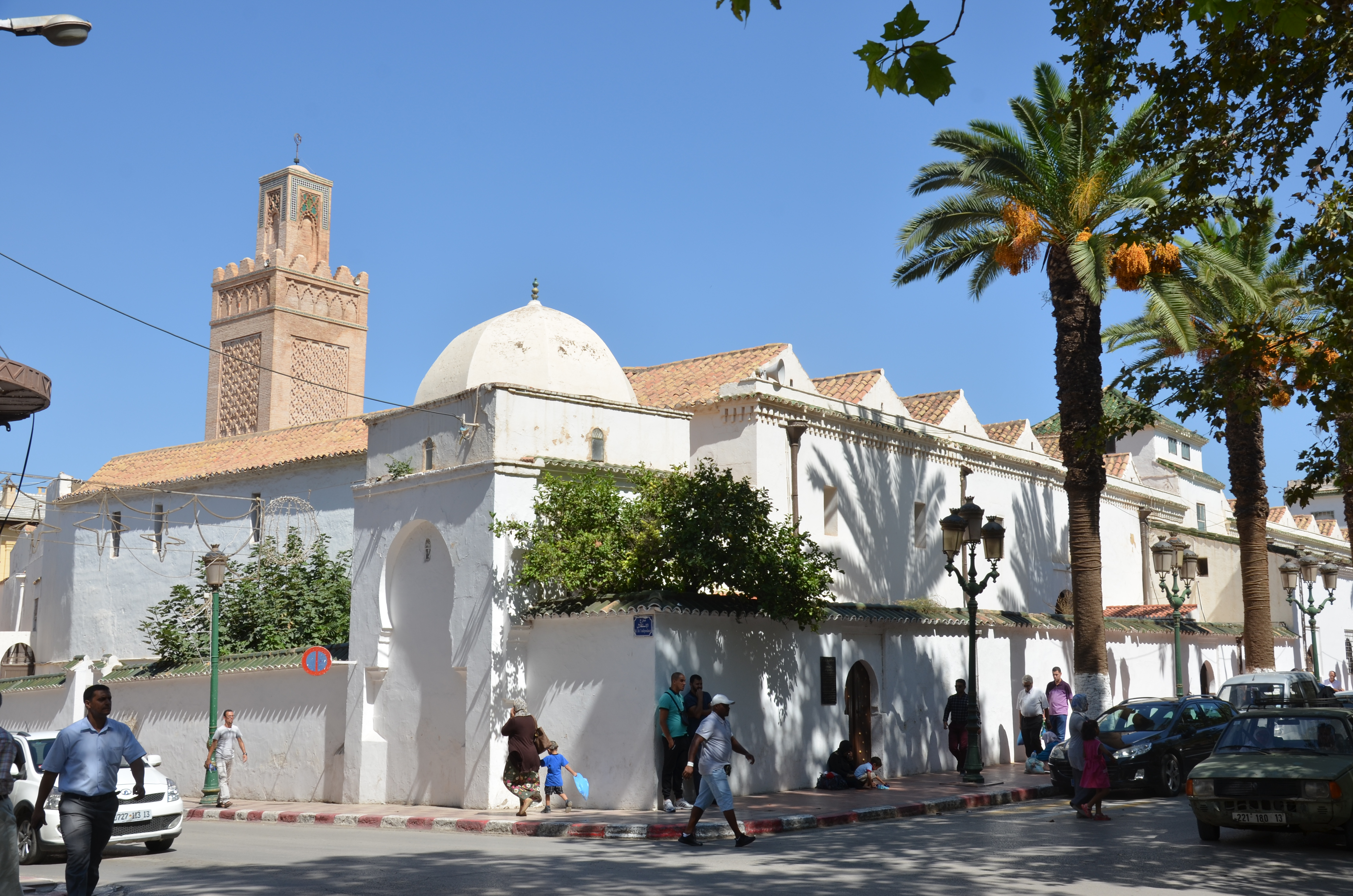

Religion
- Affiliation: Islam
- Ecclesiastical or organisational status: Mosque
- Status: Active

Location
- Location: Tlemcen
- Country: Algeria
- Interactive map of Great Mosque of Tlemcen
- Coordinates: 34°53′01″N 1°18′38″W

Architecture
- Style: Moorish (Almoravid, Zayyanid)
- Founder: Yusuf ibn Tashfin
- Completed: 1082; 1136 (decoration); 1236 (expansion)

Specifications
- Dome: 2
- Minaret: 1
- Minaret height: 29.15 m (95.6 ft)

The Great Mosque of Tlemcen (Arabic: الجامع الكبير لتلمسان, romanized: el-Jemaa el-Kebir litilimcen) is a mosque in Tlemcen, Algeria. It was founded and first built in 1082, and modified and embellished several times afterwards. It is considered one of the most important examples of architecture under the Almoravid dynasty. Major extensions to the mosque building and the construction of the minaret were completed during the Zayyanid era.

== History ==
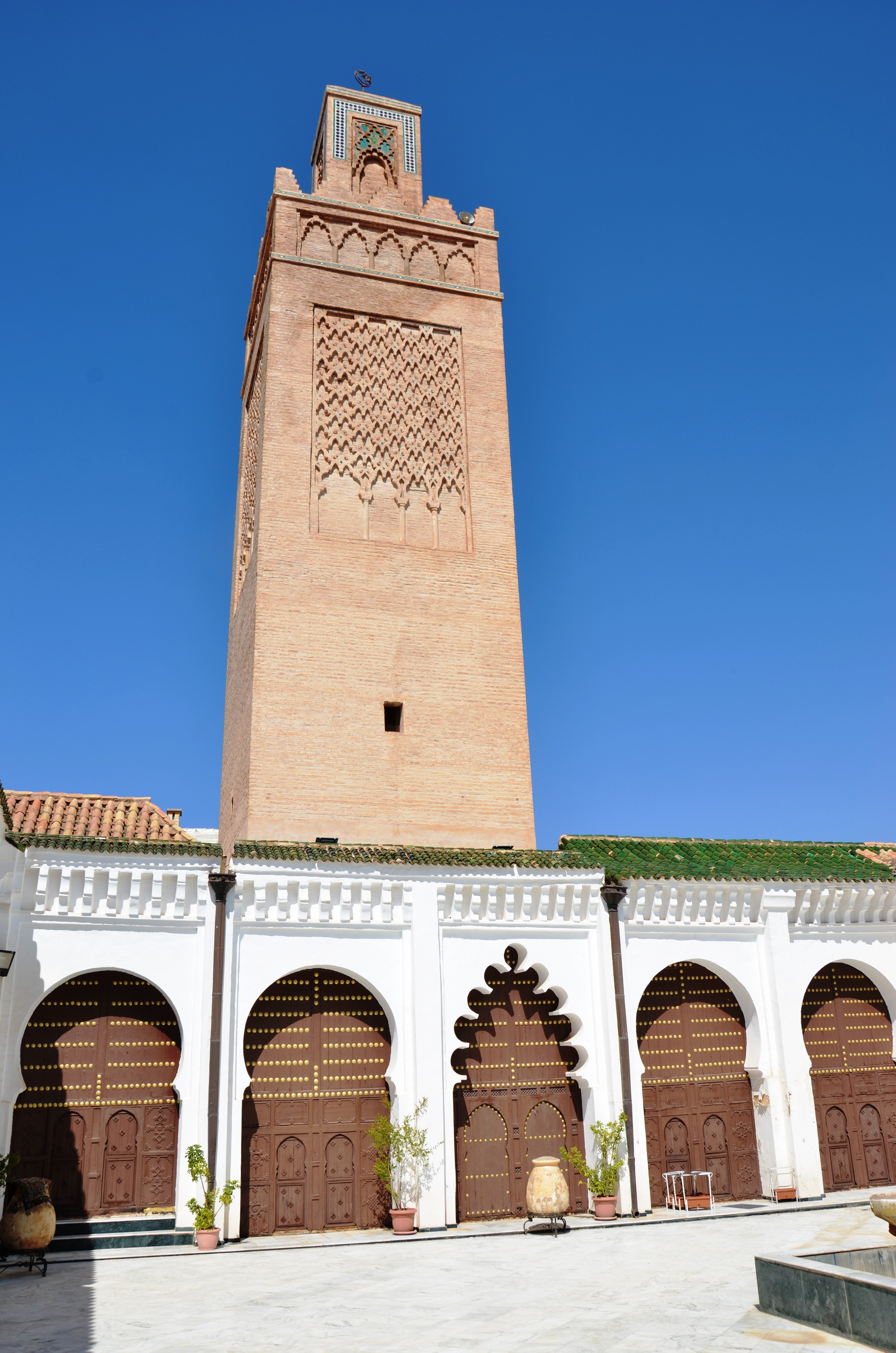
The minaret and courtyard of the mosque, dating from 1236

The mosque was founded by the Almoravid emir Yusuf ibn Tashfin in 1082 when he founded the city of Tagrart (present-day Tlemcen), an extension of the earlier Idrisid-era city of Agadir. However, the mosque was renovated and decorated by his son and successor, Ali ibn Yusuf. Among other things, the celebrated dome near the mosque's mihrab dates from this renovation, which an inscription below the dome indicates was completed in 1136. Curiously, however, the actual name of the emir has been erased from the inscription, possibly by the Almohads who ruled the city after the Almoravids. It is also believed that the old Almoravid palace of the city, the Qasr al-Qadima or Qasr al-Bali ("Old Palace"), directly adjoined the mosque on its northwestern side.

In 1236, Sultan Yaghmorasan (r. 1236–1283), the founder of the Abdalwadid dynasty of Tlemcen, added the mosque's minaret near its courtyard. Yaghmorasan also modified the areas around the courtyard and extended the mosque structure northwards. The original mosque likely had a larger rectangular courtyard whose position and proportions would have been similar to the courtyards of earlier mosques in Al-Andalus, whereas Yaghmorasan's modifications left the mosque with a square courtyard whose middle axis is no longer aligned with the middle axis of the mosque. The less ornate dome in the middle of the prayer hall today probably also dates from this time.

Next to the mosque there used to be an Islamic court (Mahkama) and an Islamic university. In 1875, during French colonial control, the mosque was declared, along with other major monuments of the city, a "Historic Monument" and placed under certain protective measures. Around the same time, French architects carried out the first modern repairs, restorations, and studies of the mosque.

== Architecture ==
View of the prayer hall, showing the horseshoe arches and the transverse polylobed arches, c. 1889. The large (partly damaged) chandelier, popularly attributed to Yaghmorasan, is also visible on the right.

The floor plan of the mosque is approximately 50 by 60 metres (160 by 200 feet) deep. Although the mosque is designed for a typical rectangular floor plan, the northwestern corner of the mosque is truncated because of the original presence of a palace on this side. Like most North African mosques, it has a hypostyle prayer hall and an internal courtyard (sahn).

The prayer hall is divided into 13 naves or aisles by 12 rows of horseshoe arches running perpendicular to the southeastern qibla wall. Two transverse rows of arches – one on the south side of the courtyard and another about halfway between the courtyard and the qibla wall – also feature polylobed arches, and another polylobed arch runs transversally before the bay in front of the mihrab (niche symbolizing the direction of prayer).

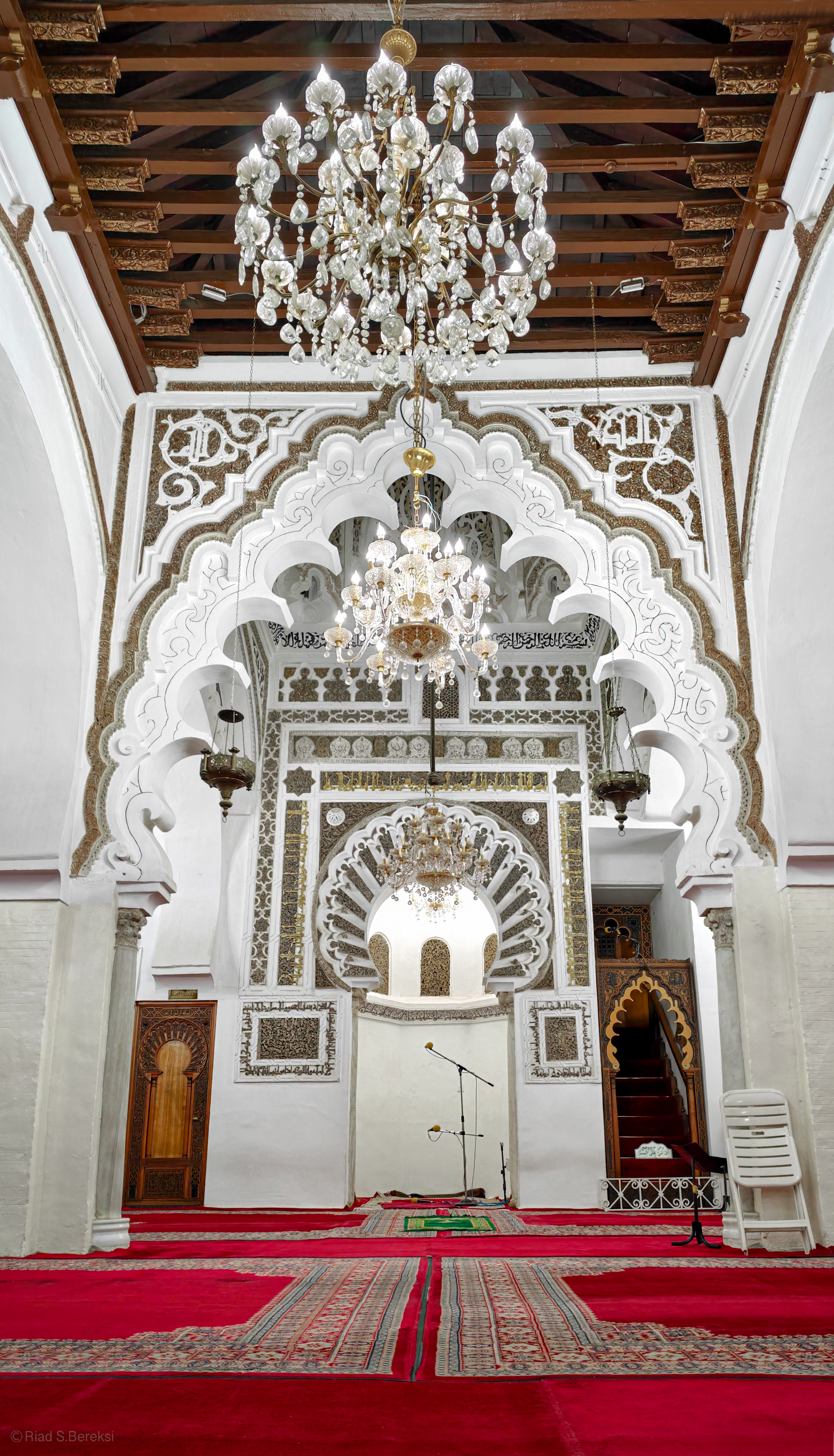
View of the mihrab and its surrounding area

The central aisle in front of the mihrab is wider than the other aisles. At this aisle's middle point, in front of the second row of transverse arches, is an ornamental ribbed dome, likely added by Yaghmorasan in the 13th century. Another ornamental dome, older and more intricate, covers the bay in front of the mihrab. Some of the arch pillars near the mihrab also feature marble columns. The mihrab itself is an alcove in the wall which opens through a horseshoe arch framed by intricate carved stucco decoration. The overall design of the mihrab follows the architectural precedents seen in the mihrab of the Great Mosque of Cordoba.

The intricate ribbed dome in front of the mihrab is considered a highlight of Almoravid architecture and dates to the renovation of Ali ibn Yusuf. The structure of the dome is strictly ornamental, consisting of multiple ribs or intersecting arches forming a twelve-pointed star pattern. It is also partly see-through, allowing some outside light to filter through a screen of pierced and carved arabesque and openwork decoration that fills the spaces between the ribs. The area below this dome, the maqsura, was once separated from the rest of the mosque by a richly-crafted wooden lattice screen. The screen has since been moved to the Museum of Art and History in Tlemcen. It bears an inscription dating it to 1138, also around the time of Ali ibn Yusuf's renovation.

The original Almoravid mosque presumably had no minaret, as the current minaret was only added in 1236 by Yaghmorasan. The minaret is made of brick and has a typical square floor plan, measuring 6.3 metres (21 feet) per side. It has a two-tiered shaft: the main shaft is 26.2 metres (86 feet) tall and a secondary lantern tower above this brings the total height to 29.15 metres (95.6 feet) meters. The four facades of the main shaft of the minaret are decorated with carved panels of sebka motifs springing from engaged columns below. An odd detail is the fact that the decorative panel on the courtyard side is uneven: the space between the engaged columns on the left is wider than the others, causing an uneven spacing within the sebka pattern above it as well. The top of the minaret was formerly crowned with an Arabic inscription made in copper, the pieces of which were moved to a local museum before 1903.

=== Chandelier ===
Suspended from the ribbed dome in the center of the prayer hall is a large circular chandelier. By popular tradition, its origin is attributed to a donation by Yaghmorasan in the 13th century. William and Georges Marçais speculated that it could be a work of Andalusi origin. Archeologist Lucien Golvin suggested that it was of slightly later date, possibly a spoil from the abandoned Marinid mosque of al-Mansura (beginning of the 14th century), where Ibn Marzuq described a chandelier that he had made and that had been moved to the Great Mosque of Tlemcen. The largest and lowest part of the chandelier had a circumference of around 8 metres (26 ft) and was made of cedar wood clad with sheets of copper that were pierced with floral motifs. In the 19th century, the chandelier had fallen into disrepair. Its remains were moved to a local museum and a replacement inside the mosque was created in the 20th century by Mohammed ben Kalfate, a metalworker and artisan from Tlemcen.

=== Influences and architectural legacy ===
Antonio Almagro, in an analysis of the mosque's architecture, has argued that its original shape and proportions were similar to those of major mosques in Al-Andalus such as the Great Mosque of Cordoba but that this parallel is now somewhat obscured by later modifications to the mosque. The celebrated ornamental dome and elaborate decoration added to the mosque by Ali ibn Yusuf, however, are considered exceptional and an important testimony of Almoravid craftsmanship which has rarely survived elsewhere. The design of the mosque's ornamental dome traces its origins to the 10th-century ribbed domes of the Great Mosque of Cordoba and subsequent domes in Al-Andalus, and in turn it inspired similar ornate domes in the Great Mosque of Fes el-Jdid and the Great Mosque of Taza, both built in the later Marinid period. Almagro and others see further parallels between the mosque's features and the decorative features found in the architecture of the Taifas period in Al-Andalus, notably with the Aljaferia palace of Zaragoza. Indeed, there are historical reports of a former room (now vanished) in the Aljaferia whose vaulted ceiling had openwork decoration reminiscent of the mosque's openwork dome, although the remains of decoration in the palace today suggest it was less delicate and subtle than the mosque's dome.

Jonathan Bloom remarks that the evidence simply suggests that the Almoravids, especially at the height of their power and culture under Ali ibn Yusuf, could afford to import craftsmen from Al-Andalus to work on their new monuments in North Africa. The increased ornamental complexity and sophistication of subsequent Maghrebi architecture, influenced by Andalusi architecture, is thus in part due to this Almoravid patronage. Bloom also notes that although we know the Almoravids built many other mosques, few examples of their architecture have survived, and therefore the Great Mosque of Tlemcen may not have been as "original" in its time as it appears now and its exceptional features today may have existed in other mosques that have now disappeared. The Almoravid expansion of the Qarawiyyin Mosque, for example, shows even more elaborate decoration overall than the Tlemcen mosque, although using different elements.

== See also ==
- Islam in Algeria
- List of mosques in Algeria
- High medieval domes
