= Great Mosque of Fes el-Jdid =

Mosque in Fez, Morocco

- الجامع الكبير
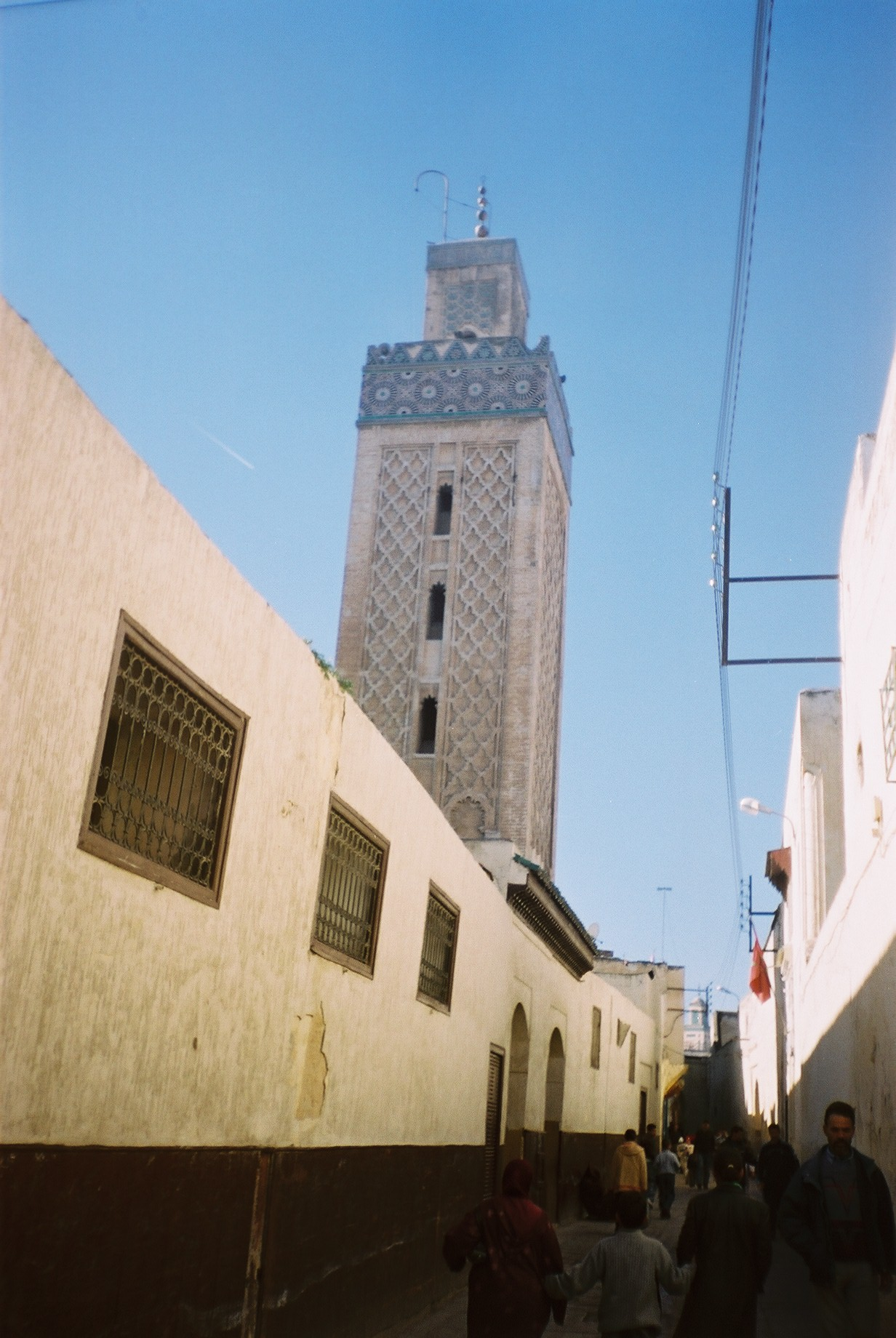

Religion
- Affiliation: Sunni Islam
- Status: active

Location
- Location: Fez, Morocco
- Interactive map of Great Mosque of Fes el-Jdid
- Coordinates: 34°03′26.94″N 4°59′29.86″W

Architecture
- Type: mosque
- Style: Moorish (Marinid)
- Founder: Abu Yusuf Yaqub
- Established: 1276

Specifications
- Minaret: 1
- Minaret height: (approx.) 29 m
- Materials: brick, wood

The Great Mosque of Fes el-Jdid (Arabic: الجامع الكبير) is the historic main Friday mosque of Fes el-Jdid, the royal city and Marinid-era citadel of Fez, Morocco. It is believed to have been founded in 1276, around the same time that the city itself was founded, making it the oldest mosque in Fes el-Jdid. It was likely redecorated at a later period. The mosque follows the usual layout of North African mosques with a hypostyle prayer hall, internal courtyard, and ornate minaret. Its annexes include a mausoleum containing several tombs, one of which is commonly believed to be that of Sultan Abu Inan, although this is not confirmed by any inscriptions.

== History ==
The mosque was founded around 1276 by the Marinid sultan Abu Yusuf, at the same time as he founded a new royal city, Fes el-Jdid ('New Fez'). Fes el-Jdid was created as a fortified palace and administrative city, separate from Fes el-Bali ('Old Fez'), from which the Marinid dynasty ruled over Morocco. Supervision of the mosque's construction was delegated to a man named Abu Abdallah ibn Abd al-Karim el-Jadudi and to the governor of Meknes, Abu Ali ibn Azraq. One historical chronicle claims that the mosque's construction was funded in part by olive oil production in Meknes and that labour was provided by Christian prisoners captured in al-Andalus (present-day Spain). The mosque's construction was completed in 1278. Its minbar (pulpit), designed by a craftsman named "Algharnati", was finished in 1279. The maqsura (wooden screen shielding the sultan during prayers) and the mosque's grand chandelier were installed in 1280. The mosque was only the fourth Friday mosque (a grand mosque hosting Friday sermons) to be founded in Fez (the others being the Qarawiyyin Mosque, the Andalusi Mosque, and the Bou Jeloud Mosque) and was meant to serve the new city.

In 1320, Sultan Abu Sa'id built a madrasa near the mosque, the Madrasa Fes Jdid or Madrasa Dar al-Makhzen. However, it was never able to compete with the prestige of the madrasas in Fes el-Bali and was later absorbed by the expanding Royal Palace. Sultan Abu Inan is believed to have been buried in a tomb adjoining the mosque upon his death in 1358, although this is not fully confirmed. Abu Inan's burial here marked a shift in the choice of burial sites of the Marinid sultans, as up to that point they had been buried in the necropolis of Chellah and after this they were buried instead on the al-Qula Hill north of Fez (whose ruins are now known as the Marinid Tombs). The Rawd al-Qirtas, a 14th-century chronicle, mentions that one of the sons of Abu Yaqub Yusuf, named Abu Muhammad 'Abd al-Mu'min, was buried in a courtyard on the south side of the mosque in 1293, which suggests that a funerary site developed around the mosque early on.

A foundation inscription in the mosque, carved in stone, also records that it was "completed" by Sultan Abu Faris Abd al-Aziz II in 1395. This leaves the chronology of the current mosque's construction open to interpretation. The building's floor plan is very regular, which suggests it was not significantly altered or rebuilt and that its construction was not interrupted and then completed at a later date. Georges Marçais, a scholar of North African Islamic architecture, argued that the 1395 inscription refers to an embellishment or restoration of the mosque, not to its construction or reconstruction, and that this work mostly affected the mosque's decoration. In his view, the decoration around the mihrab is too evolved to be attributed as early as the 13th century and the attached tomb of Abu Inan still dates in its current form to the mid-14th century, which would be consistent with the hypothesis that the mosque was built before the mid-14th century and redecorated in the late 14th century.

There is evidence that the mosque was also significantly restored in the later 'Alawi period (late 17th century and after). The anaza of the mosque's courtyard, for example, is dated to 1678–1679 CE (1089 AH) during the reign of Moulay Isma'il, and some of the mosque's decoration might also date from around this period.

== Architecture ==
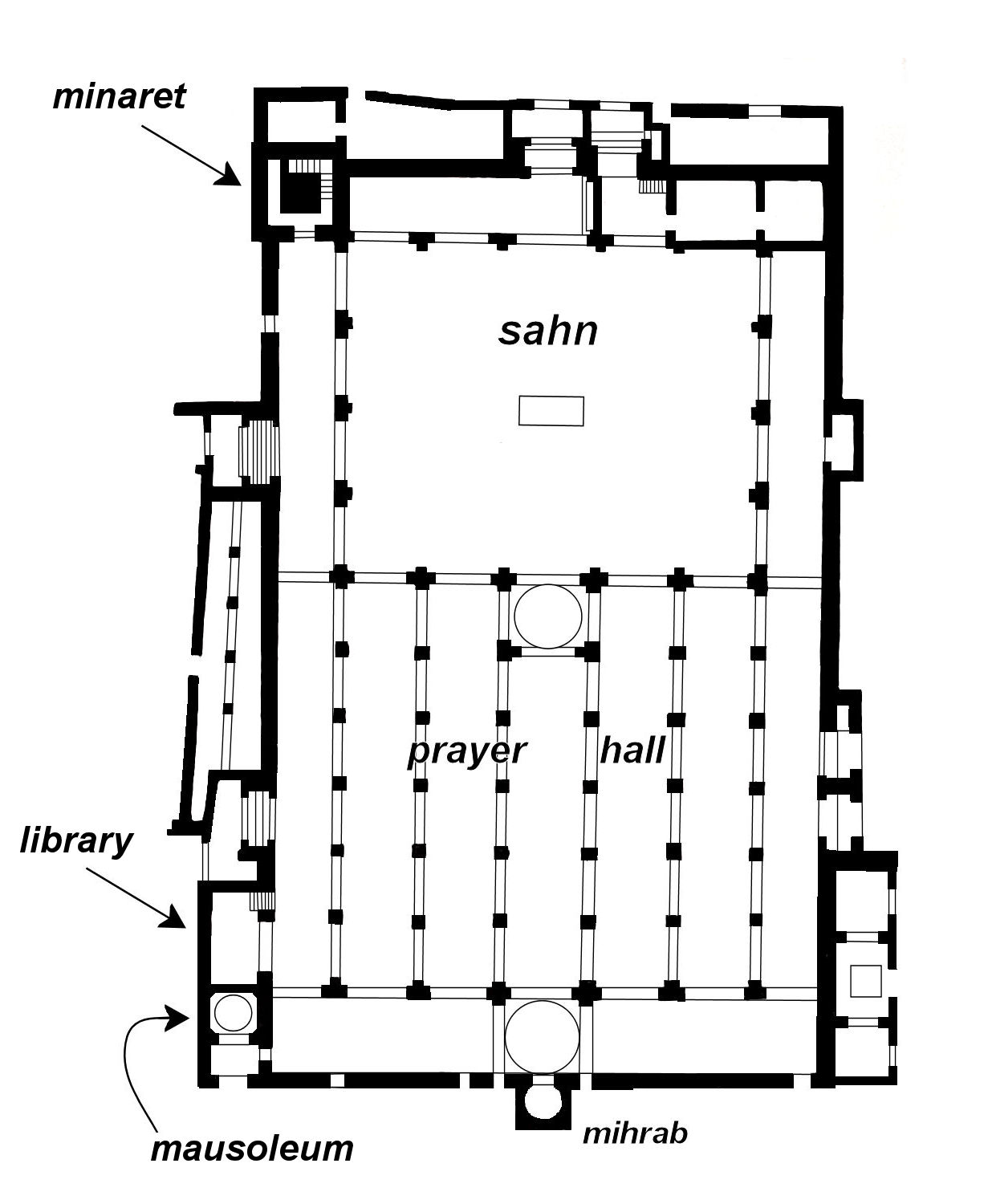
Floor plan of the mosque, with notable elements indicated.

The mosque's overall layout reflects the "T-plan" that became standard in western (Maghrebi) mosques in the Almohad period. The building has a rectangular floor plan, measuring about 54 by 34 meters and covering about 2000 square meters. The layout includes a vast hypostyle interior prayer space and a large rectangular courtyard (sahn) occupying most of the northern part of the building.

=== The entrances ===
The mosque's main entrance is to the north, aligned with the mihrab (see below) at the opposite end of the building and leading into the courtyard. The entrance is doubled: to the left (east) of the main gate is another gate. This resembles the arrangement of the double northern gate of the Qarawiyyin Mosque (named Bab al-Ward and Bab al-Hafa), whereby one gate featured a water channel which allowed visitors to wash their feet as they entered, while the other gate was a regular entrance. However, it seems likely that in this case the second gate was designed to give direct access to a walled-in gallery section in the northeastern corner of the courtyard which was reserved for women coming to pray.

The mosque also had two gates on its eastern side and two more on its western side; on both sides, one gate led into the courtyard and another directly into the prayer hall to the south. On the eastern side of the mosque, the courtyard gate was at some point blocked off by the later construction of houses next to the mosque. Perhaps because of this, the remaining gate was also turned into a double gate with two doorways side by side.

The southern wall of the mihrab also has several doorways that lead to an annex space used by the imam. From here, there was also originally a direct access to one of the courtyards of the Dar al-Makhzen (royal palace and government offices).

=== The courtyard (sahn) ===
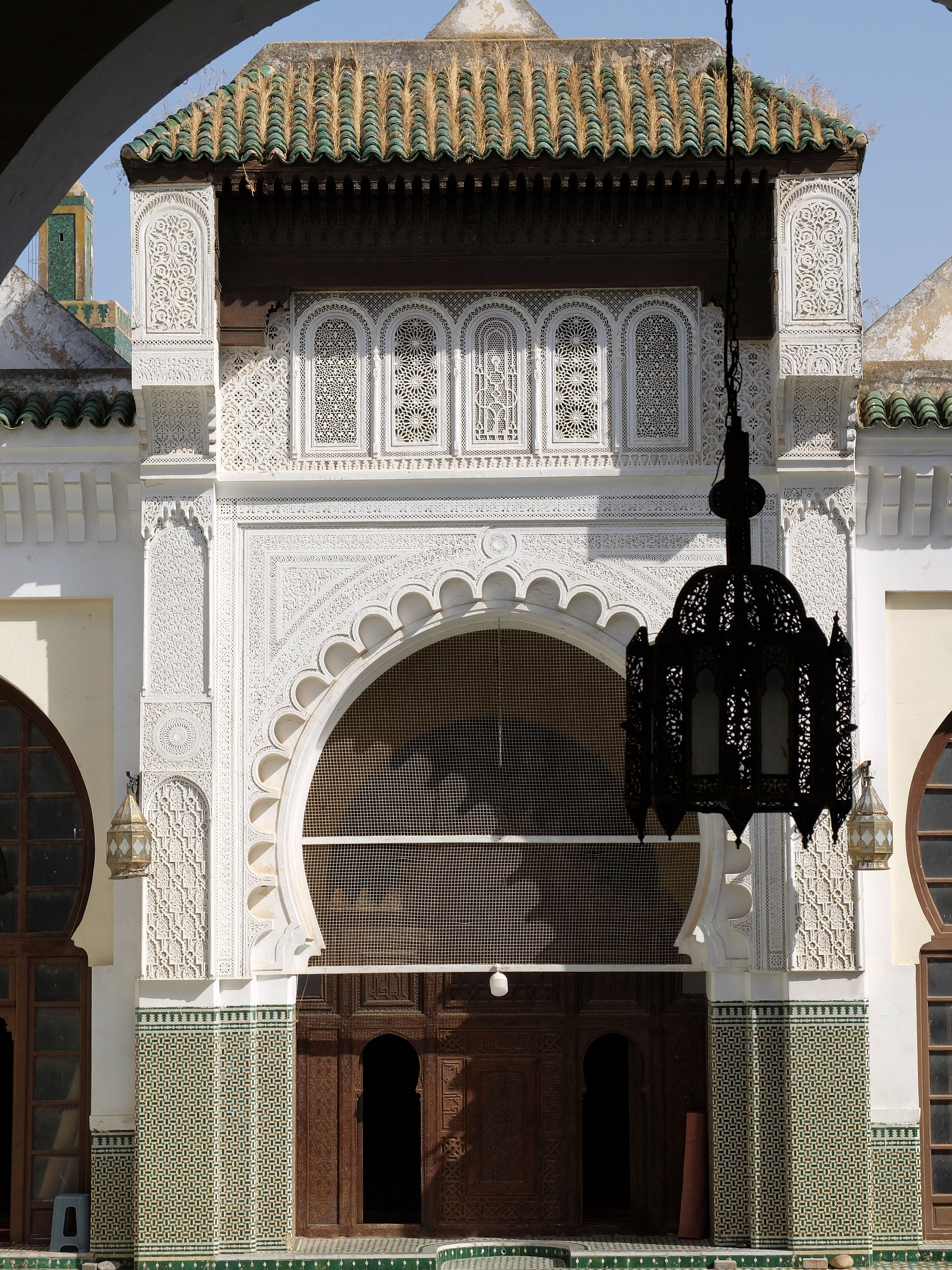
The central arch of the prayer hall façade in the courtyard

The main courtyard (sahn) occupied roughly the northern half of the mosque, measuring 24 by 18.6 meters. Like in other mosques, it has a central water basin (formerly linked to two other fountains on either side) and is surrounded by arched galleries. The floor is paved with mosaic tiles (zellij). The central arch on the south side of the courtyard, which leads into the central "nave" of the prayer hall on the axis of the mihrab, is framed by a tall and ornate portal. The surfaces around the arch are decorated with carved stucco and crowned by a carved and painted wooden canopy, which likely date from the 16th or 17th century during the later 'Alawi period.

The arch itself is occupied by an ornate wooden screen known as an anaza; an outdoor or "summer" mihrab for those prayers taking place in the courtyard. The anaza has two doors, between which, in the middle, is a decorative composition with a mihrab shape containing a carved inscription in Arabic calligraphy. This feature is reminiscent of an equivalent creation added by the Marinids to the courtyard of the Qarawiyyin Mosque. The current anaza here, however, dates from 1678–1679 CE (1089 AH), during the reign of Sultan Moulay Isma'il. Art historian Xavier Salmon suggests that Moulay Isma'il likely donated the anaza at the same time as he restored or added some of the mosque's decoration, although the latter may also date from his brother and predecessor, Moulay Rashid (ruled 1666–1672). By comparison, the inner archway of the central northern gate into the courtyard (directly opposite the anaza), has stucco decoration which seems to preserve more of a Marinid style.

=== The prayer hall ===
Like other standard Moroccan mosques, the prayer hall is a vast interior hypostyle space split only by rows of arches running perpendicular to the southern wall, except for an extra row of arches running close to the southern wall and parallel to it. The southern wall is also the qibla wall (the direction of prayer), and is marked by a mihrab (niche symbolizing the qibla) in the middle. Of the aisles between the rows of arches, the center one, aligned with the mihrab, is slightly wider than the others and is emphasized with added stucco decoration on the walls between the arches.

The mihrab itself is an alcove in the wall, inside of which is a small cupola of muqarnas (stalactite-like carving). The wall around the mihrab is decorated with stucco carving and topped by windows with intricate stucco screens. The stucco decoration inside the mihrab niche and immediately around the arch of the mihrab likely dates from the original Marinid design, but the decoration further above and around this is more likely from the later 'Alawi period, in the late 17th or 18th century. The square space formed by the rows of arches intersecting in front of the mihrab is distinguished by more elaborate arches with lobed or lambrequin outlines (a type seen elsewhere in Moorish architecture) and decorated spandrels. The arch directly in front of the mihrab and across from it has muqarnas-carved intrados. The stucco decoration of this arch the two other flanking arches of this square space likely date from the Marinid period, but may have undergone later alterations. The square space is covered by an ornate wooden cupola carved with geometric patterns and outlined with more muqarnas. The wooden cupola also dates from the late 17th or 18th century, probably at the same time as the 'Alawi-period decoration elsewhere in the mosque. The square space is also further marked off from the rest of the mosque by another wooden screen with painted panels and a central door to give access, a feature not typical to most other mosques.

The wooden ceiling and other decoration in the rest of the central aisle leading to the mihrab dates from the 'Alawi period. At the northern end of the central aisle, just behind the anaza, is an elaborately ornate ribbed dome, similar to the slightly earlier examples of this type found in front of the mihrabs of the Great Mosque of Taza and the Great Mosque of Tlemcen, ultimately deriving from the domes of the Great Mosque of Cordoba. The 24 intersecting ribs of the dome form a star pattern, at the middle of which is a mini-cupola of muqarnas. Between the ribs are rich arabesques carved in stucco which also form a screen allowing some light in from the outside. The corners of the dome transition into the square space of the walls with the help of muqarnas-carved squinches. Although Georges Marçais dated it to the Marinid period, Xavier Salmon has questioned this, based on inconsistencies in the cupola's decoration, and suggests that it was either created or restored during the 'Alawi period, possibly by Moulay Isma'il (who also commissioned the nearby anaza) or by Moulay Rashid.

The mosque's main chandelier, according to one source, was installed in 1280, weighs 715 pounds, and has 287 candlesticks. It hangs in the central aisle in front of the mihrab, and is considered by some to be one of the best Marinid-era examples of its kind.

=== The library and mausoleum ===
On the mosque's western side, near its southwestern corner, is a rectangular chamber which is raised above the rest of the mosque and reached via a short staircase from the prayer hall. The chamber has a large arched window looking back into the prayer hall. According to Xavier Salmon, the chamber was originally a bayt al-'itikaf (Arabic: بيت الاعتكاف), a room for spiritual retreat; a feature which became more common in later Saadian mosques in Marrakesh (e.g. the Mouassine Mosque and Bab Doukkala Mosque). In later centuries it was converted into a library, probably on the initiative of Moulay Rashid (in the late 17th century), who may have also redecorated parts of the mosque at the same time.

On the south side of this library, at the far southwestern corner of the mosque, is another annex composed of a rectangular chamber which leads to a square chamber with a dome. This domed chamber in turn once led to what appears to have been a tomb chamber located under the library, but which was later walled-up and was only reopened during renovations in 1950. The domed chamber is richly decorated with carved stucco and with zellij tile mosaic along its lower walls, and the dome has muqarnas squinches. The dome is articulated by 24 intersecting ribs that form a twelve-sided polygon. It has rich carved plaster decoration. When it was observed by Alfred Bel in 1917, it still retained some of its former painted colours in blue and red, but it has since been heavily coated with whitewash, which obscures some of its craftsmanship. The small rectangular room preceding it holds four tombs and contains only fragments of its original decoration. This room is also open to the outside of the mosque via an archway window or door.

The tombs in this area are carved with Qur'anic verses but some of them do not have any other identifying inscriptions, which has made it difficult to confirm the individuals buried here. In particular, one of the tombs (possibly in the walled-up chamber under the library) is assumed to belong to Sultan Abu Inan, the Marinid ruler who also built the Bou Inania Madrasa in Fes el-Bali (among other works) and died in 1358, but no inscription confirms this. The circumstances of Abu Inan's assassination, his rapid burial, and the palace coup that followed, may explain why his tombstone was never inscribed. Another unidentified tombstone may belong to an earlier sultan, Abu Sa'id Uthman II, who died in 1331 and was the father of Sultan Abu al-Hassan (and grandfather of Abu Inan). Among the other individuals buried here is a princess named Aisha, daughter of Sultan Abu Faris Abd al-Aziz II, whose tombstone is now held at the Batha Museum.

=== The minaret ===
The minaret rises from the mosque's northwestern corner. Like most Moroccan minarets, it has a square shaft with two sections: a main section rising most of the way, and then a second, much smaller square tower at its summit. The main shaft measures 5.7 meters per side and is 22.8 meters tall (the shaft is about exactly four times as tall as it is wide). The smaller tower at the top measures 2.9 meters per side and 6.4 meters tall. Inside the minaret is a staircase that wraps around the central core of the tower and leads to the platform at the top of the main shaft, historically allowing the muezzin to ascend to the top for the call to prayer.

The four facades of the minaret are decorated similarly with darj wa ktaf motifs (Moroccan rhombus-like decorative forms) carved into the brick. Only the eastern side of the minaret has windows (providing light into the staircase). The motif on the northern and southern facades is slightly different from that on the eastern and western facades, in that the top of each rhombus is split by the start of the one above. Except for the southern facade, the bottom of each facade has blind arches that blend into the rest of the motif above. At the top of the main shaft is a wide band of mosaic tilework (zellij) with geometric patterns of radiating, almost circular, stars. Above this, crowning the top of the main shaft, are saw-toothed merlons (also typical of Moroccan architecture) whose surfaces are also covered in mosaic tilework. The small secondary shaft at the top of the minaret has similar decoration as the main shaft. It is topped by a small cupola which in turn is topped by a metal pole holding four bronze spheres of decreasing size.

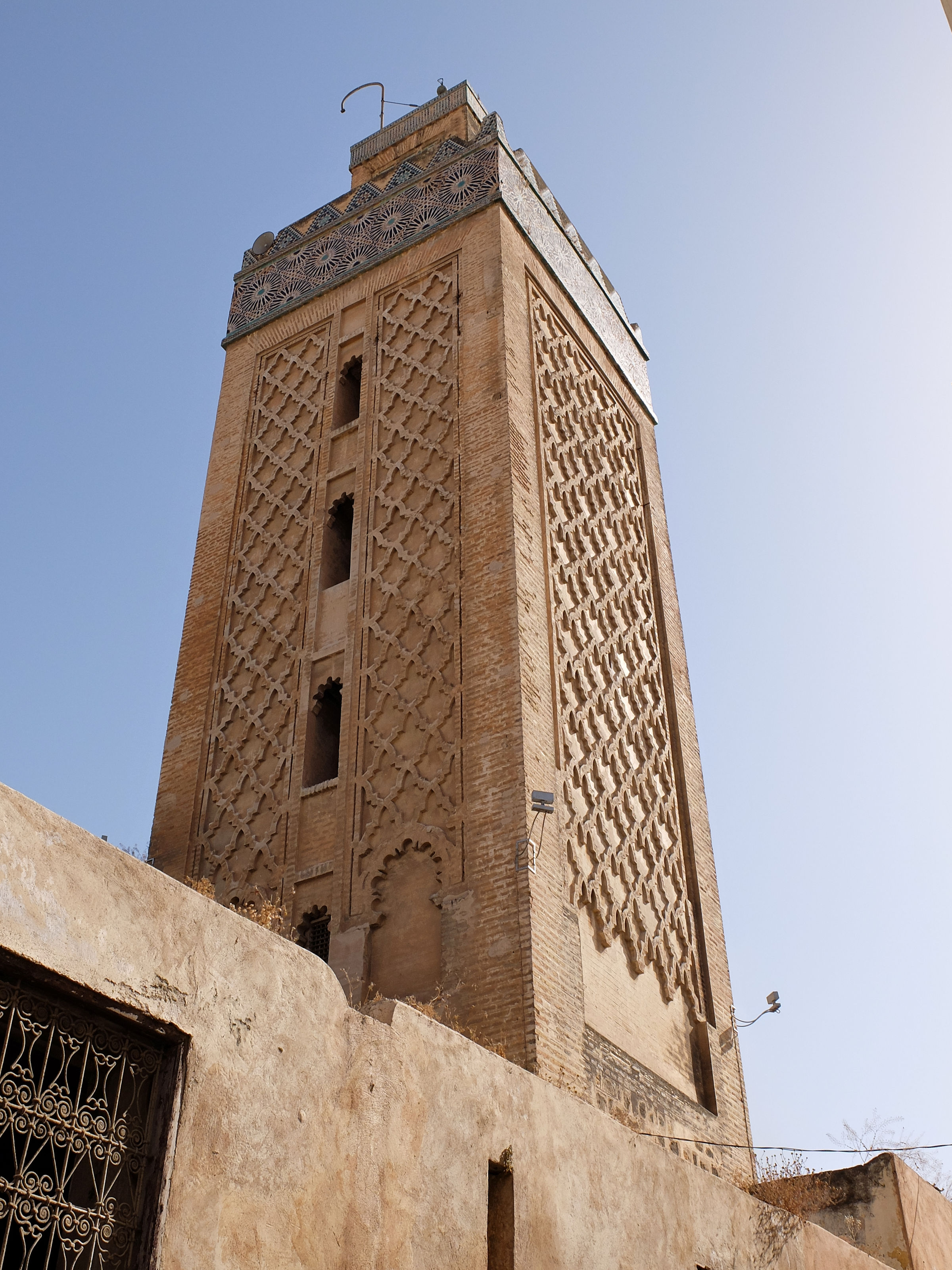
Northeastern and northwestern façades of the minaret

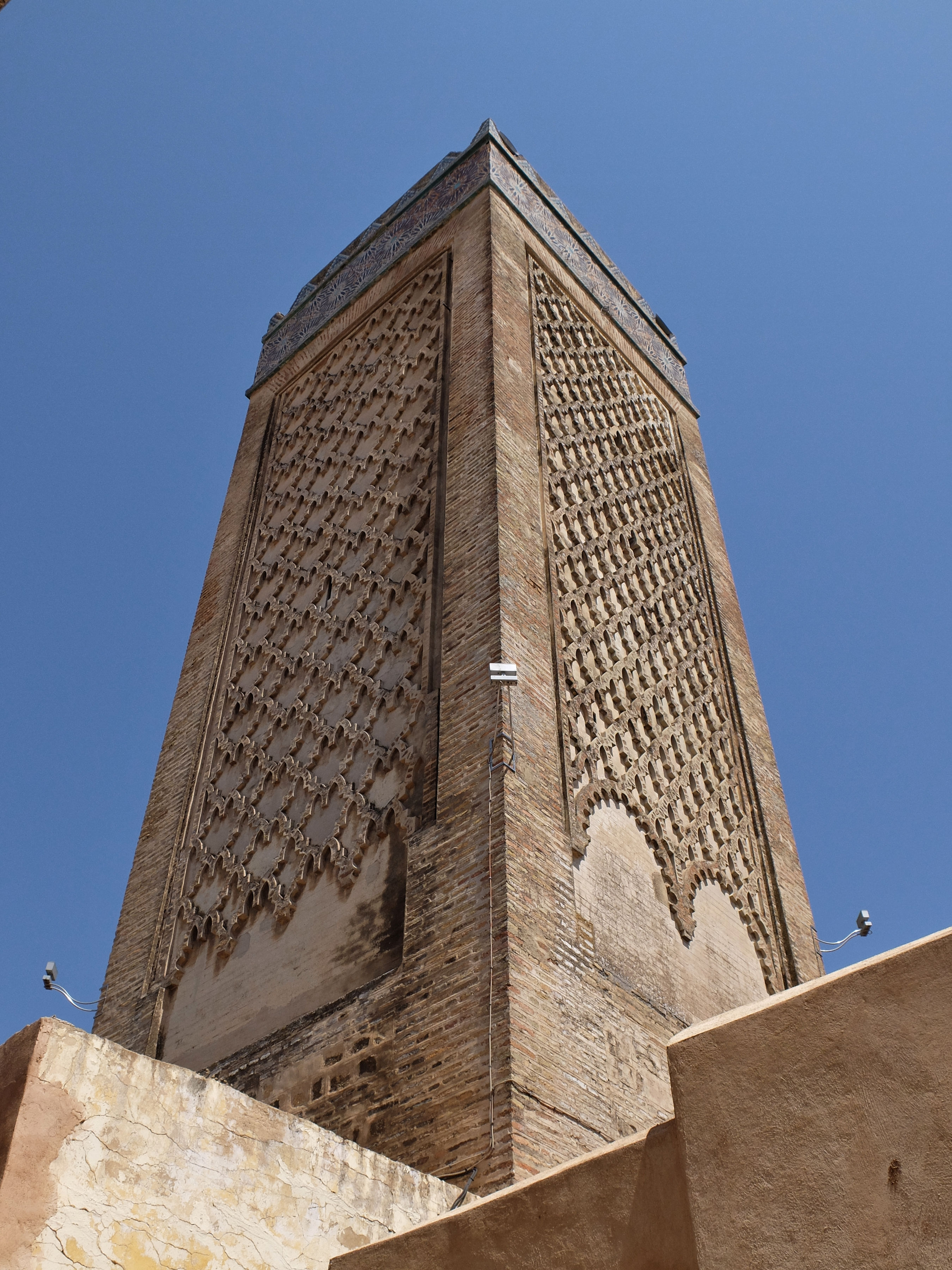
Northwestern and southwestern façades

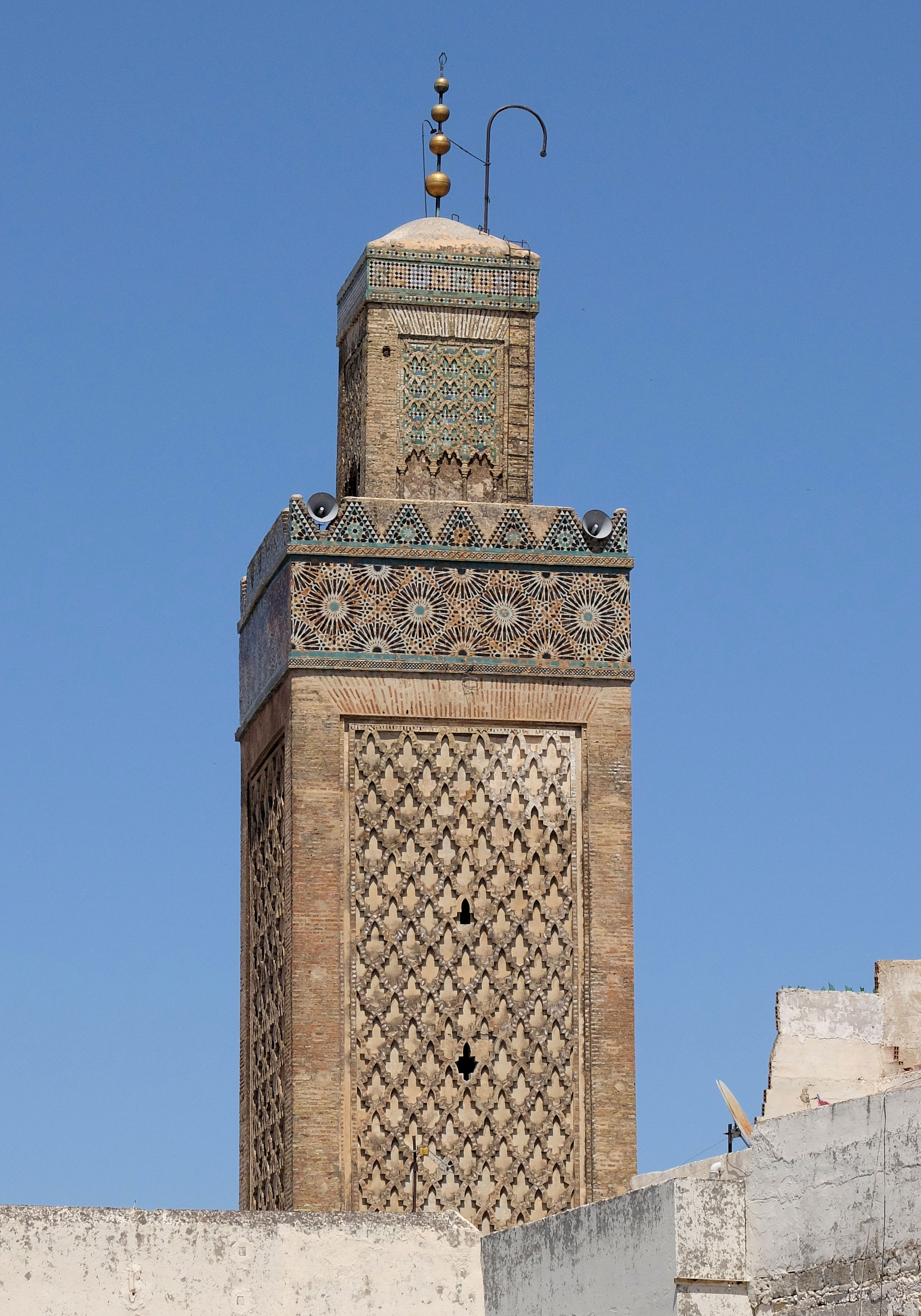
Southwestern façade, with clearer view of the top turret

Adjoining the southern base of the minaret, above the gallery of the courtyard, is a chamber for the muezzin which was likely added after the minaret's original construction. Seen from the courtyard, this chamber is marked by a double-arched window, with an alabaster column between the arches, overshadowed by a carved wooden awning. It was similar in form and purpose to a Dar al-Muwaqqit (such as the one also added to the Qarawiyyin Mosque shortly after).

== Madrasa of Fes el-Jdid ==
In 1320 Sultan Abu Sa'id built a madrasa in Fes el-Jdid just south of the Grand Mosque which became known as the Madrasa Fes Jdid or Madrasa Dar al-Makhzen. This was only the second madrasa built by the Marinids in Fez, the first one having been the Seffarine Madrasa founded in 1271 near the Qarawiyyin Mosque. Shortly after, in 1321, also under Abu Sa'id's reign, the Sahrij Madrasa was built near the Mosque of the Andalusians. Accordingly, it is likely that Abu Sa'id desired to create centers of learning around each of Fez's great mosques. However, it does not appear that the Fes el-Jdid madrasa developed into a major center of learning, and instead the most prestigious madrasas remained the al-Qarawiyyin and the other Marinid madrasas later built in Fes el-Bali. It was later absorbed by the Royal Palace complex when Sultan Moulay Hassan (ruled 1873-1894) expanded the mechouar area of the palace to the northeast, which resulted in the madrasa being cut off from the mosque and integrated into the inner mechouar. The madrasa, likely derelict before then, was renovated and given a minaret, before being renovated again under the French Protectorate some time after 1924.

== See also ==
- Lists of mosques
- List of mosques in Africa
- List of mosques in Morocco
