= Bou Inania Madrasa (Meknes) =

Historic madrasa in Meknes, Morocco

- المدرسة البوعنانية
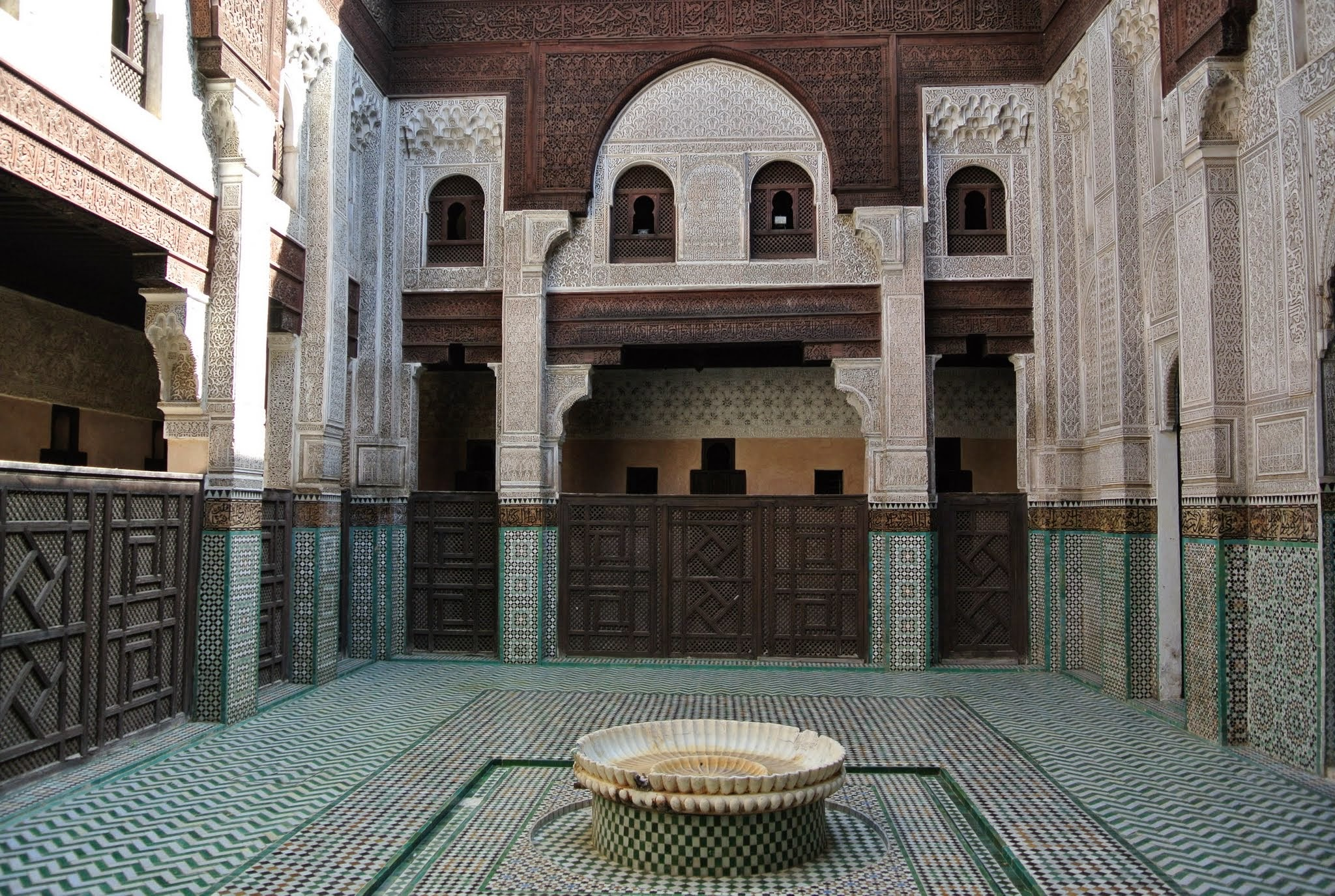
- The central courtyard of the madrasa
- Interactive map of the Bou Inania Madrasa area

General information
- Type: madrasa
- Architectural style: Moorish (Marinid)
- Location: Meknes, Morocco
- Coordinates: 33°53′42.6″N 5°33′55.4″W
- Completed: 1335-1336 CE

Technical details
- Material: cedar wood, brick, stucco, tile
- Floor count: 2

The Bou Inania Madrasa (Arabic: المدرسة البوعنانية al-madrasa al-Būʿinānīya; Berber languages: ⴰⵙⵉⵏⴰⵏ ⴱⵓ ⵉⵏⴰⵏⵉⵢⴰ) is a historic madrasa (Islamic learning center) in the city of Meknes, Morocco. The building, well-preserved thanks to later restorations, is considered an excellent example of the richly decorated madrasas of the Marinid period.

== History ==
Contrary to what the name might suggest, it was not founded by the Marinid ruler Abu Inan Faris but rather by his father Abu al-Hasan Ali ibn Othman in 1335-36, as inscriptions in the madrasa itself indicate. Abu Inan most likely restored the madrasa later during his own reign, which may account for its current name. Even so, the madrasa was originally known as Madrasat al-Jadida ("New Madrasa") and the name Bu Inaniya is only used by historical sources at a much later date. There is a madrasa with the same name in the city of Fes, which was built entirely by Abu Inan.

The madrasa's construction was supervised by the city's qadi, Abdallah ibn Abi al-Ghamr. It was one of several madrasas in the area around the nearby Grand Mosque of Meknes, the city's main mosque where teaching also took place. The two other main madrasas, also built by Abu al-Hasan, were the Madrasa Shuhud and the Madrasat al-Qadi. The latter was remodeled afterwards by sultan Moulay Isma'il (ruled 1672-1727), who devoted it to students from the Tafilalt. Like these other madrasas, the Bou Inania Madrasa was devoted to teaching Islamic sciences but also to providing housing for students.

== Architecture ==
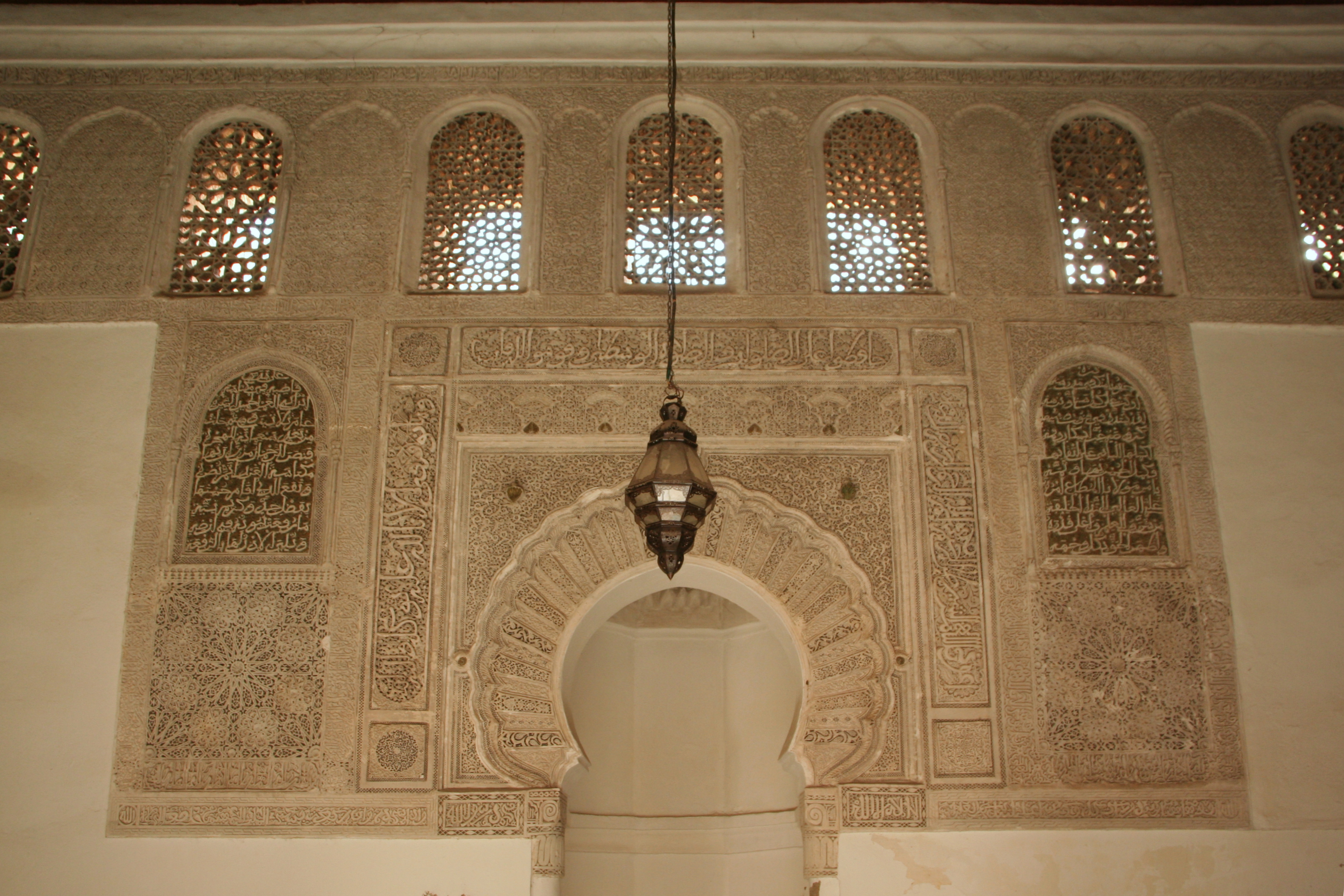
The mihrab in the prayer hall

The madrasa covers an area of about 315 square meters. It is entered from the street via a set of wooden doors with decorative copper fittings which leads to a long vestibule passage. At the end of this passage is the entrance to the madrasa's main courtyard on one side, the entrance to the madrasa's ablutions house (for ritual washing) on the other, and the stairs leading to the upper floor. The ablutions house (Dar al-Wudu) consists of another courtyard surrounded by 22 changing rooms or latrines and centered around a large rectangular water basin.

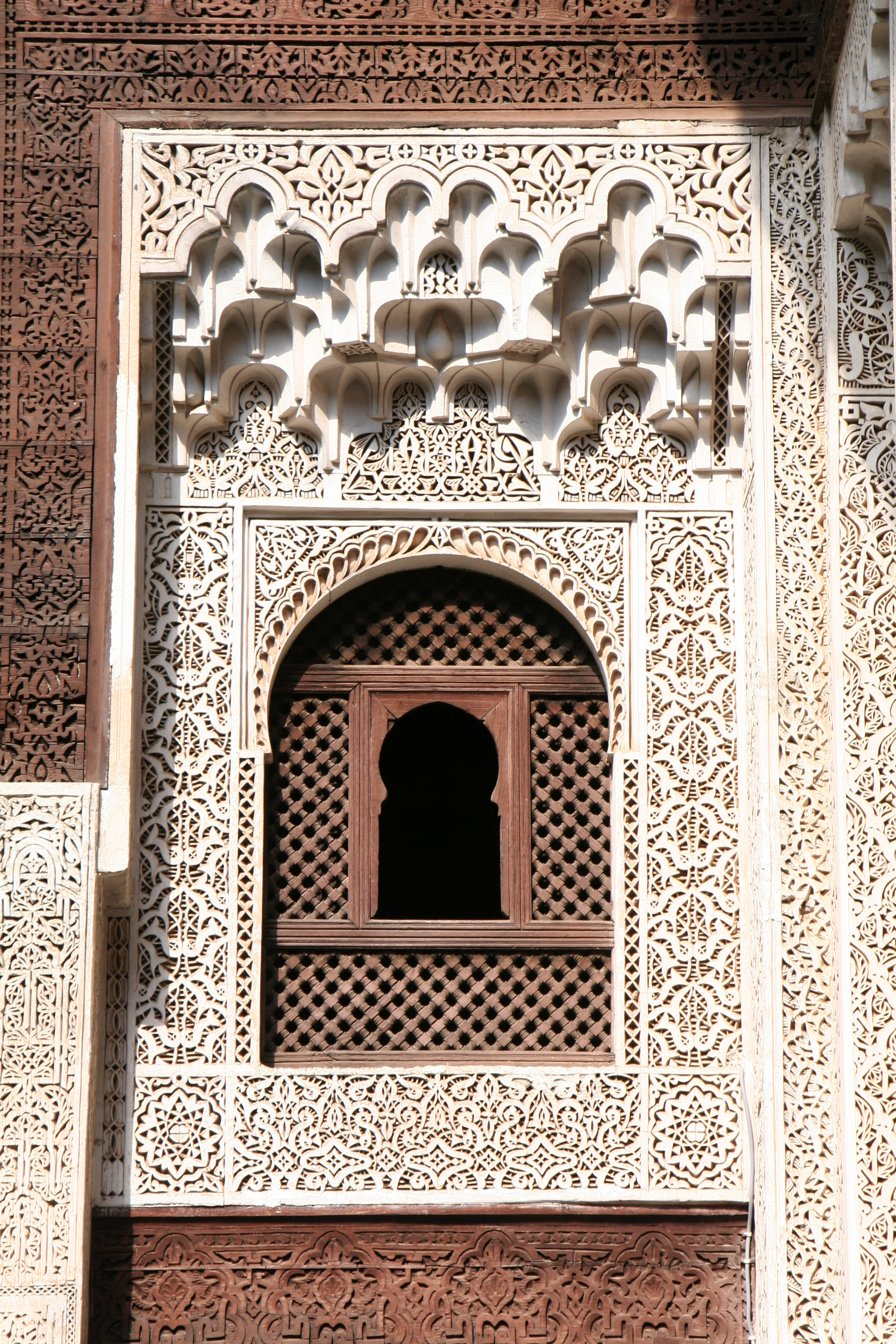
Details of the stucco and wood-carved decoration around the courtyard

The madrasa's main courtyard has a marble water fountain in the middle and is surrounded by galleries on either side. The courtyard is richly decorated, with the floor and lower walls covered in zellij mosaic tilework and the rest of the walls covered in elaborate carved stucco and carved wood. The galleries, shielded by mashrabiya wooden screens, also provide access to the students' private rooms on the ground floor, while more rooms are situated on the upper floor around the courtyard (many of them with windows onto the courtyard), for a total of 39 student rooms (13 on the ground floor and 26 on the upper floor. On the courtyard's southeastern side is a large chamber, entered via an ornate archway with muqarnas, which served as the madrasa's mosque or prayer hall. In the middle of its southeastern wall is a mihrab (niche symbolizing the direction of prayer) which is surrounded by intricately carved stucco decoration with arabesque and geometric motifs as well as Arabic inscriptions.

French scholar George Marçais, in his major work on Islamic architecture in the region, noted that the Bu Inania Madrasa of Meknes represented a kind of architectural transition between the madrasas built by Abu al-Hasan and the ones built by his son Abu Inan.

== See also ==
- Madrasa of Abu al-Hasan (in Salé)
- Al-Attarine Madrasa (Fes)
- Sahrij Madrasa (Fes)
- Ben Youssef Madrasa (Marrakesh)
