= Grand Mosque of Meknes =

Mosque in Meknes, Morocco

- مسجد مكناس الكبير
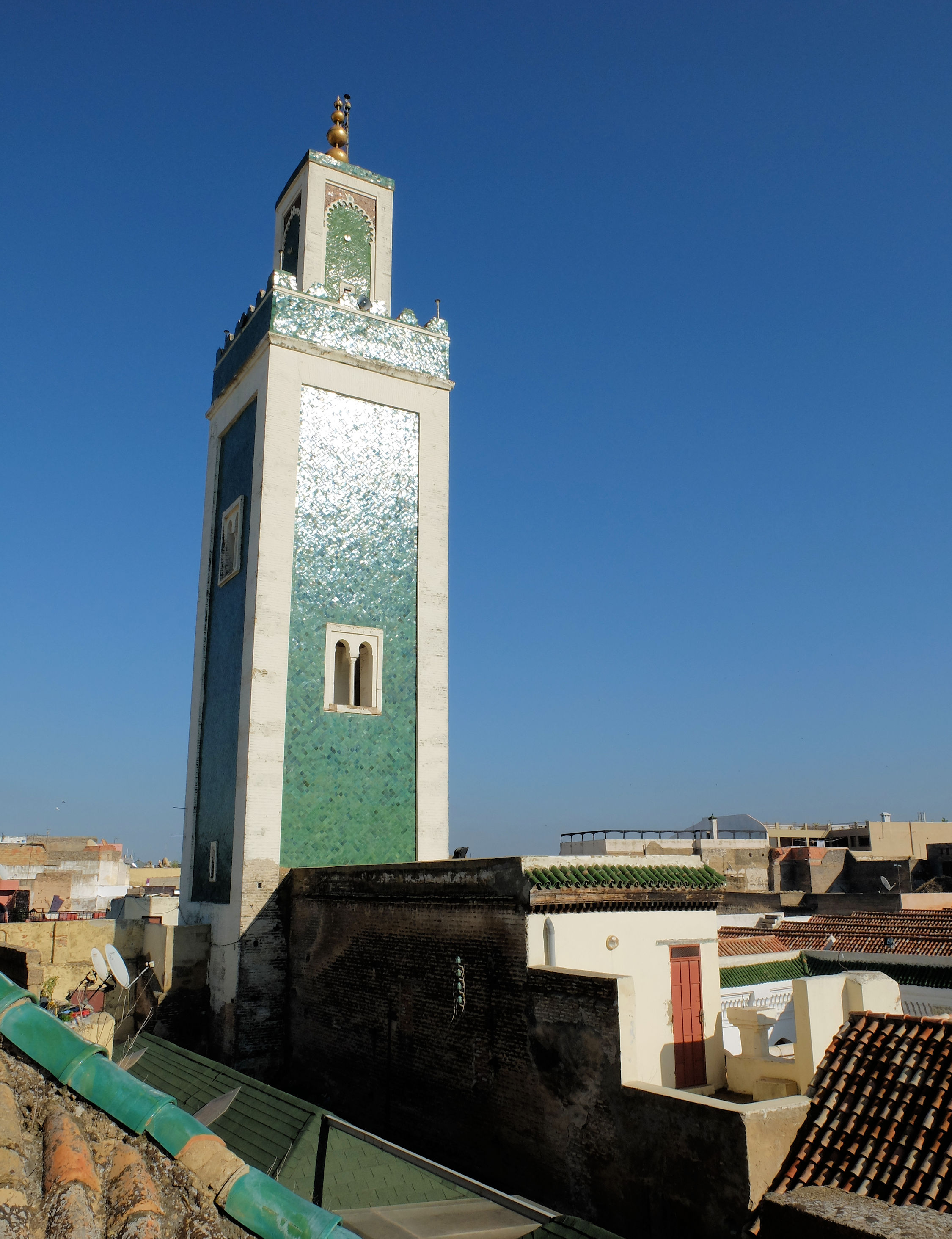
- Minaret of the mosque.

Religion
- Affiliation: Islam
- Sect: Sunni (Maliki)
- Status: active

Location
- Location: Meknes, Morocco
- Interactive map of Grand Mosque of Meknes
- Coordinates: 33°53′41.5″N 5°33′53.8″W

Architecture
- Type: Mosque
- Style: Moorish, Moroccan
- Established: 12th century (Almoravid period)
- Minaret: 1

The Grand Mosque of Meknes (Arabic: مسجد مكناس الكبير) is the historic main mosque (Friday mosque) of the old city (medina) of Meknes, Morocco. It is the largest and most important mosque in the old city and one of its oldest monuments.

== Historical background ==
Like many grand mosques in other Moroccan cities (e.g. Ben Youssef Mosque in Marrakesh or al-Qayrawiyyin in Fez or Grand Mosque of Salé in Salé), the mosque is located at the center of the old city and anchors its most important commercial and religious district, which contains the city's main souq streets (also referred to as the qaysariyya or kissaria) and its major historic madrasas, all located near the mosque.

The mosque is believed to have been built in the 12th century under the Almoravid dynasty. It underwent significant restoration and expansion under the Almohad caliph Muhammad al-Nasir (ruled 1199–1213), who, among other things, diverted a new source of water to it from a source 9 kilometres south of the city. From the Almohad period the mosque also preserves a large and ornate copper chandelier similar in style to the great Almohad chandelier in the al-Qarawiyyin Mosque in Fes.

The mosque underwent major restorations again in the 14th century, under the Marinids. Among other things, the minaret was repaired after having earlier collapsed and killed 7 worshipers. The Marinids were especially responsible for building the major madrasas of the city, which tended to orbit around the mosque. These included the nearby Bou Inania Madrasa (built in 1336) and two other madrasas, Madrasa al-Qadi and Madrasa Shuhud, all built by Sultan Abu el-Hassan. Abu el-Hassan also added a library to the mosque and arranged for a number of Islamic scholars to teach at the mosque.

Lastly, further restorations and modifications took place under the Alawi sultans. Moulay Ismail (ruled 1672–1727) remodeled the mihrab area and gifted the mosque with its current minbar, its anaza, and some of the fountains in its courtyard. Moulay Mohammed ben Abdallah (ruled 1757–1790), in turn, built the minaret that stands today.

== Architecture ==
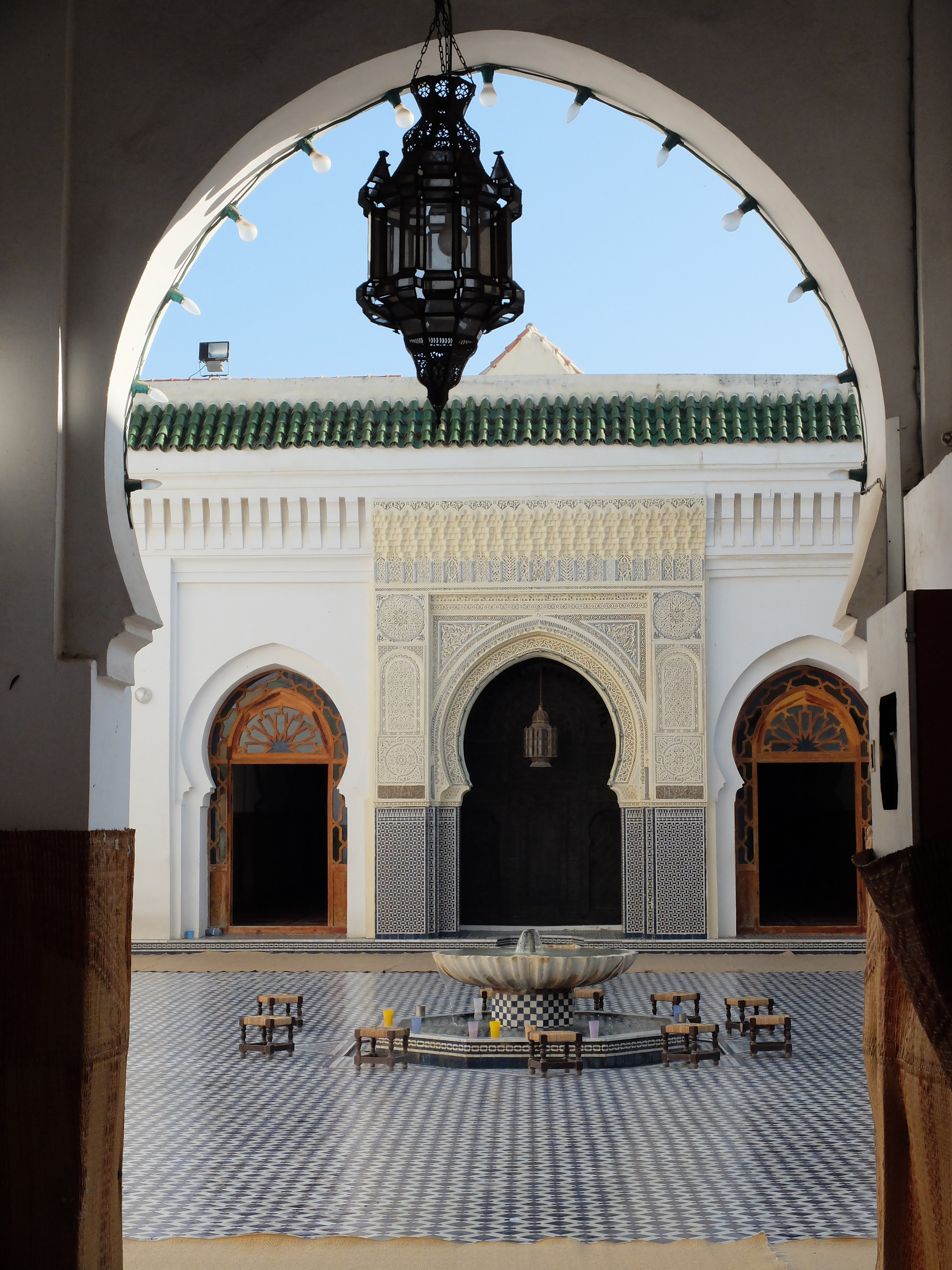
View of the courtyard and fountain from the northern entrance.

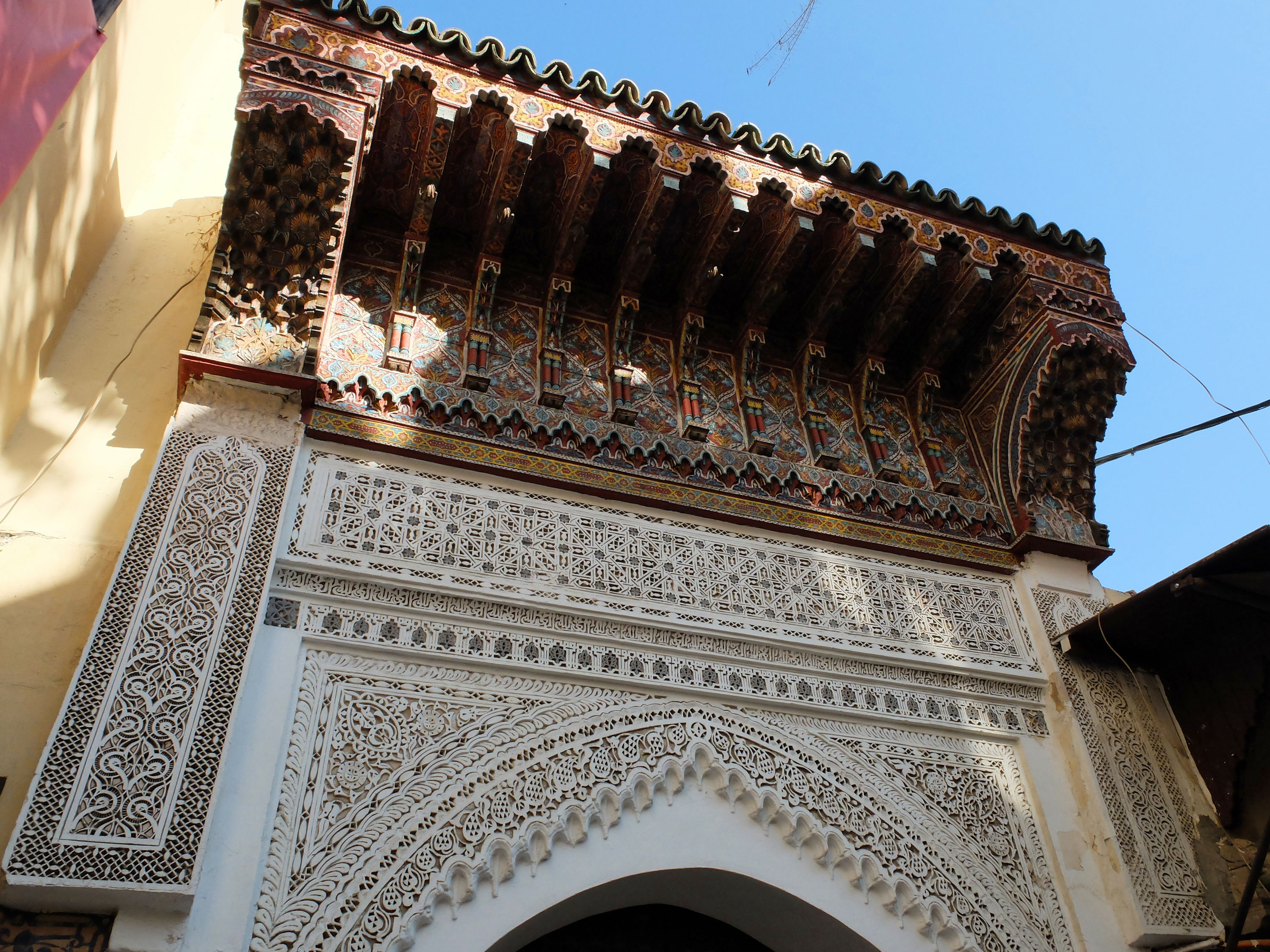
Ornamentation over the mosque's main western door, Bab al-Kutub.

The form and layout of the mosque is typical of traditional Moroccan or North African mosques. It has an area of about 3500 square metres. It is made up of a vast interior prayer hall whose main area (south of the courtyard) is divided into nine aisles by rows of arches running parallel to the southern/southeastern wall (i.e. the qibla wall, the wall in the direction of prayer). The arches and columns are plain, while the floor is covered with mats. Down the middle of the prayer hall, running roughly north-to-south and perpendicular to the southern wall, is a central "nave" which is slightly more prominent than the rest of the space around it and which leads towards the mihrab (a niche symbolizing the direction of prayer). The mihrab itself is decorated with carved and painted stucco and dates from the remodeling under Moulay Ismail (ruled 1672–1727). The nearby minbar (mosque pulpit) dates from this time too.

In the northern section of the mosque is a large courtyard (sahn) with a central fountain to assist in ablutions. The courtyard is paved with zellij tiles and is surrounded on three sides by the prayer hall and its arches, while on its northern side is one of the main entrances to the mosque. From the courtyard the prayer hall can be entered through any of the surrounding arches, but the middle arch on the southern side of the courtyard, opposite the mosque entrance and corresponding to the archway of the central nave leading towards the mihrab, is surrounded by rich carved and painted stucco decoration. Its opening is also covered by an ornate wooden screen with mihrab motifs, called the anaza, which acts as an outdoor or "summer" mihrab for prayers taking place in the courtyard. The anaza is richly carved and has a similar form to the anazas of the Marinid era, such as the one at the Qarawiyyin Mosque in Fes completed in 1290, but it is dated to 1715 and was thus fabricated under the reign of Moulay Ismail.

The exterior of the mosque is largely obscured by the surrounding buildings and the dense urban fabric of the old city. The mosque has 11 gates, and one of the main entrances to the west, called Bab al-Kutub (Gate of the Books), is framed by rich stucco decoration and a canopy of sculpted and painted wood. From above, the mosque is distinguished by its rows of sloped green-tiled roofs, as well as by its large and prominent minaret. The current minaret dates from the reign of the Alawi sultan Moulay Mohammed ben Abdallah (ruled 1757–1790). Like other Moroccan minarets it has a long square shaft which is crowned by stylized merlons and topped by a much smaller and shorter tower, which in turn is topped by an iron finial holding up four golden copper balls. The four facades of the minaret are covered in a surface of gleaming green faience tiles, which are a distinctive trait of minarets in Meknes. Near the base of the minaret, overlooking the courtyard of the mosque, is a dar al-muwaqqit or traditional chamber for the timekeeper of the mosque.

== See also ==
- List of mosques in Morocco
