= Marinid architecture =

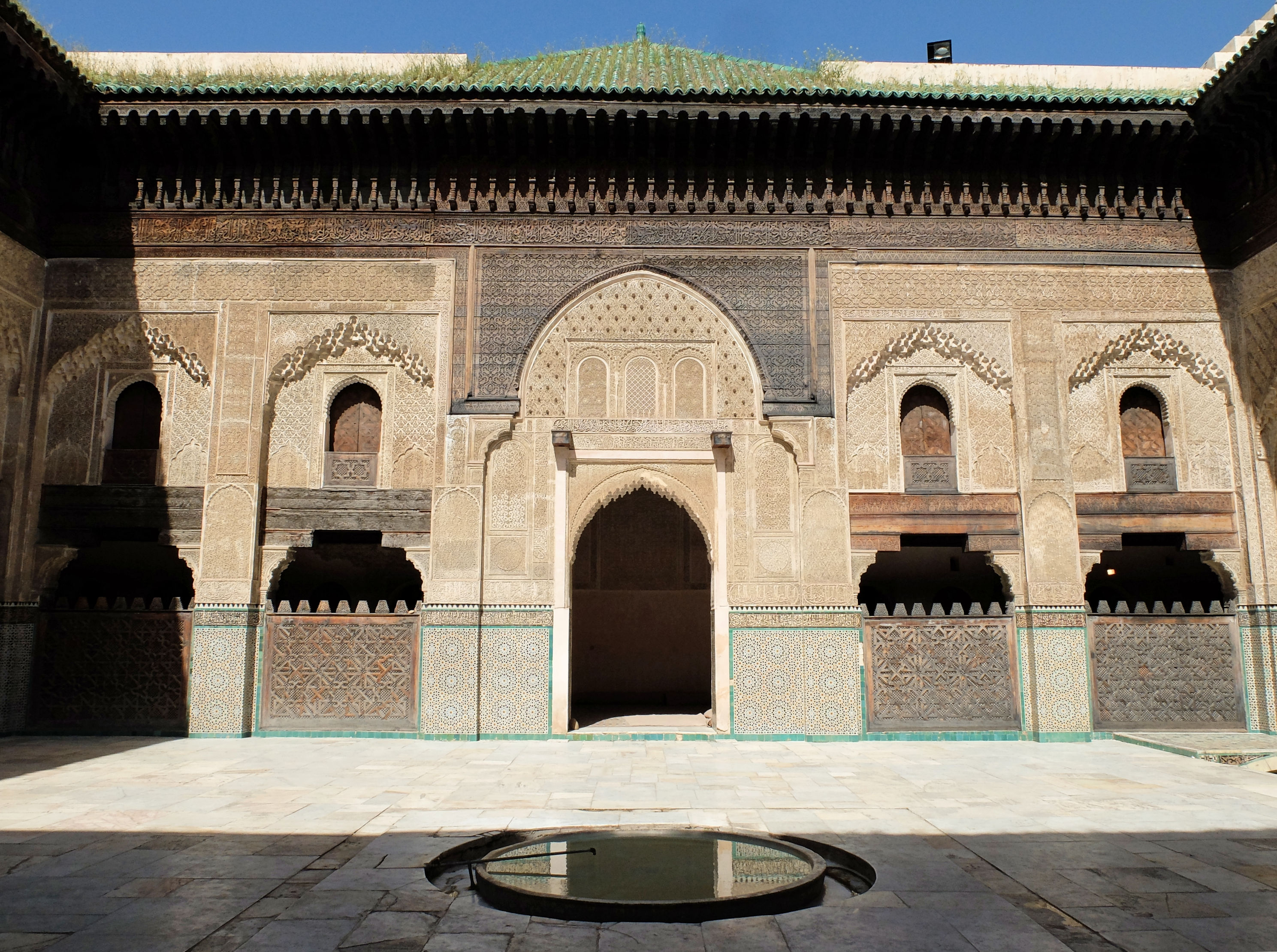
Courtyard of the Marinid-era Bou Inania Madrasa in Fez, Morocco (1350–1355)

Marinid architecture corresponds to a period from the 13th to 15th centuries when the Marinid dynasty ruled over present-day Morocco and, intermittently, parts of present-day western Algeria. Within the wider tradition of western Islamic architecture, Marinid architecture developed from earlier Almohad architecture and is similar to architecture under their contemporary neighboring dynasties, the Nasrids in al-Andalus (present-day Spain) and the Zayyanids to the east (in present-day Algeria).

== Background ==
The Marinid dynasty was important in further refining the artistic legacy established under their Almoravid and Almohad predecessors. Particularly in Fez, their capital, they built monuments with increasingly intricate and extensive decoration, particularly in wood and stucco. The architectural styles of the Marinids, Zayyanids, and Nasrids were very similar to each other. Craftsmen probably travelled between royal courts and from region to region, resulting in mutual influences between the arts of the three kingdoms. Compared with the relatively restrained decoration of Almohad architecture, the monuments of all three dynasties during this period are marked by increasingly extensive and intricate decoration on every surface, particularly in wood, stucco, and zellij (mosaic tilework in complex geometric patterns). Some differences are still found between the styles of each dynasty, such as the increasing use of wooden elements in Marinid architecture.

== Mosques ==
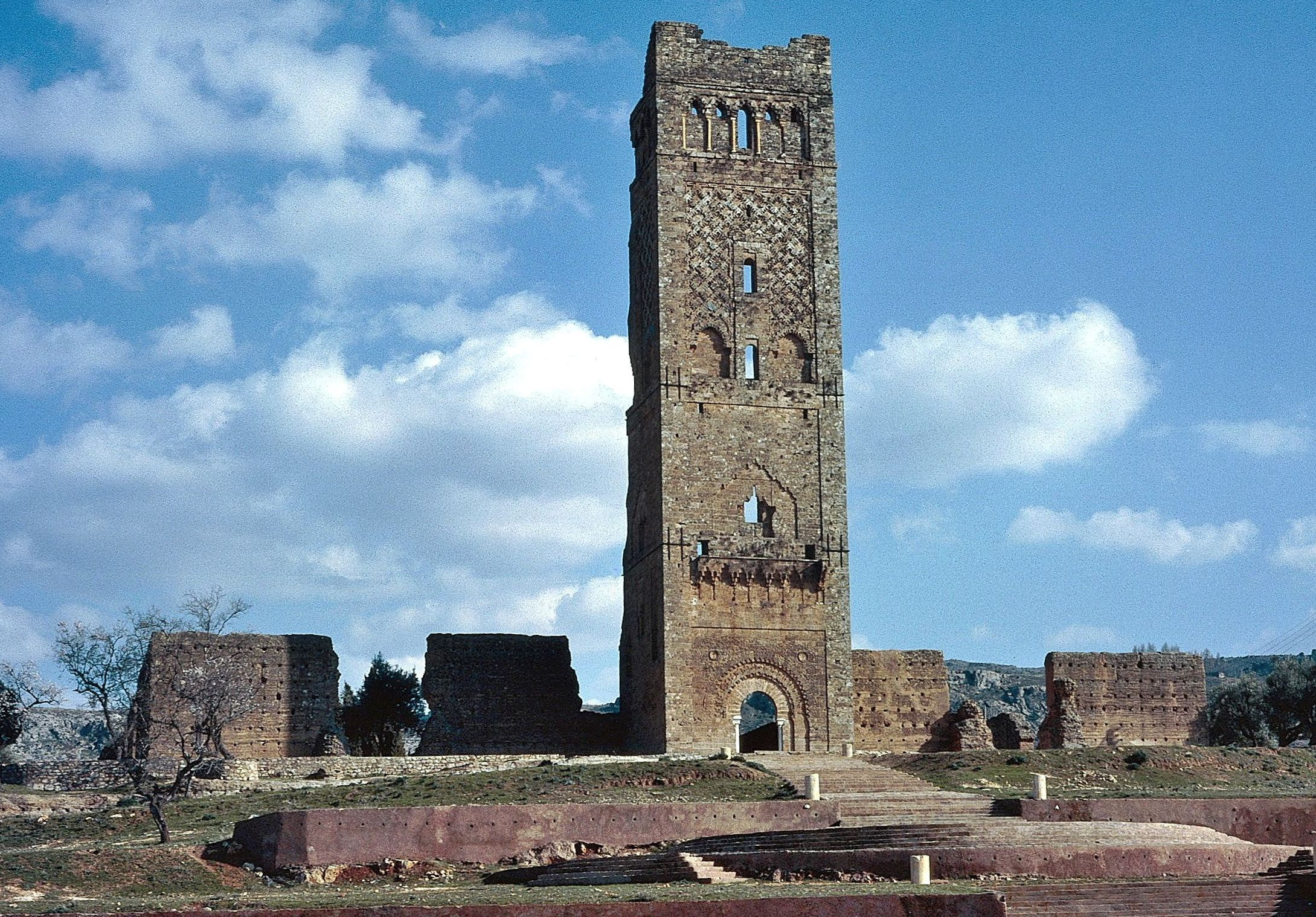
The ruins of the Mosque of Mansourah near Tlemcen, Algeria

While mosque architecture largely followed the Almohad model, one noted change was the progressive increase in the size of the sahn or courtyard, which was previously a minor element of the floor plan but which eventually, in the subsequent Saadian period, became as large as the main prayer hall and sometimes larger. Notable examples of Marinid mosque architecture are the Grand Mosque of Fes el-Jdid (founded in 1276, one of the earliest Marinid mosques), the expansion of the Great Mosque of Taza in 1294, the Mosque of al-Mansourah near Tlemcen (1303), and the Mosque of Sidi Abu Madyan (1338–39). The Ben Salah Mosque in Marrakesh also dates from the Marinid period, one of the few monuments from this period in the city.

== Madrasas ==
The Marinids, who chose Fez as their capital, were also the first dynasty in Morocco to build madrasas, a type of institution which originated in Iran and had spread west. The madrasas of Fez, such as the Bou Inania, al-Attarine, and Sahrij madrasas, as well as the Marinid madrasa of Salé and the other Bou Inania in Meknes, are considered among the greatest architectural works of this period.

== Palaces and gates ==
Of the Marinid royal palaces in Fes el-Jdid little has survived, with the current Royal Palace of Fez dating mainly from the later Alawi period. Likewise, the former Marinid Royal Gardens to the north have disappeared and the complex around the Marinid Tombs on the hills overlooking Fes el-Bali are largely ruined. Excavations in Aghmat, in southern Morocco, have uncovered the remains of a smaller Marinid palace or mansion which has profound resemblances, in terms of its layout, to surviving Nasrid-era palaces in Granada and al-Andalus, demonstrating yet again the shared architectural traditions between the two kingdoms. Further clues about domestic architecture of the period are provided by a few Marinid-era private houses that have been preserved in Fez. They are centered around inner courtyards surrounded by two-story galleries and feature architectural forms and decoration that are highly reminiscent of those found in Marinid madrasas, showing a certain consistency in the decorative techniques across building types. Some Marinid monumental gates, such as the gate of the Chellah necropolis near Rabat and the Bab el-Mrissa in Salé, are still standing today and demonstrate resemblances with earlier Almohad models.

== Funerary architecture ==
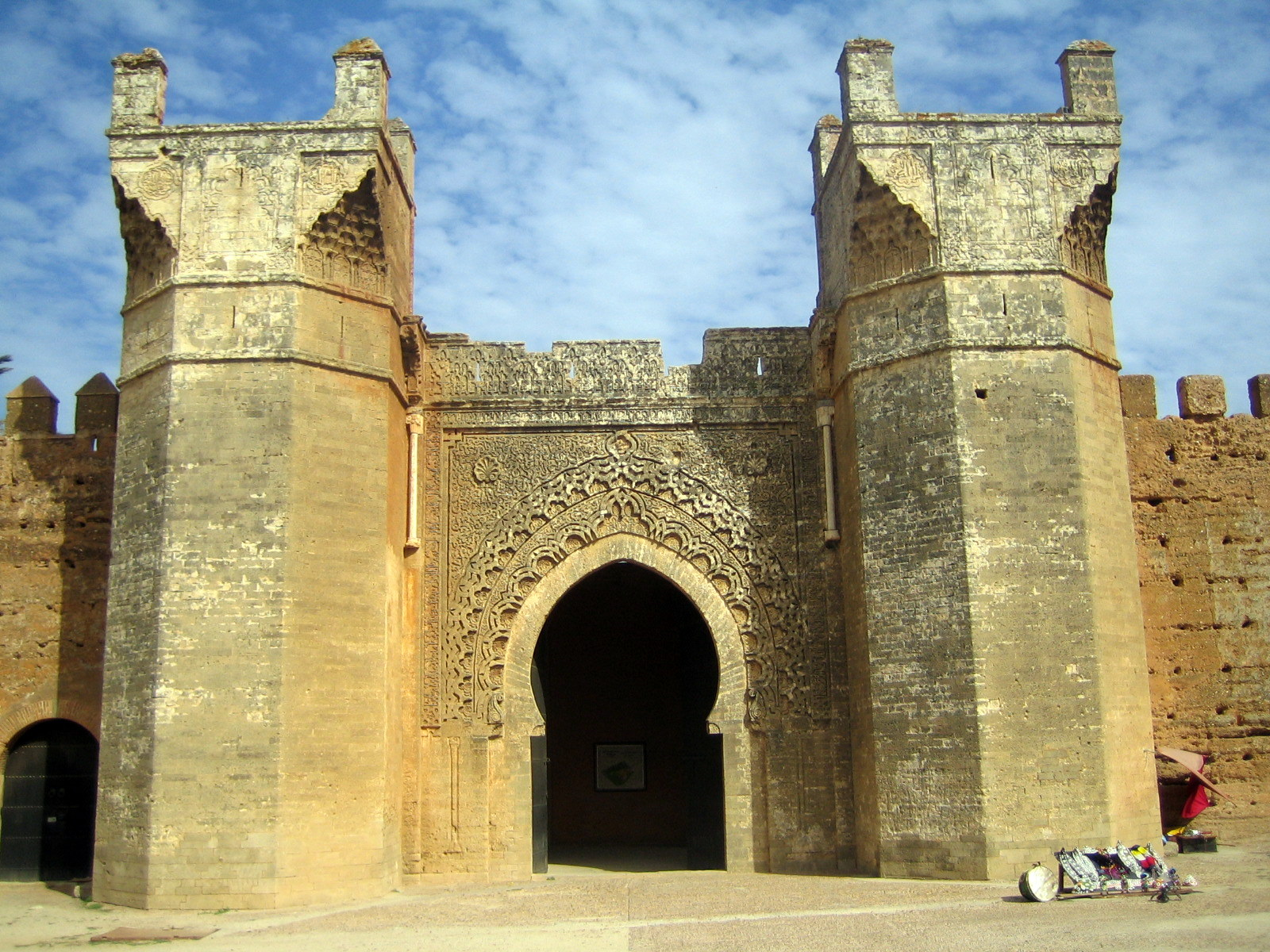
The main gate of Chellah, near Rabat, which became a Marinid necropolis

According to the Rawd al-Qirtas, the founder of the Marinid dynasty, Abu Muhammad Abd al-Haqq I (d. 1217), was buried at a site called Tāfirtāst or Tāfarṭast, a site near Meknes (close to where he fell in battle). Starting with Abu Yusuf Ya'qub (d. 1286), the Marinid sultans began to be buried at a new necropolis in Chellah (the site of the former Roman city called Sala Colonia). Abu Yusuf Ya'qub built a mosque alongside his tomb and that of his wife. Both were qubbas: small square chambers covered by either a dome or a pyramidal roof. They stood in a small garden enclosure or rawda (Arabic: الروضة) at the back of the mosque. The necropolis was surrounded by a set of walls and an ornate monumental gate completed by Abu al-Hasan in 1339. Abu al-Hasan himself was then buried in a small mausoleum which was embellished with exceptional stone-carved low-relief decoration. The mausoleum, along with a madrasa accompanying the funerary complex, was likely completed by his son and successor, Abu Inan. However, Abu Inan himself is believed to have been buried in Fez instead, in a qubba attached to the Great Mosque of Fes el-Jdid. After him, most sultans were buried at the site known as the "Marinid Tombs" to the north of Fes el-Bali. This necropolis seems to have once again consisted of an enclosed garden cemetery inside which stood several qubbas. Though mostly ruined today, Leo Africanus described them in the 16th century as being lavishly decorated. Important Marinid graves in these necropolises were typically surmounted by a maqabriyya, a marble tombstone shaped like a triangular prism, laid horizontally and carved with funerary inscriptions.
