= Anaza =

Architectural element of some mosques

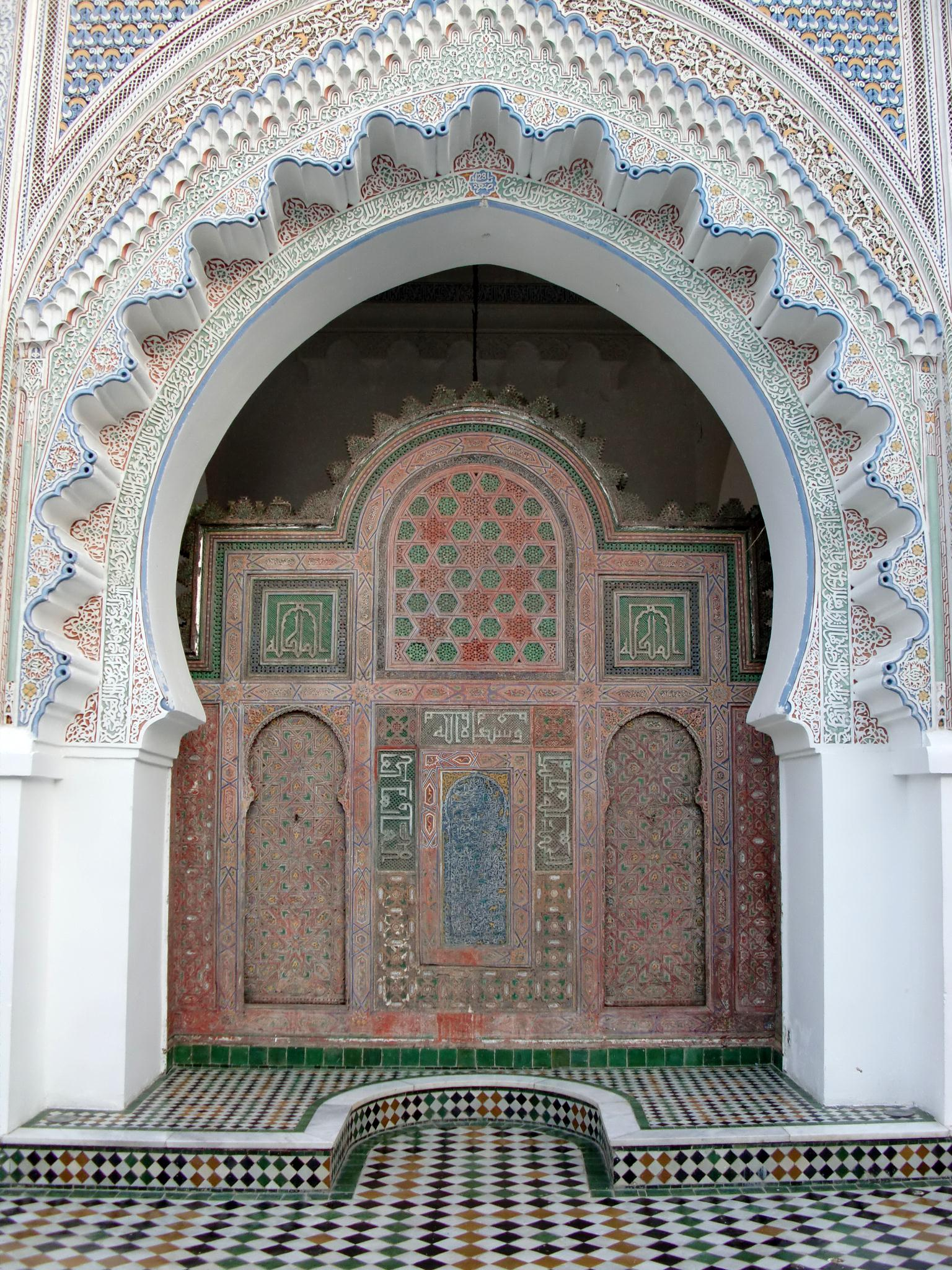
The anaza of the Qarawiyyin Mosque in Fez, dated to 1290 CE

'Anaza or anaza (Arabic: عنزة; sometimes also transliterated as 'anza or anza) is a short spear or staff that held ritual importance in the early period of Islam. The term gained significance after the Islamic prophet Muhammad planted his spear in the ground to indicate the direction of prayer (qibla). Over time, 'anaza evolved into an architectural term denoting an outdoor mihrab in mosques, particularly in the Maghreb region.

== Origins ==
The 'anaza was the spear (also known as a ḥarba) of Muhammad and first appears as part of Muslim ritual in the year 624 CE (2 AH), when Muhammad celebrated the first Eid al-Fitr. When Muhammad and the other Muslims reached the musalla (outdoor prayer space), he planted the spear in the ground and used it to indicate the direction of prayers (the qibla), much like a mihrab would in later mosques. The spear was used in this way again on Eid al-Adha the same year. The early caliphs expanded on this practice, making it customary to carry a staff, sword, or bow on ceremonial occasions when ascending the pulpit (minbar), symbolizing authority. The image of the anaza planted in front of a mihrab arch also appears on some early Umayyad coinage.

== Architectural feature ==
Possibly related to its symbolic use as an early qibla indicator, the term "anaza" later came to refer to an architectural feature found in many mosques in the western Maghreb and Morocco. This architectural element designated an "outdoor" or "summer" mihrab, often takes the form of an ornate wooden screen positioned at the boundary between the sahn (courtyard) and the interior prayer hall of a mosque. It was typically aligned with the central mihrab axis of the mosque. This anaza had the function of serving as a mihrab for prayers conducted in the courtyard. The wooden screen was frequently adorned with intricate carvings and paintings depicting a stylized mihrab motif and other inscriptions. Alternatively, the anaza could be a simple marking on the ground or floor of the courtyard just before the central entrance of the prayer hall, such as a semi-circular groove or recess in the middle of the step leading to the entrance.

Wooden anazas were constructed in mosques across Morocco and the Maghreb. In Morocco they became a standard feature of "grand mosques" or Friday mosques in particular. The oldest surviving example is the anaza of the al-Andalusiyyin Mosque in Fez, which dates from 1209 (from the Almohad period). Historical sources also mention an even older anaza, dating from 1129 (during the Almoravid period), at the Qarawiyyin Mosque in Fez, but it no longer exists today and has been replaced by the current Marinid-era anaza which was fabricated between 1288 and 1290. The anaza in the Grand Mosque of Fes el-Jdid, which likely dates from the mosque's construction in 1276, is very similar and might be the oldest Marinid anaza. A similar example is also found in the Grand Mosque of Meknes but was built much later in 1715 (during the reign of the Alaouite sultan Moulay Ismail). Some other post-Marinid examples also include the anaza of the 16th-century Mouassine Mosque in Marrakesh (from the Saadian period). The anaza of the near-contemporary Bab Doukkala Mosque in Marrakesh, on the other hand, is a modern replacement of the original one.

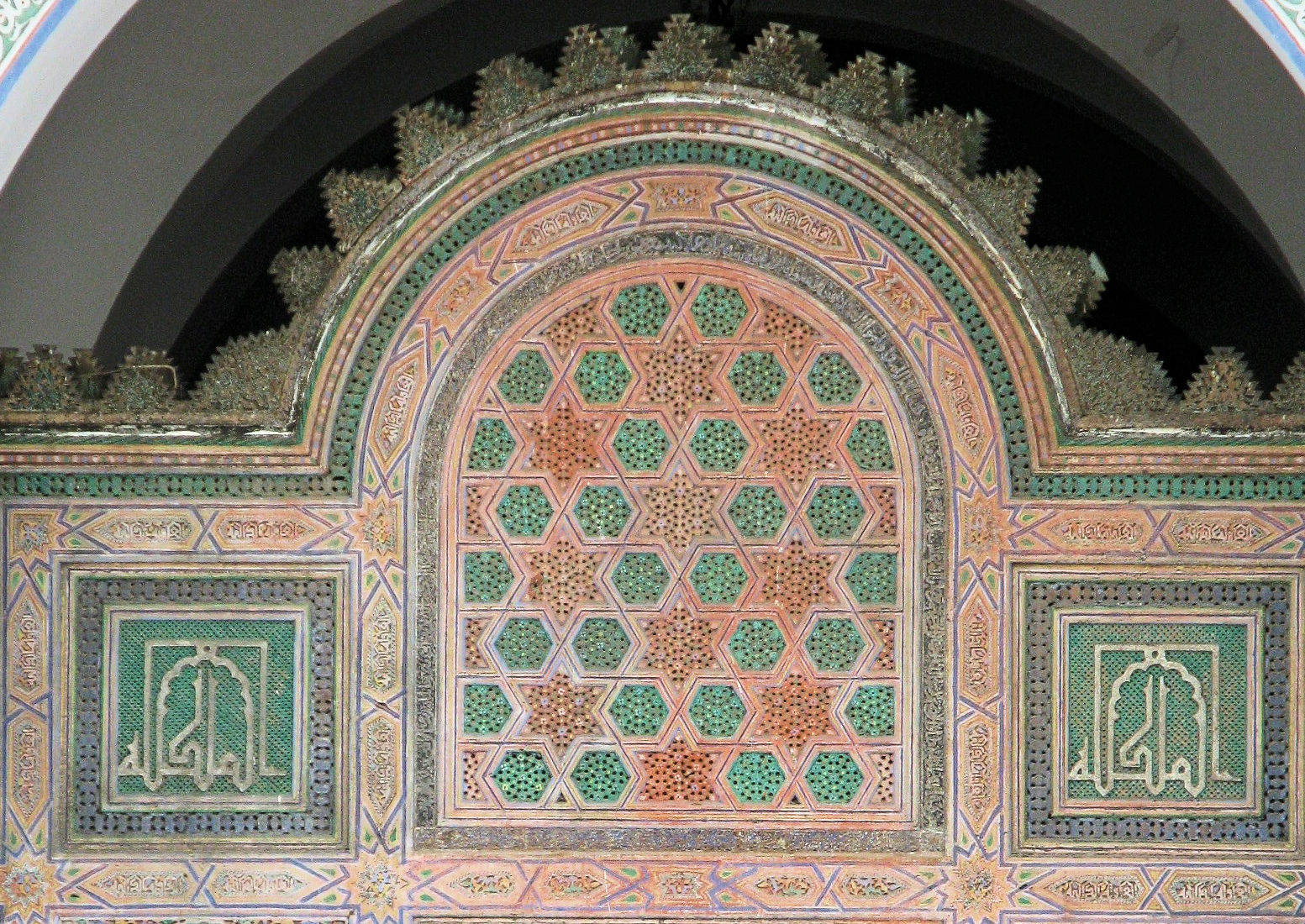
Details of the anaza of the Qarawiyyin Mosque

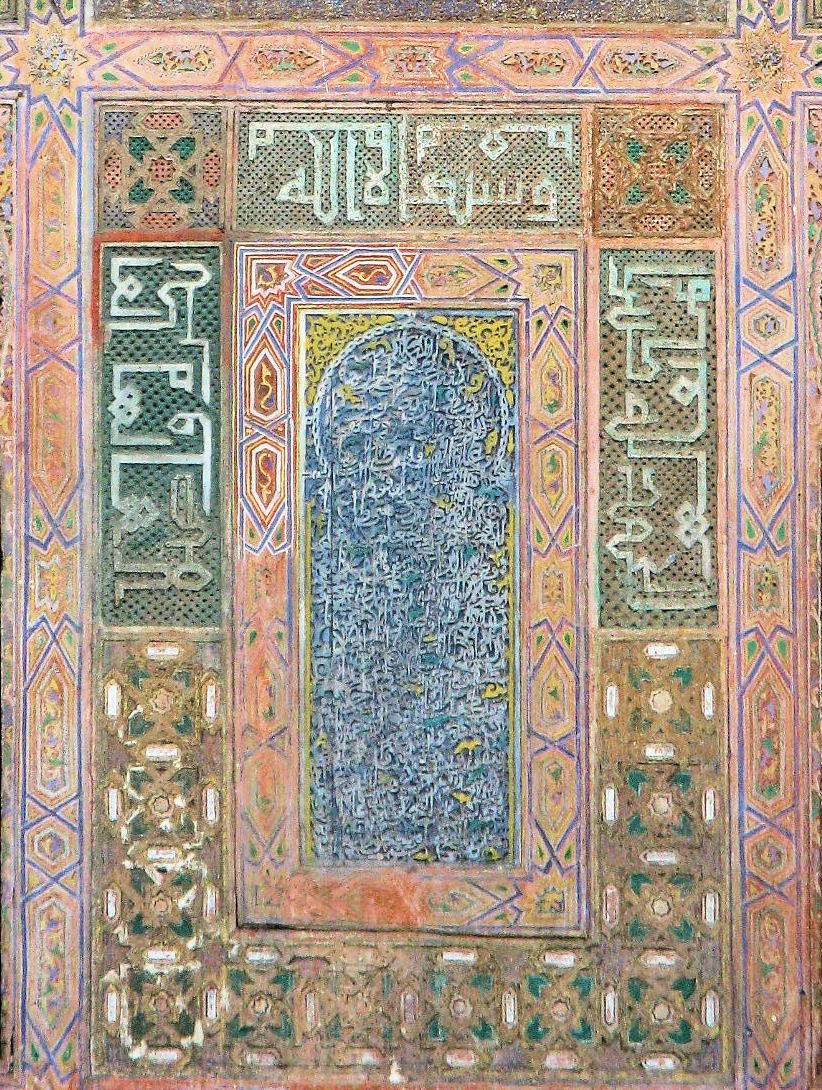
Details of the anaza of the Qarawiyyin Mosque (central lower panel)

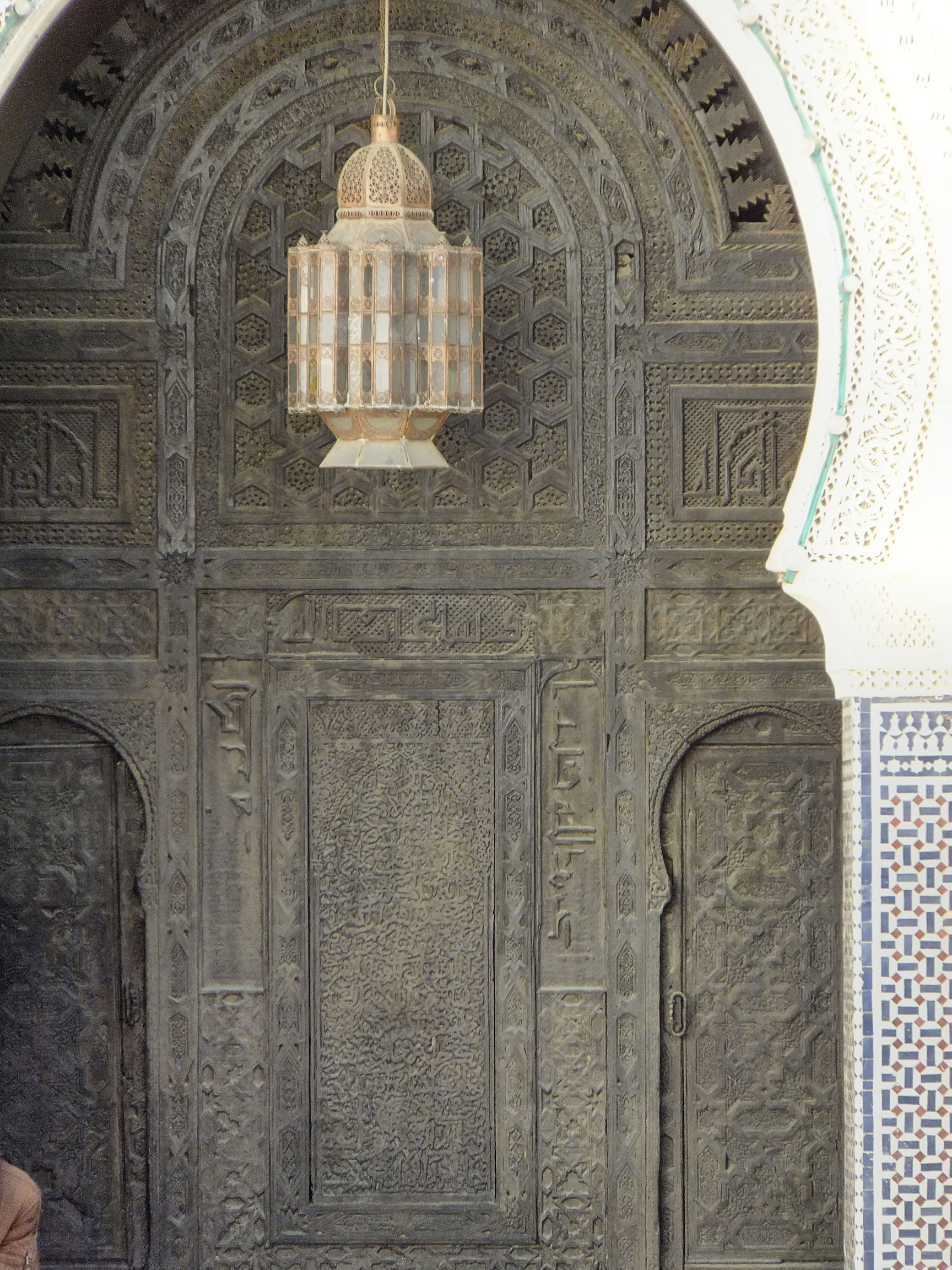
The anaza of the Grand Mosque in Meknes, dating from 1715 but copying the form of earlier Marinid examples
