= Slavery in al-Andalus =

Practice of slavery in Muslim era Spain

Caliphate of Córdoba, cirka 1000

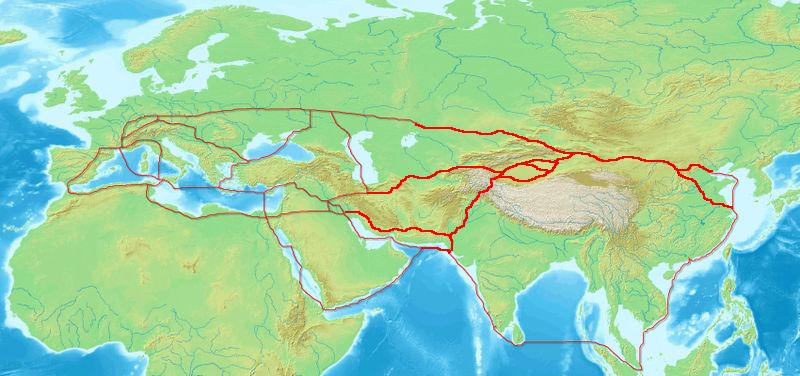
The Radhanite trade routes.

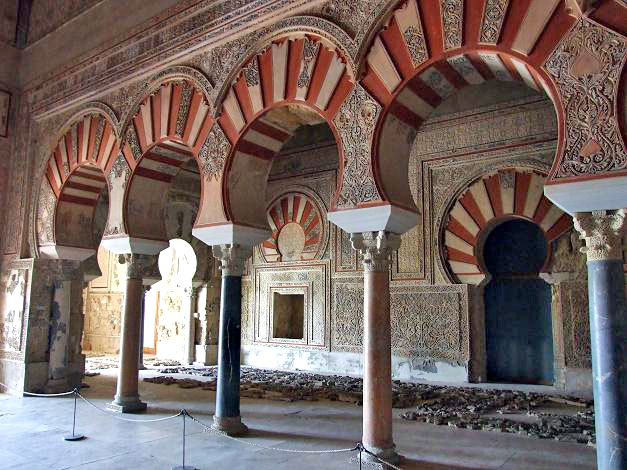
Madinat al-Zahra.

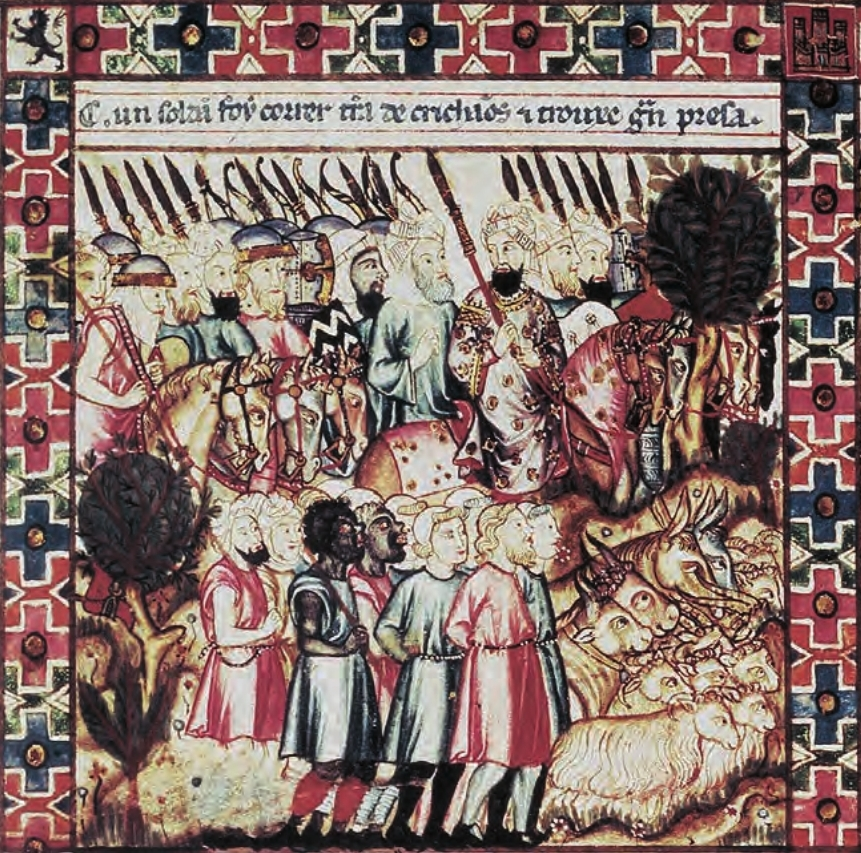
Slavic and Black slaves in Córdoba; illustration from the Cantigas de Santa Maria

Slavery in al-Andalus was a practice throughout Al-Andalus and the Iberian Peninsula (present-day Spain and Portugal) between the 8th century and the 15th century. This includes the periods of the Emirate of Córdoba (756–929), the Caliphate of Córdoba (929–1031), the Taifas (11th century), Almoravid rule (1085–1145), Almohad rule (1147–1238), and the Emirate of Granada (1232–1492).

Slavery in al-Andalus was regulated in accordance with Islamic law. Non-Muslim foreigners were viewed as legitimate targets of enslavement. Since al-Andalus was situated in the religious border zone, it had the conditions necessary to become a center of slave trade between Christian and pagan Europe and the Muslim Middle East.

Slaves were trafficked to al-Andalus via a number of different routes. The centuries long reconquista between Muslim and Christian Iberia resulted in numerous Christian slaves captured during the constant warfare and slave raids across Iberian borders. Christian Europe exported Pagan Europeans as slaves to al-Andalus via the Prague slave trade through Christian France. Pagan Vikings exported Christian slaves captured in Christian Europe to the Muslims in al-Andalus. Muslim Saracen pirates captured and sold Christian Europeans captured in slave raids along the shores of the Mediterranean to the slave markets of al-Andalus. African slaves were trafficked to al-Andalus from the South across the Sahara desert via the trans-Saharan slave trade.

Slaves in al-Andalus were used in a similar manner as in other Muslim states. Female slaves were used primarily as domestic servants, prostitutes and private harem concubines (sex slaves). Male slaves were used for a number of different tasks, but primarily divided into eunuchs, who could be given prestigious tasks; laborers; or as slave soldiers. al-Andalus functioned as both a destination as well as a place of transit of the slave trade of European slaves from the north to the rest of the Muslim world in the south and the east.

== Background ==
Slavery existed in Muslim al-Andalus as well as in the Christian kingdoms, and both sides of the religious border followed the custom of not enslaving people of their own religion. Consequently, Muslims were enslaved in Christian lands, while Christians and other non-Muslims were enslaved in al-Andalus.

The Moors imported white Christian slaves from the 8th century until the end of the Reconquista in the late 15th century. European slaves were exported from the Christian section of Spain as well as Eastern Europe and referred to as Saqaliba. Saqaliba slavery in al-Andalus was especially prominent in the Caliphate of Córdoba, where white female slaves constituted a big part of the slave concubines of the royal harem, and white male slaves constituted most of the administrative personnel in the courts and palaces.

== Slave trade ==
Al-Andalus, the Muslim-ruled area of the Iberian Peninsula (711–1492) imported a large number of slaves to its own domestic market, as well as served as a staging point for Muslim and Jewish merchants to market slaves to the rest of the Islamic world.

An early economic pillar of the Islamic empire in Iberia (Al-Andalus) during the eighth century was the slave trade. Due to manumission being a form of piety under Islamic law, slavery in Muslim Spain couldn't maintain the same level of auto-reproduction as societies with older slave populations. Therefore, Al-Andalus relied on trade systems as an external means of replenishing the supply of enslaved people.

Islamic law prohibited Muslims from enslaving other Muslims, and there was thus a big market for non-Muslim slaves in Islamic territory. The Vikings sold both Christian and pagan European captives to the Muslims, who referred to them as saqaliba; these slaves were likely both pagan Slavic, Finnic and Baltic Eastern Europeans as well as Christian Western Europeans. Forming relations between the Umayyads, Khārijites and 'Abbāsids, the flow of trafficked people from the main routes of the Sahara towards Al-Andalus served as a highly lucrative trade configuration.

The archaeological evidence of human trafficking and proliferation of early trade in this case follows numismatics and materiality of text. This monetary structure of consistent gold influx proved to be a tenet in the development of Islamic commerce. In this regard, the slave trade outperformed and was the most commercially successful venture for maximizing capital. This major change in the form of numismatics serves as a paradigm shift from the previous Visigothic economic arrangement. Additionally, it demonstrates profound change from one regional entity to another, the direct transfer of people and pure coinage from one religiously similar semi-autonomous province to another.

=== Almohad conquest ===
The Almohads broke Islamic law by taking Muslim women and children as slaves during the conquest of the Almoravid Emirate in the 12th century. Islamic law allowed Muslims to take non-Muslims as slaves, but not Muslims. However, the Almohads defined Muslims who were not followers of Almohadism as unbelievers (takfir) and therefore viewed them as legitimate to enslave.

While adult men were killed, women and children were taken captive and sold as slaves and even kept as concubines, something normally only allowed for non-Muslim women. When Abd al-Mu'min took the fortress Dai, two women were taken as captives who became his concubines, one of whom became the mother of his son Abu Said Uthman.

When Tlemcen was taken by the Almohad army, Ibn al-Athir stated that "The children and womenfolk were taken as captives.... Those who were not slain were sold at minimal prices". When the capital Marrakesh was conquered in 1147, al-Baydhaq described how "Everything that was in the city was taken to the treasury. The women were sold and everything [all the booty of the conquest] went back to the treasury", and Ibn Sahib al-Sala that "[Abd al-Mu'min] distributed the houses [of the Marrakeshis] to [the Almohads]. The families of Marrakesh were sold and their children were sold into slavery"

The enslavement of Muslim war captives however soon stopped since during the Almohad conquests, Muslims stated to rapidly adopt the Almohadist version of Islam to avoid enslavement.

=== Prague slave trade ===
The slave market of Prague was one route for saqaliba slaves to al-Andalus. Similarly to al-Andalus, the Duchy of Bohemia was a state in a religious border zone, in the case of Bohemia bordering to Pagan Slavic lands to the North, East and South East.

The Arabic Caliphate of Córdoba referred to the forests of Central and Eastern Europe, which came to function as a slave source supply, as the Bilad as-Saqaliba ("land of the slaves"). Bohemia was in an ideal position to become a supply source for pagan saqaliba slaves to al-Andalus. The slaves were acquired through slave raids toward the pagan Slavic lands north of Prague.

The Prague slave trade adjusted to the al-Andalus market, with females required for sexual slavery and males required for either military slavery or as eunuchs. Male slaves selected to be sold as eunuchs were subjected to castration in Verdun.

Traditionally, the slave traders acquiring the slaves in Prague and transporting them to the slave market of al-Andalus are said to have been dominated by the Jewish Radhanite merchants. How dominating the Jewish merchants were is unknown, but Jewish slave traders did have an advantage toward their non-Jewish colleagues, because they were able to move across Christian and Muslim lands, which was not always to case for Christian and Muslim merchants, and act as mediators between Christian and Muslim commercial markets. While Christians were not allowed to enslave Christians and Muslims not allowed to enslave Muslims, Jews were able to sell Christian slaves to Muslim buyers and Muslim slaves to Christian buyers, as well as pagan slaves to both. In the same fashion, both Christians and Muslims were prohibited from performing castrations, but there was no such ban for Jews, which made it possible for them to meet the demand for eunuchs in the Muslim world.

The slaves were transported to Al-Andalus via France. While the church discouraged the sale of Christian slaves to Muslims, the sale of Pagans to Muslims was not met with such opposition. White European slaves were viewed as luxury goods in Al-Andalus, where they could be sold for as much as 1,000 dinars, a substantial price. The slaves were not always destined for the al-Andalus market; similar to Bohemia in Europe, al-Andalus was a religious border state for the Muslim world, and saqaliba slaves were exported from there further to the Muslim world in the Middle East.

The saqaliba slave trade from Prague to al-Andalus via France became defunct in the 11th century, when the pagan Slavs of the north started to gradually adopt Christianity from the late 10th-century, which prohibited Christian Bohemia from enslaving them to sell to Muslim al-Andalus.

=== Slave raids to Christian Iberia ===
Al-Andalus was described in the Muslim world as the "land of jihad", a religious border land in a state of constant war with the infidels, which by Islamic Law was a legitimate zone for enslavement, and slaves were termed as coming from three different zones in Christian Iberia: Galicians from the northwest, Basques or Vascones from the central north, and Franks from the northeast and France.

The medieval Iberian Peninsula was the scene of episodic warfare among Muslims and Christians. Periodic raiding expeditions were sent from Al-Andalus to ravage the Christian Iberian kingdoms, bringing back booty and people. For example, in a raid on Lisbon in 1189 the Almohad caliph Yaqub al-Mansur took 3,000 female and child captives, and his governor of Córdoba took 3,000 Christian slaves in a subsequent attack upon Silves in 1191.

In the Almohad raid to Evora in Portugal in 1181–82, 400 women were taken captives and put for sale in the slave market of Seville.

These raiding expeditions also included the Sa’ifa (summer) incursions, a tradition produced during the Amir reign of Cordoba. In addition to acquiring wealth, some of these Sa’ifa raids sought to bring mostly male captives, often eunuchs, back to Al-Andalus. They were generically referred to as Saqaliba, the Arab word for Slavs. Slavs’ status as the most common group in the slave trade by the tenth century led to the development of the word “slave.”

During the Sack of Barcelona (985) by the Córdoban general, Almanzor, the entire garrison was slain, and the inhabitants were either killed or enslaved.

=== Saracen piracy ===
Moorish Saracen pirates from al-Andalus attacked Marseille and Arles and established a base in Camargue, Fraxinetum or La Garde-Freinet-Les Mautes (888–972), from which they made slave raids in to France; the population fled in fear of the slave raids, which made it difficult for the Frankish to secure their Southern coast, and the Saracens of Fraxinetum exported the Frankisk prisoners they captured as slaves to the slave market of the Muslim Middle East.

The Saracens captured the Baleares in 903, and made slave raids also from this base toward the coasts of the Christian Mediterranean and Sicily.

While the Saracen bases in France were eliminated in 972, this did not prevent the Saracen piracy slave trade of the Mediterranean; both Almoravid dynasty (1040–1147) and the Almohad Caliphate (1121–1269) approved of the slave raiding of Saracen pirates toward non-Muslim ships in Gibraltar and the Mediterranean for the purpose of slave raiding.

=== Trans-Saharan slave trade ===
Along with Christians and Slavs, sub-Saharan Africans were also held as slaves, brought back from the caravan trade in the Sahara. The ancient trans-Saharan slave trade trafficked slaves to Al-Andalus from non-Muslim pagan sub-Saharan Africa.

Forming relations between the Umayyads, Khārijites and 'Abbāsids, the flow of trafficked people from the main routes of the Sahara towards Al-Andalus served as a highly lucrative trade configuration.

=== Viking slave trade ===
According to Roger Collins, although the role of the Vikings in the slave trade in Iberia remains largely hypothetical, their depredations are clearly recorded. Raids on Al-Andalus by Vikings are reported in the years 844, 859, 966 and 971, conforming to the general pattern of such activity concentrating in the mid ninth and late tenth centuries. Many Arab Muslim women were taken north to the Viking’s homelands as captives.

The Vikings performed slave raids toward the Christian parts of Iberia as well. It is known that the Vikings sold people they captured in their raids in Christian Europe to the Islamic world via Arab merchants in Russia along the Volga trade route, slaves who were trafficked to the Middle East via Central Asia and was an important slave supply source to the Bukhara slave trade. However, it is not confirmed if the Vikings sold the captives from their raids in Christian Iberia directly to Muslim Iberia.

The Vikings did provide slaves to al-Andalus via the Norse Kingdom of Dublin. Slaves captured primarily in the British islands and put on sale in Dublin, which was one of the biggest slave markets in Europe in the 9th- and 11th-centuries, are known to have been sold all over Europe; one of the most lucrative trades for Vikings as well as other traders operating from Irish ports such as Dublin was the slave trade to Islamic Iberia.

== Slave market ==
The slave market in the Muslim world prioritized women for the use of domestic servants and concubines (sex slaves) and men as eunuchs, laborers and slave soldiers. Children were the preferred category on the slave market because they could be trained and raised to fill the function selected for them from childhood. Common slave names were adjusted to the tasks selected for the slave children, such as Mujahid ('warrior'), Muqatil ('fighter') for slave soldiers; or Anbar ('amber'), Zuhayr ('radiant'), Kharyan ('blessing'), wathiq ('trusthworthy') or jumn ('pearl') for bureaucrats.

The slaves of the Caliph were often European saqaliba slaves trafficked from Northern or Eastern Europe. The Saqaliba were mostly assigned to palaces as guards, concubines, and eunuchs, although they were sometimes privately owned. While male saqaliba could be given work in a number of tasks, such as offices in the kitchen, falconry, mint, textile workshops, the administration or the royal guard (in the case of harem guards, they were castrated), female saqaliba were placed in the harem. The Sub-Saharan African Pagans were often given more laborious chores than the saqaliba-slaves.

=== Female slaves ===
In the Islamic world, female slaves were targeted for either use as domestic house slave maidservants, or for sexual slavery in the form of concubinage. In certain Islamic periods such as Al-Andalus, female slaves could also be selected for training as slave artists, known as qiyan.

In the era of slavery in al-Andalus, female slaves were physically examined by matrons employed by the muntashib and categorized as 'distinguished', which meant they were deemd suitable to be sold for sexual slavery or as entertainmers; or as 'gross', which meant they were classified as suited only to be sold as house slaves for household work.

Domestic slavery was a common enslavement for women in the Muslim world. Since free Muslim women were expected to live in gender segregated seclusion in as high degree as possible, they generally did not work as maidservants, which created a high demand for domestic female slaves in the Muslim world.

Female slaves in al-Andalus could also be used as slave artists. The Caliphate of Cordoba continued the tradition of the Umayyad Caliphate to instruct a category of female slaves to become entertainers; qiyan. The female qiyan slave entertainer, often referred to as "singing slave girls", were instructed in a number of accomplishments, such as poetry, music, recitating akhbar (accounts or anecdotes), calligraphy and shadow puppetry.

Qiyan-slave-girls were initially imported to al-Andalus from Medina. Qiyan slave-girls are noted to have been first imported to al-Andalus during the reign of al-Hakam I (r. 796–822). However, qiyan soon started to be trained in Cordoba and from 1013 in Seville; it is however unknown if the tradition was preserved in the Emirate of Granada. Qiyan-slaves were selected to be trained for this function as children, and underwent a long training to fit the demands. During reign of the Caliph al-Amin (r. 809–813) in Baghdad, there was a category known as ghulamyyat, slave-girls dressed as boys, who were trained to perform as singers and musicians and who attended the drinking parties of the sovereign and his male guests, and this custom is known in al-Andalus in the reign of Caliph al-Hakam II (r. 961–976).

In al-Isbahani's Kitab al-Aghani, Ibrahim al-Mawsili noted that originally slave girls with dark complexion had been selected to be trained as qiyan, because they were viewed as unattractive, but that this custom had changed and white slave-girls, who were considered more beautiful and were therefore more expensive, had started to be trained as qiyan to increase their market value even more:

"People did not use to teach beautiful slave-girls to sing, but instead only taught light brown and black [slave girls to sing]. The first person to teach expensive [fair-skinned] slave-girls to sing was my father. He achieved the highest level [of training] of female singers, and thereby raised their value".

The qiyan-slaves were not secluded from men in harem as free women or slave concubines, but in contrast performed for male guests - sometimes from behind a screen and sometimes visible - and are the perhaps most well documented of all female slaves. While trained qiyan-slaves were sexually available to their enslaver, they were not categorized or sold as concubines and, with their training, were the most expensive female slaves.

The writer Al-Jahiz stated that "the singing-girl is hardly ever honest in her passion or sincere in her affection, for she, by training and by disposition, sets traps and snares for her admirers in order that they may plung into her toils [lit. "noose"]", and "for the most part singing-girls are insincere and given to employing deceit and treachery in squeezing out the property of the deluded victim and then abandoning him", and that their enslaver used them to assemble gifts from male guests who came to him to see and hear his qiyan slave-girl.

Another category was that of sexual slavery. Islamic law prohibited a man from having sexual intercourse with any woman except his wife or his female slave. Female slaves were used for both prostitution as well as private concubines. Islamic law formally prohibited prostitution. However, since Islamic law allowed a man to have sexual intercourse with his female slave, prostitution was practiced by a pimp selling his female slave on the slave market to a client, who returned his ownership of her to her former owner (the pimp) on the pretext of discontent after having had intercourse with her, which was a legal and accepted method for prostitution in the Islamic world.

While slaves could be of different ethnicities, this did not exclude enslavers from categorizing slaves by their ethnic origin in to racial stereotypes. Ibn al-Khaṭīb classified female sex slaves by racial stereotypes:

"The Arabic women from the desert [are] well experienced, the houris of paradise with red colors, thin and slim waists, adorned necks, honey-colored lips, big eyes, characteristic perfume suitable for all natures, gentle movements, courteous spirits, kind meanings, dry vulvas, soft kisses, and a straight nose. The Maghribī women, with black hair, a kind face, sweet smile, honey-colored and very red lips with a dark shade, and wrists whose beauty is perfected by mirrors and the indigo drawing of the tattoo. The Christians, of diaphanous whiteness, movable breasts, thin bodies, balanced fat, superb flesh in a narrow build of brocades, bodies and backs embellished with beautiful jewels and gorgeous beads; they stand out for the peculiarity of being foreign and for how they blandish [...]."

The slave traders were known to prepare their slave girls in order to acquire the highest price for them at the slave market. A 12th-century document described how slave traders smeared female slaves of dark complexion with ointments and dyed the hair of brunettes "golden" (blonde) in order to appear lighter, and how they instructed slave girls to flirt to attract buyers. al-Saqati noted how slave traders dressed slave-girls in transparent clothing on public display in order to attract customers and adjusted the color of their clothing, and that white slave-girls, for example, where dressed in rose color (pink).

Female slaves were visible in public; while free Muslim women were expected to veil in public to signal their modesty and status as free women, slave women were expected to appear unveiled in public to differentiate them from free and modest women. Ibn Habib noted how free Muslim women were prohibited from wearing revealing and transparent clothing, but that such clothing was worn in an intimate context; the Libro de los juegos claimed that Muslim women wore transparent tunics, which has been interpreted as the supposed freedom of Andalusian women, but such clothing was likely worn by slave women rather than Muslim women.

The use of female sex slaves of foreign ethnicity had unwanted consequences in the racialized society of al-Andalus, where Arab Muslims were considered to be the most high status ethnicity in the racial hierarchy, followed by Berber Muslims, Christians, Jews and slaves. In order to achieve the status and privileges reserved for ethnic Arabs, such as tax reduction, many Andalusians forged their genealogy to appear pure blood Arab. The fact that the rulers of al-Andalus preferred and could afford to buy white European female sex slaves had the unwanted consequence that many caliphs, who were sons of European slave concubines, became lighter in color for each generation; many caliphs had fair complexion and blue eyes, and dyed their hair black in order to appear more stereotypically Arab.

=== Royal harem ===
The harem system that developed in the Umayyad and Abbasid Caliphate, illustrated by the Abbasid harem, was reproduced by the Islamic realms developing from them, such as in the Emirates and Caliphates in Muslim Spain, Al-Andalus, which attracted a lot of attention in Europe during the Middle Ages until the Emirate of Granada was conquered in 1492.

==== Caliphate of Cordoba ====
The most famous of the Andalusian harems was perhaps the harem of the Caliph of Cordoba. Except for the female relatives of the caliph, the harem women consisted of his slave concubines. The slaves of the caliph were often European saqaliba slaves trafficked from Northern or Eastern Europe. While male saqaliba could be given work in a number offices such as: in the kitchen, falconry, mint, textile workshops, the administration or the royal guard (in the case of harem guards, they were castrated), but female saqaliba were placed in the harem.

The harem could contain thousands of slave concubines; the harem of Abd al-Rahman I consisted of 6,300 women. The saqaliba concubines were appreciated for their light skin. The concubines (jawaris) were educated in accomplishments to make them attractive and useful for their master, and many became known and respected for their knowledge in a variety of subjects from music to medicine. A jawaris concubine who gave birth to a child acknowledge by her enslaver as his attained the status of an umm walad, and a favorite concubine was given great luxury and honorary titles such as in the case of Marjan, who gave birth to al-Hakam II, the heir of Abd al-Rahman III; he called her al-sayyida al-kubra (great lady).

However, concubines were always slaves subjected the will of their master. Caliph Abd al-Rahman III is known to have executed two concubines for reciting what he saw as inappropriate verses, and tortured another concubine with a burning candle in her face while she was restrained by two eunuchs after she refused sexual intercourse. The concubines of Abu Marwan al-Tubni (d. 1065) were reportedly so badly treated that they conspired to murder him; women of the harem were also known to have been subjected to rape when rivaling factions conquered different palaces. Several concubines were known to have had great influence through their masters or their sons, notably Subh during the Caliphate of Cordoba, and Isabel de Solís during the Emirate of Granada.

==== Emirate of Granada ====
The Royal Nasrid Harem of the Emirate of Granada (1238–1492) was modelled after the former Royal Harem of Cordoba. The rulers of the Nasrid dynasty normally married their cousins, (al-hurra), who became their legal wives (zawŷ), but additionally bought enslaved concubines (ŷawārī, mamlūkāt); the concubines were normally Christian girls (rūmiyyas) kidnapped in slave raids to the Christian lands in the North. A concubine who gave birth to a child who was recognized by her enslaver as his, was given the status of ummahāt al-awlād, which meant she could no longer be sold and would be free (hurra) after the death of her enslaver. The mothers of both Yusuf I and Muhammad V had been captured Christian women, as had Rīm, enslaved by Yusuf I of Granada, and mother of Ismail II of Granada.

=== Male slaves ===
In the Islamic world, male slaves could be used for a number of chores, but the main tasks were two. Either they were targeted for military slavery as slave soldiers; or they were subjected to castration and selected to serve in administration in or outside of the harem, tasks for which they were expected to be eunuchs.

Male slave children were normally taught Arabic and converted to Islam, and then selected to be trained in a future function chosen for them.

Non-castrated male children could be selected for military slavery: slave soldiers were an important part of Andalusian military. Free Arab soldiers were distrusted by the Islamic rulers and the custom of having a slave army is known in al-Andalus from at least Caliph Abd al-Rahman III's reign; as slaves, they were seen as more trustworthy, being dependent on the protective patronage of the ruler. The Caliph al-Hakam (r. 796–822) are known to have had a personal guard of "mutes" slave soldiers, called mute because they were not taught Arabic and thus unable to communicate.

A ready market, especially for men of fighting age, could be found in Umayyad Spain, with its need for supplies of new mamelukes.

Al-Hakam was the first monarch of this family who surrounded his throne with a certain splendour and magnificence. He increased the number of mamelukes (slave soldiers) until they amounted to 5,000 horse and 1,000 foot. ... he increased the number of his slaves, eunuchs and servants; had a bodyguard of cavalry always stationed at the gate of his palace and surrounded his person with a guard of mamelukes .... these mamelukes were called Al-haras (the Guard) owing to their all being Christians or foreigners. They occupied two large barracks, with stables for their horses.

During the reign of Abd-ar-Rahman III (912–961), there were at first 3,750, then 6,087, and finally 13,750 Saqaliba, or Slavic slaves, at Córdoba, capital of the Umayyad Caliphate. Ibn Hawqal, Ibrahim al-Qarawi, and Bishop Liutprand of Cremona note that the Jewish merchants of Verdun specialized in castrating slaves, to be sold as eunuch saqaliba, which were enormously popular in Muslim Spain.

Male children could be trained to fill numerous domestic and other tasks, such as being in charge of offices of the Palace kitchen, the falconry, mint, and textile workshops, and in the libraries; the brother of the slave concubine Subh are known to have been placed in the Royal workshop. Male children could also be selected to be trained to serve the diwan as administrative state bureaucrat offices.

Castrated children could be selected to serve as guards or other functions inside a harem.

== See also ==
- Radhanite
- Tribute of 100 virgins
- Slavery in the Abbasid Caliphate
- Slavery in the Umayyad Caliphate
- Crimean slave trade
- Barbary slave trade
- History of slavery in the Muslim world
- History of concubinage in the Muslim world
- Medieval Arab attitudes to Black people
