= Rīm (concubine) =

Slave concubine of Yusuf I of Granada

- Died: 24 June or 13 July 1360; Alhambra, Granada
- Consort of: Yusuf I of Granada
- Issue: Ismail II of Granada; Qays; Fatima; Mu’mina; Jadīŷa; Shams; Zaynab
- House: Nasrid

Rīm, also called Maryam or Maryem (died 1360), was a consort of Yusuf I of Granada, and the mother of Ismail II of Granada.

== Early life and concubinage ==
Her origin and her original name is unknown. The Nasrid rulers of the Emirate of Granada customarily married their cousins, but also kept slave concubines in accordance with Islamic custom. The identity of these concubines is unknown, but they were originally Christian women (rūmiyyas) bought or captured in expeditions in the Christian states of Northern Spain, and given a new name when they entered the royal Nasrid harem.

Rīm was given her name when she entered the royal harem at an unknown date before 1338; Modern authors identify her with two possible names: Antonio Fernandez-Puertas and Francisco Vidal Castro name her "Maryam" (مريم) while Bárbara Boloix Gallardo names her "Rīm" (ريم). Boloix Gallardo argues that the name Maryam is a misreading of the Arabic texts: in the Arabic script, bi-Rīm (بريم, "by Rīm") appears very similar to Maryam (مريم), only differing by a single letter.

Rīm was described as Yusuf's favorite, and reportedly tried to convince Yusuf I to appoint her son as his successor.

== Later life and politics ==
When Yusuf I died in 1354, a power struggle outside of the harem ended with the chief minister placing Butayna's son on the throne as Muhammad V of Granada. Having given birth to her enslaver's children, Rīm was manumitted when Yusuf I died in accordance with the umm walad law, though as a free Muslim woman she still had to observe seclusion. Her stepson Muhammad V had his stepmother Rīm and her daughters removed from the royal harem and banished to a separate harem. Before she left, Rīm obtained a substantial sum of money from the royal treasury, which had been situated in the harem and not sufficiently guarded in the events following the death of the sultan.

Rīm married her daughter to her son's cousin prince Muhammad, and staged a coup d'état with her son-in-law financed by the money she had obtained from the treasury. In August 1359, Rīm and her son-in-law deposed Muhammad V and placed Rīm's son on the throne as Ismail II of Granada. Rīm became the mother of the sultan and thus had the highest rank in the royal harem. In 1360, however, her son-in-law deposed her son, took the throne as Muhammad VI and had Ismail II and his mother Rīm executed. Muhammad VI himself was to be overthrown in 1362, when Muhammad V returned from exile with his mother and reclaimed his throne.

== Issue ==
With Yusuf Rīm became the mother of two sons and three daughters

- Ismail II of Granada (4 October 1339 - 24 June or 13 July 1360) ruled for brief time from 1359 to 1360, executed alongside his mother.
- Qays (died 24 June or 13 July 1360) executed alongside Ismail
- Fatima
- Mu’mina
- Jadīŷa
- Shams
- Zaynab

== In fiction ==
=== Novel ===
The novel series Sultana: Two Sisters och Sultana: The Bride Price by Lisa J. Yarde focus on the dynamic between Maryem (Rīm) and Butayna.

== See also ==
- Umm al-walad

== Sources ==
- Boloix Gallardo, Bárbara (2013). Las sultanas de la Alhambra: las grandes desconocidas del reino nazarí de Granada (siglos XIII–XV) (in Spanish). Granada: Patronato de la Alhambra y del Generalife. ISBN 978-8490450451.
- Fernández-Puertas, Antonio (April 1997). "The Three Great Sultans of al-Dawla al-Ismā'īliyya al-Naṣriyya Who Built the Fourteenth-Century Alhambra: Ismā'īl I, Yūsuf I, Muḥammad V (713–793/1314–1391)". Journal of the Royal Asiatic Society. Third Series. 7 (1). London: Cambridge University Press on behalf of Royal Asiatic Society of Great Britain and Ireland: 1–25. doi:10.1017/S1356186300008294. JSTOR 25183293. S2CID 154717811.
- Vidal Castro, Francisco. "Yusuf I". Diccionario Biográfico electrónico (in Spanish). Real Academia de la Historia.
