= Abu Nu'aym Ridwan =

Abu Nu'aym Ridwan (or Abu al-Nu'aym Ridwan) was a minister and military commander in the Emirate of Granada. Born a Christian with Castilian and Catalan origin, he was captured as a child in Calatrava and brought as a slave to the palace. He converted to Islam and rose through the ranks during the reign of Ismail I (r. 1314–1325), eventually appointed as a tutor to the sultan's son Muhammad. When the latter became Sultan Muhammad IV at the age of ten, Ridwan remained in charge of him and acted as a sort of regent together with the Sultan's grandmother Fatima bint al-Ahmar. Muhammad appointed him as the hajib in 1329, making him the highest-ranking minister at court. He remained in this position during the reign of Muhammad's successor Yusuf I and the first reign (1354–1359) of Muhammad V, except for a brief pause during Yusuf's rule. He was killed during a coup that deposed Muhammad V in 1359.
