= Ismail II of Granada =

Sultan of Granada from 1359 to 1360

Ismail II

Sultan of Granada
- Reign: 23 August 1359 – 24 June/13 July 1360
- Predecessor: Muhammad V
- Successor: Muhammad VI
- Born: 4 October 1339; Alhambra, Granada
- Died: 24 June or 13 July 1360; Alhambra, Granada
Names
- أبو الوليد إسماعيل بن يوسف; Abu al-Walid Ismail ibn Yusuf
- Dynasty: Nasrid
- Father: Yusuf I
- Mother: Maryam
- Religion: Islam

Abu al-Walid Ismail II ibn Yusuf (أبو الوليد إسماعيل بن يوسف, 4 October 1339 – 24 June or 13 July 1360) was the ninth Nasrid ruler of the Emirate of Granada on the Iberian Peninsula. He reigned from 23 August 1359 until his death.

The second son of Yusuf I, he was initially the favourite of his father due to the influence of his mother Maryam, of whom he was the first son. His half-brother Muhammad V succeeded in 1354 after their father's assassination, and Ismail lived in a palace provided by the new Sultan. He dethroned his half-brother on 23 August 1359 in a coup that was masterminded by his mother Maryam and his brother-in-law Muhammad el Bermejo. With Muhammad V exiled in North Africa, Ismail's rule came to be dominated by el Bermejo. They had a falling-out, which resulted in the violent overthrow of Ismail by his brother-in-law after less than a year as sultan. Ismail was executed along with his brother Qays and his ministers.

== Geopolitical background ==
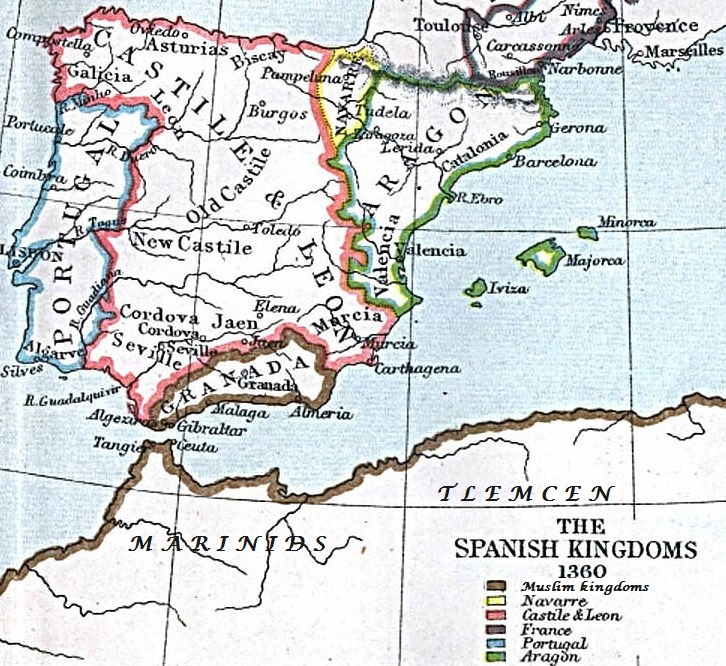
Granada and the surrounding kingdoms in the 14th century

The Emirate of Granada was the last Muslim state on the Iberian Peninsula, founded by Muhammad I in the 1230s. Through a combination of diplomatic and military manoeuvres, the emirate succeeded in maintaining its independence, despite being located between two larger neighbours: the Christian Crown of Castile to the north and the Muslim Marinid Sultanate in Morocco. Granada intermittently entered into alliance or went to war with both of these powers, or encouraged them to fight one another, in order to avoid being dominated by either. From time to time, the sultans of Granada swore fealty and paid tribute to the kings of Castile, an important source of income for Castile. From Castile's point of view, Granada was a royal vassal, while Muslim sources never described the relationship as such.

Muhammad IV allied himself with the Marinid Sultanate against Castile, and Ismail's father, Yusuf I, continued this diplomatic policy early in his reign. However, after the disastrous Battle of Río Salado in 1340, he cautiously avoided confrontation and focused on the independent defense of his realm. Castile, Granada, and the Marinids agreed to a peace treaty between the three kingdoms in 1350.

== Early life ==
The family tree of Ismail and his brother Muhammad V and brother-in-law Muhammad VI

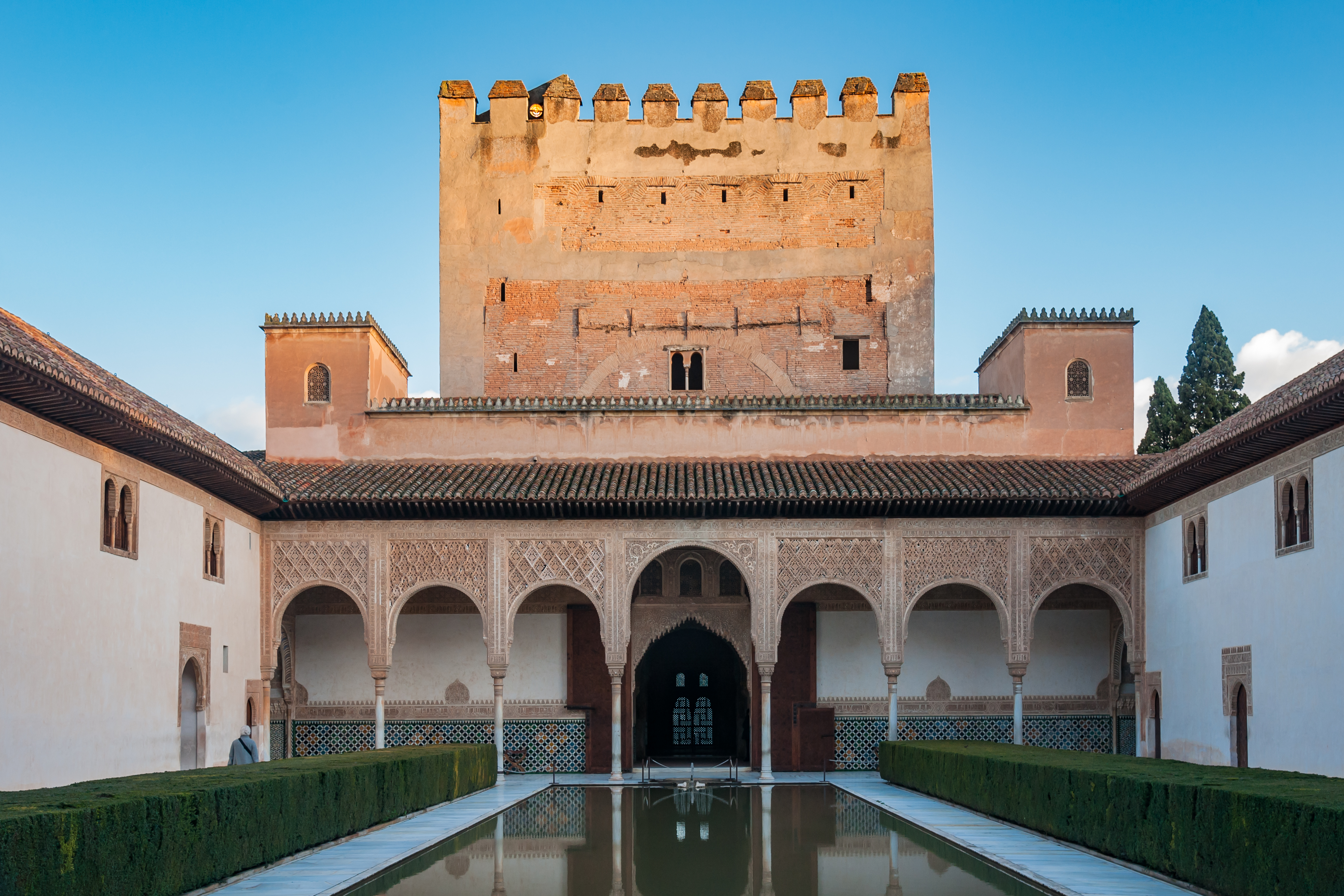
One of the palaces of the Alhambra, the Nasrid royal compound

Abu al-Walid Ismail ibn Yusuf was born on 4 October 1339 (28 Rabi al-Awwal 740 AH). His father was Sultan Yusuf I and his mother was the Sultan's concubine Maryam. He was the second son of his father, born nine months after Muhammad, the first son of another concubine, Buthayna. Ismail had at least three younger full siblings: his brother Qays and sisters Shams and Zaynab. Other than Muhammad, he had a half-sister Aisha, also a child of Buthayna. Maryam seems to have had more influence over the Sultan than Buthayna, and Ismail was also his favourite son. Yusuf's hajib (chamberlain), Abu Nu'aym Ridwan, was responsible for the education of Ismail and the other princes. Ismail learned some Greek from the Ridwan, who was a former Christian. The Nasrid dynasty did not have a predetermined order of succession; initially, Yusuf designated Ismail as his heir, but, a few days before his death, he named Muhammad instead.

Yusuf I was assassinated during prayer in the Great Mosque of Granada on Eid al-Fitr, 19 October 1354. To Maryam's and Ismail's disappointment, the vizier Ibn al-Khatib immediately declared Muhammad (now Muhammad V) as the next Sultan. Due to Muhammad's young age, the government and the army were controlled by Ridwan, who still held the guardianship of Muhammad, Ismail, and their siblings. Ismail, Maryam, and his full siblings lived in a palace assigned to them by Muhammad and located in the Alhambra, the Nasrid royal compound, near the Sultan's own palace. Their movements were restricted but they lived comfortably and were treated with dignity and generosity.

Muhammad continued the policy of peace with all neighbours, and had good relations with both Abu Salim of the Marinids (r. 1359–1361) and Peter I of Castile. However, in 1358, he was embroiled in the War of the Two Peters between Peter I and Peter IV of Aragon. Castile demanded Granada's financial and military contributions as its vassal. Muhammad's decision to enter the war angered many at court and was one factor that facilitated Ismail's rise to the throne.

== Reign ==
The Emirate of Granada, with relevant towns and cities

Ismail came to the throne on 23 August 1359 (28 Ramadan 760) in a coup masterminded and financed by his mother Maryam and supported by his father's cousin Abu Abdullah Muhammad—called el Bermejo, "the Red-haired"—who was also his brother-in-law, as he had married one of his full sisters several years before. Under cover of the night in the holy month of Ramadan, one hundred men scaled the Alhambra's walls and overwhelmed the guards. They killed the hajib Ridwan, demolished his house, and took his rich possessions. Muhammad V happened to be outside the Alhambra, and fled to the eastern city of Guadix after failing to retake the palace compound. The conspirators found Ismail in his assigned palace and declared him as the new Sultan. However, soon much actual power was held by his brother-in-law el Bermejo, who as high-ranking royalty was customarily titled al-rais (arráez).

Muhammad V's authority was recognised in Guadix, and he was supported by the commander of the Volunteers of the Faith garrisoned there, Ali ibn Badr ibn Rahhu. However, the dethroned sultan failed to gain the loyalty of the eastern port of Almería or to secure help from his ally Peter I of Castile. He then left the Iberian Peninsula for North Africa after he was offered asylum by the Marinid Sultan Abu Salim. He sailed from the western port of Marbella to Ceuta, and thence to the Marinid capital of Fez on either 28 October 1359 or 4 November 1359 along with his retinue, his vizier Ibn al-Khatib—whom Ismail agreed to release—and his katib (secretary) Ibn Zamrak.

Ismail replaced many of the Granadan high officials known or suspected to be loyal to his predecessor. He appointed Ibn al-Hasan al-Nubahi as the chief judge (qadi al-jama'a), replacing Ibn Juzayy, one of the most celebrated men in the city, whom Ismail suspected of supporting Muhammad V. Ismail appointed Idris ibn Uthman ibn al-Ula as the Chief of the Volunteers in Granada. His predecessor, Yahya ibn Umar ibn Rahhu, remained loyal to Muhammad V and fled to Castile, along with 200 of his cavalry. Yahya was given asylum in Cordoba until he joined the Sultan-in-exile in 1361.

=== Downfall and death ===
With a civil war averted, Ismail renewed his predecessor's alliance with Castile against Aragon. In response, Peter IV of Aragon sent Granadan knights in his service to Granada in an attempt to destabilise Ismail's reign. Ibn al-Khatib, one of the main historical sources on Granada in this period, wrote in his al-Lamha al-Badriyya that Ismail—whom he nicknamed al-Mutawattib ("the Usurper")—was a weak, lazy, and effeminate ruler, who braided his hair with silk to below his waist and lacked any personal quality. Historian L. P. Harvey commented that this negative portrayal might have been biased by Ibn al-Khatib's allegiance to Muhammad V. In any event, el Bermejo increasingly held the real power, to the extent that Ismail began to oppose his brother-in-law.

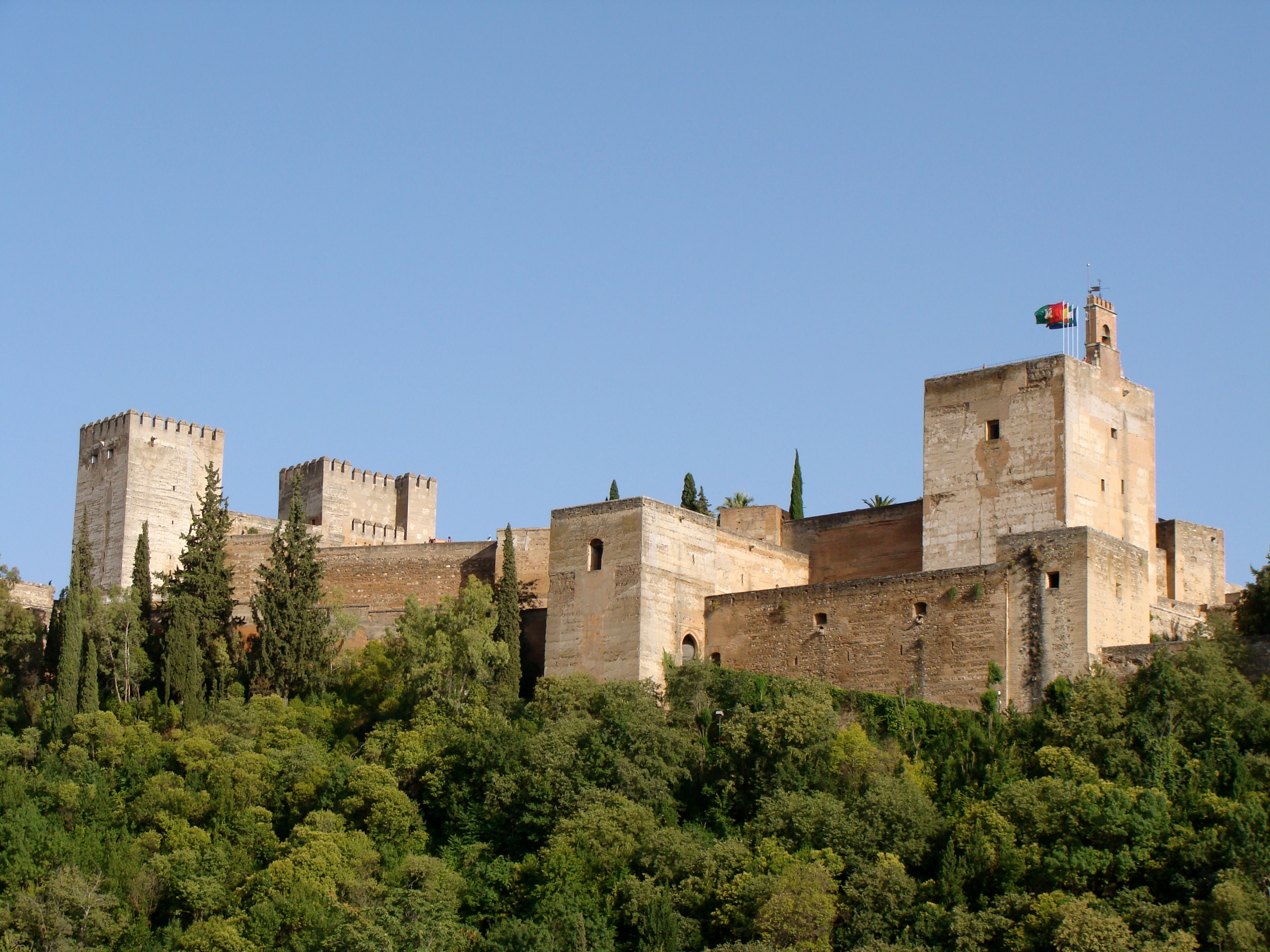
Ismail was surrounded by Muhammad VI's men and likely barricaded himself in one of the towers of the Alhambra's alcazaba (pictured), before he surrendered and was executed.

Before Ismail could act, el Bermejo mounted a second coup, which resulted in his own accession and the dethronement of Ismail, either on 24 June 1360 (8 Shaban 761) or the night of 13 July (27 Shaban). Ismail was surrounded by el Bermejo's men and barricaded himself in a tower overlooking the capital, likely one of the towers in the Alcazaba of the Alhambra. Forced to surrender, he offered to live in seclusion, but el Bermejo took him to a dungeon, where he was executed. Next, el Bermejo found Ismail's brother Qays, who was still a child, and executed him, too. Both their bodies were dumped in public covered only with rags. Ismail's ministers were also executed. According to historian Francisco Vidal Castro, el Bermejo's actions were motivated by fear that either royal could be used in a future court intrigue against him, as Ismail had been used to dethrone Muhammad V. Thus, el Bermejo took the throne as Muhammad VI. The next day, the bodies of Ismail and Qays were recovered and they were buried in the rawda (royal cemetery) of the Alhambra, next to their father Yusuf I.

== Aftermath and succession ==
The reign of Muhammad VI (el Bermejo) did not last long: Muhammad V returned from North Africa on August 1361, set up a rival government in Ronda, and deposed his brother-in-law in March 1362. Muhammad VI threw himself at the mercy of Peter I, an ally of Muhammad V. Peter refused to give asylum to the dethroned Sultan and instead personally executed him in Seville on 25 April 1362. Muhammad V went on to rule until his natural death on 16 January 1391. His relatively long reign is considered one of the highest points of the Nasrid dynasty, together with the reign of Yusuf I before him.

Ismail II of Granada Nasrid dynasty Cadet branch of the Banu Khazraj Born: 1338 Died: 1360
Regnal titles
Preceded by Muhammad V	Sultan of Granada; 1359–1360	Succeeded by Muhammad VI
