= Muhammad VI of Granada =

Sultan of Granada (1332–1362)

Muhammad VI

Sultan of Granada
- Reign: June/July 1360 – April 1362
- Predecessor: Ismail II
- Successor: Muhammad V
- Born: 1333; Granada (presumed)
- Died: 25 April 1362 (aged 28–29); Tablada, near Seville
Names
- أبو عبد الله محمد بن إسماعيل; Abu Abdullah Muhammad ibn Ismail
- Dynasty: Nasrid
- Father: Ismail ibn Abdullah
- Religion: Islam

Abu Abdullah Muhammad VI ibn Ismail (Arabic: أبو عبد الله محمد بن إسماعيل, 1332 – 27 April 1362), also known by his Castilian nickname el Bermejo ("The Red One"), and the regnal names al-Ghālib bi 'llāh (Arabic: الغالب بالله, lit. 'Victor by the Grace of God') and al-Mutawakkil ʿalā 'llāh (Arabic: المتوكل على الله, lit. 'He who relies on God'), was the tenth Sultan of the Emirate of Granada. A member of the Nasrid dynasty, he ruled for a brief period between June or July 1360 and April 1362.

A second cousin and brother-in-law of both Muhammad V and Ismail II, Muhammad VI led a coup that deposed the former and enthroned the latter in August 1359. He increasingly held the power of government during Ismail's rule, and in June or July 1360 he had the new Sultan killed and took the throne to himself. Muslim chronicles portrayed him negatively, describing him as a tyrannical ruler with coarse manners. In October 1360, he allied himself with Peter IV of Aragon against Peter I of Castile in the War of the Two Peters, but had to face Castile alone when Aragon agreed to a separate peace in May 1361. Castile allied itself with Muhammad V, who returned from exile in August. The war against this coalition began with partial successes for Muhammad VI, but from February 1362 onwards, Peter I and Muhammad V won a string of major victories. On 13 April Muhammad VI fled Granada, allowing his rival to retake the throne. The desperate Muhammad VI then unexpectedly surrendered himself to Peter I in Seville. However, the Castilian king—still outraged at his previous alliance with Aragon—personally killed him with a lance on 27 April and sent his severed head to Granada.

== Geopolitical background ==
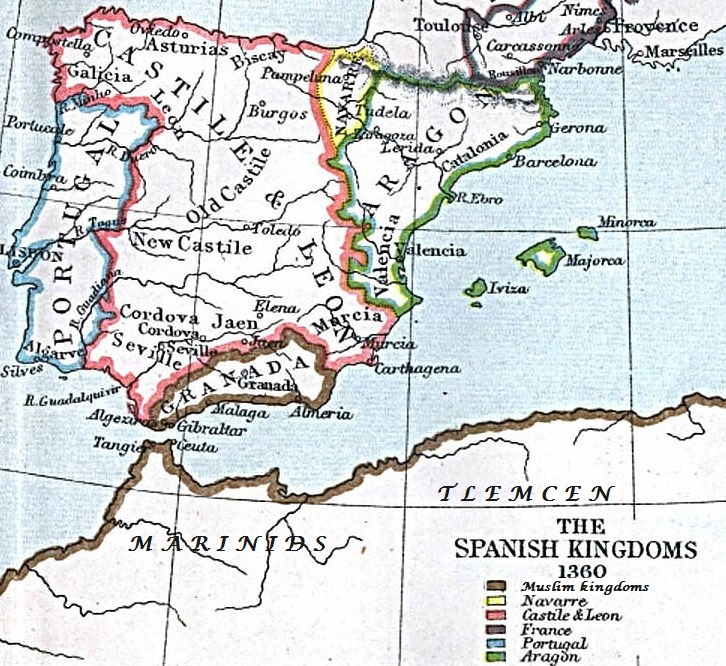
Granada and the surrounding kingdoms in 1360

The Emirate of Granada was the last remaining Muslim state on the Iberian Peninsula, founded by Muhammad I in the 1230s. Through a combination of diplomatic and military manoeuvres, the emirate succeeded in maintaining its independence, despite being located between two larger neighbours: the Christian Crown of Castile to the north and the Muslim Marinid Sultanate in Morocco. Granada intermittently entered into alliance or went to war with both of these powers, or encouraged them to fight one another, in order to avoid being dominated by either. From time to time, the sultans of Granada swore fealty and paid tribute to the kings of Castile, an important source of income for Castile. From Castile's point of view, Granada was a royal vassal, while Muslim sources never described the relationship as such.

== Origin ==
Family tree of Muhammad VI and his predecessors

Abu Said Faraj	Fatima
Ismail I	Muhammad
Buthayna	Yusuf I	Maryam	Ismail
Muhammad V	Ismail II	daughter	Muhammad VI

Note: Partial family tree. Previous sultans are indicated with yellow.

Muhammad ibn Ismail was born on 18 March 1333, likely in Granada, and a member of the ruling Nasrid dynasty. He was the grandson of Abu Abdullah Muhammad ibn Faraj, the brother of Sultan Ismail I (r. 1314–1325), and therefore he was related to the Ismail I's sons and grandsons who took the throne before his reign. In 1327, Muhammad ibn Faraj claimed the throne in Andarax, but he was defeated by Muhammad IV (r. 1325–1333) in the ensuing civil war. Muhammad VI was a second cousin to his immediate predecessors, Muhammad V (r. 1354-1359 and 1362-1391) and Ismail II (1359–1360). He was further linked to the royal lineage by his marriage to a daughter of Yusuf I (r. 1333–1354) during Yusuf's reign. The name of the princess he married was unknown, but she was a full-blooded sister of Ismail II and a half-sister of Muhammad V, who was born of a different mother. The marriage took place some time before Yusuf's death in 1354, and they had at least one daughter, whose name is unknown. She married Muhammad ibn al-Mawl, a member of a prominent family originally from Cordoba, and this marriage produced Muhammad's grandchildren: the future sultan Yusuf IV ibn al-Mawl (r. 1432) and a daughter called Maryam.

Muhammad was nicknamed el Bermejo ("The Red One")—apparently referring to his reddish hair and beard, originally by the Christians, but the name is also attested in Muslim sources. Before his accession, he was titled al-rais (Spanish: arráez), as per Nasrid customs for a member of the royal family.

== Rise to power ==
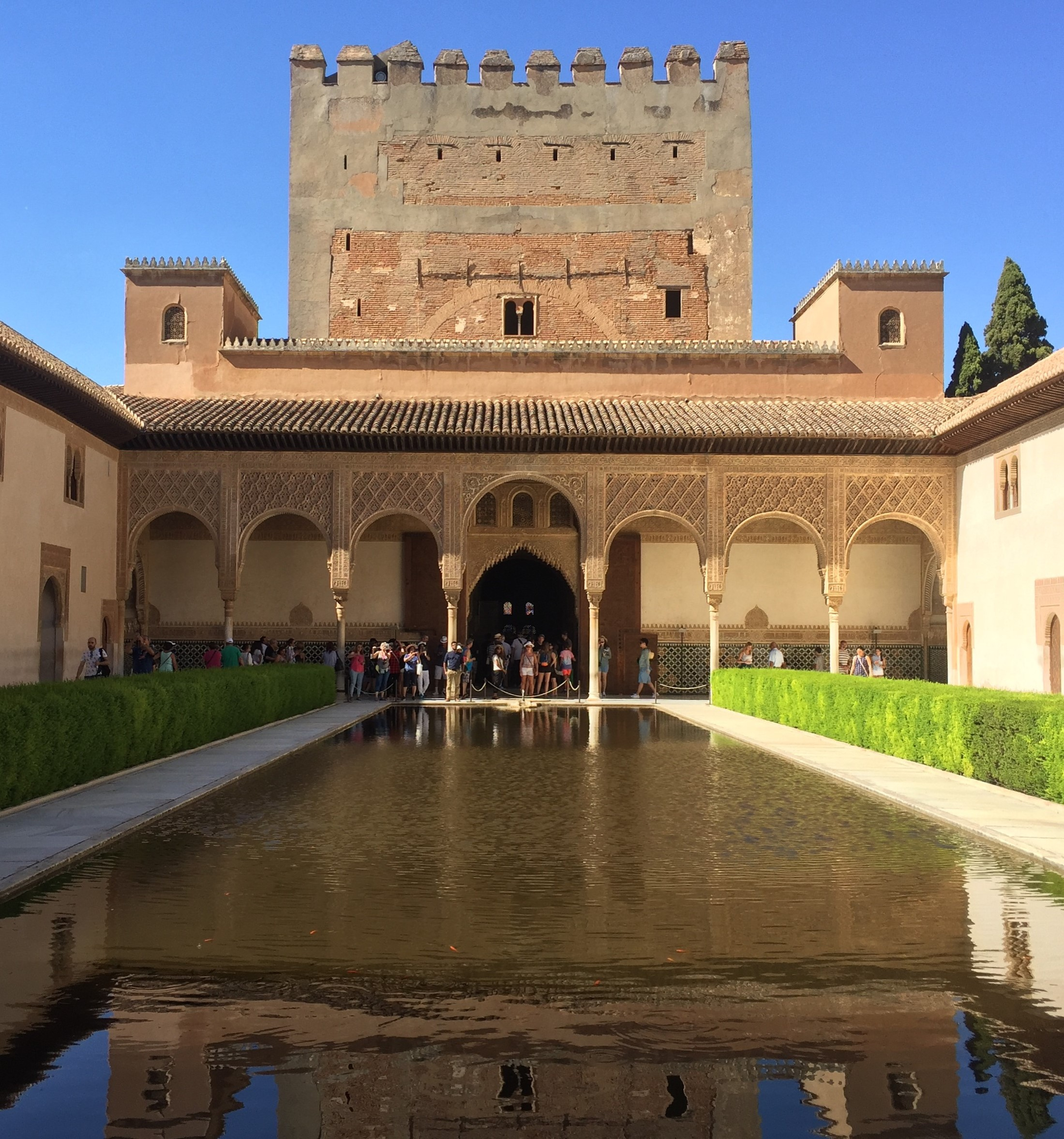
In 1360, Muhammad VI led a coup that enthroned Ismail I and deposed Muhammad V in the Alhambra complex (one of its palaces pictured).

The Emirate of Granada, with relevant towns and cities

During the first reign of Muhammad V, el Bermejo was involved in a conspiracy that eventually deposed the Sultan in favour of Ismail II. The other key participant of this conspiracy was Maryam, Ismail's ambitious mother, who had control of a substantial amount of wealth after the death of Yusuf I. She frequently visited her daughter who was married to el Bermejo, and during these meetings they planned the conspiracy. With Maryam's financial backing, el Bermejo led about 100 men to carry out a coup on 23 August 1359, a date predicted as auspicious by an astrologer. Under cover of the night during the holy month of Ramadan, they scaled the walls of the Alhambra—the fortified palace compound of the Nasrids—taking advantage of a gap that was left unrepaired, and overwhelmed the guards. They killed Muhammad V's chief minister, the hajib Abu Nu'aym Ridwan, in front of his family, demolished his house, and took his rich possessions. Muhammad V happened to be outside the Alhambra, and fled to the eastern city of Guadix after failing to retake the palace compound. The conspirators found Ismail, who was barely twenty years old, in his assigned palace and declared him the Sultan.

The historian Ibn al-Khatib—a minister of Muhammad V—depicted the new Sultan as a weak ruler with poor personal character. Soon, el Bermejo grew in influence and became the real power behind the throne. Muhammad V left for exile in North Africa after unsuccessfully trying to extend his control beyond Guadix and to secure help from his ally Peter I of Castile.

El Bermejo's power grew so much that Ismail began to oppose him. Before the Sultan could act, el Bermejo started a violent coup which resulted in his accession, either on 24 June 1360 (8 Shaban 761) or on the night of 13 July (27 Shaban), less than a year after Ismail's accession. El Bermejo's men surrounded the sultan, who barricaded himself in a tower overlooking the capital. Ismail was forced to surrender and offered to live in seclusion, but el Bermejo took him, barefooted and bareheaded, to a dungeon for criminals (tabaq), where he was executed. His head was cut off and thrown to the people. Next, el Bermejo found Ismail's brother Qays, who was still a child, and executed him as well. Both their bodies were dumped in public covered only with rags, before recovered and buried the next day. Ismail's ministers were then executed as well. According to historian Francisco Vidal Castro, el Bermejo's actions were motivated by fear that either royal would be used in a future court intrigue against him, as Ismail had been to dethrone Muhammad V. Thus el Bermejo took the throne as Muhammad VI.

== Rule ==
At his accession he adopted two laqabs (regnal honorifics), al-Ghalib bi 'llah ("Victor by the Grace of God") and al-Mutawakkil ala 'llah ("He who relies on God"), an unusual practice given his lack of major achievements. Muslim chroniclers described Muhammad VI as a coarse man in dress and manners as well as lacking in oratory skills. He reportedly hunted with his dogs, appeared in public bareheaded and with rolled up sleeves, and he had a tic that moved his head right and left uncontrollably. According to Ibn al-Khatib, he had a hashish addiction. On being informed by his sahib al-shurta (chief of police) that his people had abandoned all their vices, Muhammad enquired, "And the hashish, what about that?" and was told none had been found. He answered, "I would that were so! But go to the house of So-and-so and So-and-so ..." and then provided the names and addresses of all those whose gatherings he had previously attended. The police subsequently found hashish in those places, and the police chief told Ibn al-Khatib that the Sultan became "my instructor in my own profession".

Muhammad VI ruled tyrannically and persecuted those whom he suspected of sympathising with Muhammad V, which, combined with his poor manners, caused many at court to flee Granada to Morocco or to the Christian Crown of Castile. He made a deal with the Marinid Sultan of Morocco, Abu Salim Ibrahim, in which Abu Salim was to keep the dethroned Muhammad V from returning to the Iberian Peninsula, while Muhammad VI arrested rebellious Moroccan princes who took asylum in Granada. Muhammad VI abandoned his predecessors' policy of alliance with Castile; instead he stopped the customary tribute to Castile and on 9 October 1360 concluded an alliance with its enemy in the War of the Two Peters, the Christian Crown of Aragon. The six-year treaty was ratified in 16 February 1361 and included terms providing the freedom of emigrations for Aragon's Muslim subjects (mudéjares), similar to those secured by Ismail I in 1321, but soon this provision was rendered ineffective due to various unofficial obstacles implemented by Peter IV. The friendly correspondence between Muhammad VI and Peter IV of Aragon are conserved today as part of the Aragonese archives.

Castile defeated Aragon in Nájera in 1360, but the prospect of fighting on two fronts worried Peter I, who then agreed to peace with Peter IV in May 1361. Peter IV wrote to Muhammad VI that he made peace under the direction of Pope Innocent VI, and did not wish to lose the friendship of the Sultan. The Castilian king then shifted his attention against Muhammad VI. He pressured Abu Salim to allow Muhammad V to return to Granada by threatening to attack Marinid possessions on the Iberian Peninsula. The Marinid Sultan complied; Muhammad V sailed to Gibraltar in August 1361. A rival court was established at the Marinid outpost of Ronda, with the financial backing of Peter I. When the Marinid and Castilian navy launched joint attacks on Granada's coast, Muhammad VI requested Aragon to send ships against the Marinids while he dealt with the Castilians.

Muhammad V and Peter I then launched an offensive with the intention of deposing Muhammad VI. In 1361, their troops defeated those of Muhammad VI in Belillos. They advanced towards the Vega of Granada, and appeared to have won several skirmishes in Pinos Puente, but despite the presence of Muhammad V, the Granadan royal army did not defect as they had hoped. In 15 January 1362, Muhammad VI won a major victory against a Castilian incursion near Guadix, in which he took 2,000 prisoners, including various noblemen. In a gesture of goodwill, he returned the most important of them, Diego García de Padilla, the Master of the Order of Calatrava and the brother of the royal mistress María, along with other captured knights and gifts to Castile, but this failed to appease Peter. Peter and Muhammad V joined their forces for an offensive in February 1362, taking Iznájar and Coria, but Muhammad V was antagonized by Peter's ambition to keep the conquered territories for Castile; from March onwards they led their campaigns independently. Peter took numerous fortresses, including Cesna, Sagra (later retaken by Granada's forces), Benamejí, El Burgo, Ardales, Cañete, Turón, and Cuevas del Becerro. Meanwhile, Muhammad V took Málaga, the second most important city of the emirate after Granada, along with many nearby castles, giving him control of the entire western region of the emirate. These campaigns turned the tide of the war against Muhammad VI.

== Downfall ==
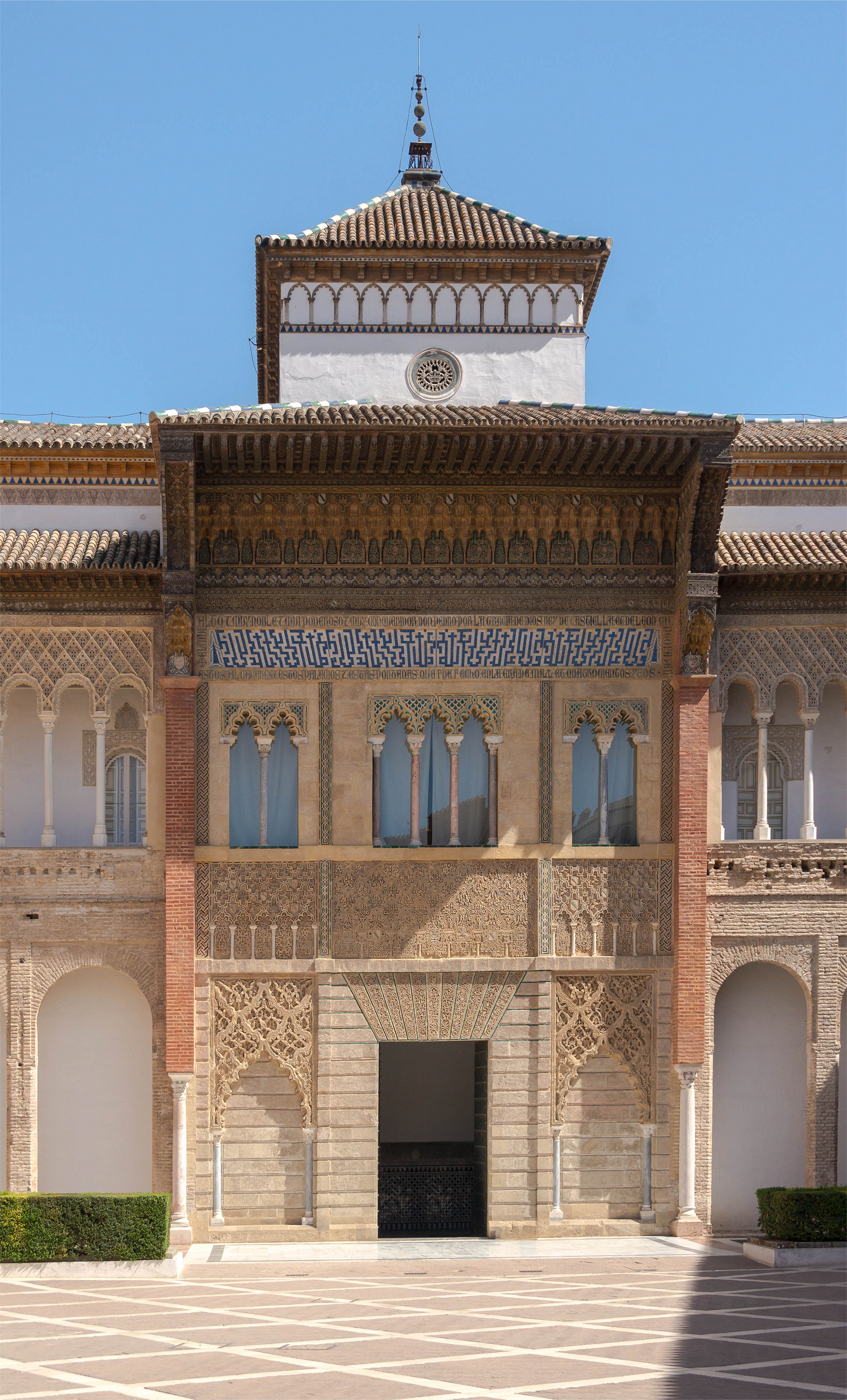
Before his death, Muhammad VI sought asylum with Peter I of Castile in Seville. Pictured: Peter's palace in Seville.

The advance of Muhammad V, along with the discontent in the general population about the civil war that included the loss of Granadan territories to Castile, caused Muhammad VI to consider his position to be no longer tenable. He fled Granada on 13 April 1362 (17 Jumada II 763), (Note: Both Vidal Castro: Muhammad VI and Fernández-Puertas 1997, p. 18 give this date as 17 Jumada II 763 AH; Vidal Castro converts it as 13 April 1362 but Fernández-Puertas mistakenly gives 13 March.) accompanied by his entourage, including the chief of the Volunteers of the Faith, Idris ibn Uthman ibn al-Ula, taking most of the royal treasury. Muhammad V entered the Alhambra three days later and was recognised as Sultan. Muhammad VI unexpectedly threw himself at the mercy of Peter I at Seville. Muhammad VI offered to rule Granada as a vassal of Peter and to serve him as his knight. Should Peter choose to remain in Muhammad V's side, Muhammad VI asked to be exiled overseas. Initially, Peter did not commit to an answer, but he welcomed Muhammad VI and allowed him and his followers to stay in the city's Jewish quarter near Peter's palace, as royal guests. Later, however, the Castilian king acted against his guests: he arrested them after a feast that he organized, imprisoned the entire retinue in Seville's shipyard, and seized their riches.

Two days later Muhammad VI was slain at Tablada, a castle near Seville on 25 or 27 April. Dressed in scarlet, he was led on a donkey to a field, and then tied to a stake. Peter I personally struck him with a lance, saying, "Take that for causing me to get a bad deal from the king of Aragon!" to which Muhammad VI replied, in Arabic, "What a little deed of chivalry". Peter I had blamed Muhammad VI's alliance with Aragon in the previous war against Castile for forcing him into an unfavourable peace agreement with Peter IV, in which he had to return various castles he had taken. The Castilian chronicler Pero López de Ayala wrote that Muhammad VI's treasury was the main reason for the murder, while Ibn al-Khatib wrote that Peter also desired to demonstrate his support for Muhammad V. The execution caused an outrage at the Castilian court, where many considered it an atrocious act of betrayal, and Peter justified it as a punishment for Muhammad VI's treason against Muhammad V, for killing Ismail II, and for entering Seville without obtaining a proper safe conduct—without this official guarantee, Peter argued that there was no betrayal. Arabic sources, especially the pro-Muhammad V official chronicles, support Peter's arguments.

Along with Muhammad, 36 members of his entourage were killed, while the rest—totalling about 300—were imprisoned and later poisoned, including Idris. Peter sent the blood stained heads of Muhammad VI and his men to Muhammad V in Granada. For a time before they were buried, the Sultan hanged them near the section of the wall Muhammad VI had scaled to enter the Alhambra in the 1359 coup.

== Sources ==
- Arié, Rachel (1973). L'Espagne musulmane au temps des Nasrides (1232–1492) (in French). Paris: E. de Boccard. OCLC 3207329.
- Boloix Gallardo, Bárbara (2013). Las Sultanas de la Alhambra: las grandes desconocidas del reino nazarí de Granada (siglos XIII-XV) (in Spanish). Granada: Patronato de la Alhambra y del Generalife. ISBN 978-8-49045-0-451.
- Fernández-Puertas, Antonio (1997). "The Three Great Sultans of al-Dawla al-Ismā'īliyya al-Naṣriyya Who Built the Fourteenth-Century Alhambra: Ismā'īl I, Yūsuf I, Muḥammad V (713–793/1314–1391)". Journal of the Royal Asiatic Society. Third Series. 7 (1). London: Cambridge University Press on behalf of Royal Asiatic Society of Great Britain and Ireland: 1–25. doi:10.1017/S1356186300008294. JSTOR 25183293. S2CID 154717811. (registration required)
- Harvey, L. P. (1992). Islamic Spain, 1250 to 1500. Chicago: University of Chicago Press. ISBN 978-0-226-31962-9.
- Latham, John D. & Fernández-Puertas, Antonio (1993). "Naṣrids". In Bosworth, C. E.; van Donzel, E.; Heinrichs, W. P. & Pellat, Ch. (eds.). The Encyclopaedia of Islam, Second Edition. Volume VII: Mif–Naz. Leiden: E. J. Brill. pp. 1020–1029. ISBN 978-90-04-09419-2.
- O'Callaghan, Joseph F. (2014). The Last Crusade in the West: Castile and the Conquest of Granada. Philadelphia: University of Pennsylvania Press. ISBN 978-0-8122-0935-8.
- O'Callaghan, Joseph F. (2013). A History of Medieval Spain. Ithaca, New York: Cornell University Press. ISBN 978-0-8014-6872-8.
- Vidal Castro, Francisco. "Ismail II". Diccionario Biográfico electrónico (in Spanish). Real Academia de la Historia.
- Vidal Castro, Francisco. "Muhammad VI". Diccionario Biográfico electrónico (in Spanish). Real Academia de la Historia.
- Vidal Castro, Francisco (2004). "El asesinato político en al-Andalus: la muerte violenta del emir en la dinastía nazarí". In María Isabel Fierro (ed.). De muerte violenta: política, religión y violencia en Al-Andalus (in Spanish). Madrid: Consejo Superior de Investigaciones Científicas. pp. 349–398. ISBN 978-84-00-08268-0.

Muhammad VI of Granada Nasrid dynasty Cadet branch of the Banu Khazraj Born: 1332 Died: 1362
Regnal titles
Preceded by Ismail II	Sultan of Granada; 1360–1362	Succeeded by Muhammad V
