= Ismail I of Granada =

Sultan of Granada from 1314 to 1325

Ismail I

Sultan of Granada
- Reign: February 1314 – 8 July 1325
- Predecessor: Nasr of Granada
- Successor: Muhammad IV
- Born: 3 March 1279
- Died: 8 July 1325 (aged 46); The Alhambra, Granada
- Issue: Muhammad IV, Yusuf I, others
Names
- أبو الوليد إسماعيل بن فرج ʾAbū al-Walīd Ismāʿīl ibn Faraj
- Dynasty: Nasrid
- Father: Abu Sa'id Faraj
- Mother: Fatima bint al-Ahmar
- Religion: Islam

Abu'l-Walid Ismail I ibn Faraj (Note: Arabic: أبو الوليد إسماعيل الأول بن فرج) (3 March 1279 – 8 July 1325) was the fifth Nasrid ruler of the Emirate of Granada on the Iberian Peninsula from 1314 to 1325. A grandson of Muhammad II on the side of his mother Fatima, he was the first of the lineage of sultans now known as the al-dawla al-isma'iliyya al-nasriyya (lit. 'the Nasrid dynasty of Ismail'). Historians characterise him as an effective ruler who improved the emirate's position with military victories during his reign.

He claimed the throne during the reign of his maternal uncle, Sultan Nasr, after a rebellion started by his father Abu Said Faraj. Their forces defeated the unpopular Nasr and Ismail was proclaimed sultan in the Alhambra in February 1314. He spent the early years of his reign fighting Nasr, who attempted to regain the throne from his base in Guadix, where he was initially allowed to rule as governor. Nasr enlisted the help of Castile, which then secured a papal authorisation for a crusade against Ismail. The war continued with intermittent truces and reached its climax in the Battle of the Vega on 25 June 1319, which resulted in a complete victory for Ismail's forces, led by Uthman ibn Abi al-Ula, over Castile. The deaths in the battle of Infante Peter and Infante John, the two regents for the infant King Alfonso XI, left Castile leaderless and forced it to end support for Nasr.

After an initial truce, Ismail followed up his victory with the capture of castles on the Castilian border in 1324 and 1325, including Baza, Orce, Huéscar, Galera, and Martos. This campaign included the first use of cannons in a siege on the Iberian Peninsula, and atrocities during the assault of Martos which became infamous in Muslim chronicles. He was murdered by his relative, Muhammad ibn Ismail, on 8 July 1325, for personal reasons. During his life Ismail added buildings to the Alhambra palace complex, its Generalife palace, and the Alcázar Genil palace.

== Background ==
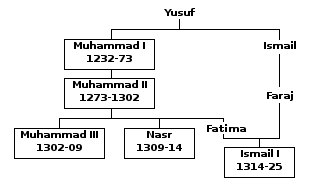
Selected members of the Nasrid dynasty up to Ismail I. Sultans are depicted in boxes.

The Emirate of Granada, with relevant towns and cities

Abu'l-Walid Ismail ibn Faraj was the son of Fatima bint al-Ahmar and Abu Said Faraj ibn Ismail. Ismail's mother Fatima was the daughter of Sultan Muhammad II (r. 1273–1302) and the sister of the sultans Muhammad III (r. 1302–1309) and Nasr (r. 1309–1314), the two immediate successors to and sons of Muhammad II. Ismail's father, Abu Said Faraj was also a member of the royal family, the son of Ismail ibn Nasr, who was a brother of the dynasty founder Muhammad I (r. 1238–1273). Therefore, Ismail was related to the ruling Nasrid dynasty in two ways: through his mother he was the grandson of Muhammad II and great-grandson of Muhammad I, while through his father he was a great-nephew of Muhammad I. Abu Said married Fatima during the reign of her father, Muhammad II, for whom he was a trusted advisor as well as a cousin. Abu Said was also appointed governor of Málaga by Muhammad II. Málaga was the second largest city of the Emirate of Granada after the capital, Granada, and its most important Mediterranean port, without which "Granada was no more than an isolated mountain-girt city," according to the historian L. P. Harvey. Abu Said's father, Ismail ibn Nasr, had also served as its governor until he died in 1257.

The emirate was the last Muslim state on the Iberian Peninsula, founded by Muhammad I in the 1230s. Through a combination of diplomatic and military manoeuvres, the emirate succeeded in maintaining its independence, despite being located between two larger neighbours: the Christian Crown of Castile to the north and the Muslim Marinid Sultanate in Morocco. Granada intermittently entered into alliance or went to war with both these powers, or encouraged them to fight one another, in order to avoid being dominated by either. From time to time, the sultans of Granada swore fealty and paid tributes to the kings of Castile, an important source of income for Castile. From Castile's point of view, Granada was a royal vassal, while Muslim sources never described the relationship as such, and Muhammad I, for instance, on occasions declared his fealty to other Muslim sovereigns.

== Early life ==
Ismail was born on 3 March 1279 (17 Shawwal 677 AH), shortly after his father Abu Said was sent to Málaga as governor on 11 February. He was likely born in the Alhambra, the royal palace complex in Granada, because his mother was in late pregnancy at the time of Abu Said's departure, and the Nasrid rule in Málaga was still unstable because it had just been recaptured after a long rebellion by the Banu Ashqilula. Ismail and his mother subsequently moved to Málaga, where his father served as an effective governor and a trusted advisor for Muhammad II and later Muhammad III. Ismail had a younger brother, named Muhammad, whose birth date was unknown. During his youth Ismail was said to be well-loved by his father and by his maternal grandfather, Muhammad II. Biographers described him as a person who loved hunting and who had long, dark-red beard.

Ismail's maternal uncle Sultan Nasr became unpopular at court in the last years of his reign. The near-contemporary historian Ibn Khaldun wrote that this was due to his and his vizier's "tendencies towards violence and injustice", while Harvey rejects this explanation as propaganda and writes that "exactly why Naṣr fell is not clear." The historian Antonio Fernández-Puertas links Nasr's unpopularity to his activities in science, especially astronomy, which were deemed excessive by his nobles. Furthermore, Nasr was suspected of being too pro-Christian, because of his education by his Christian mother and his good relationship with Ferdinand IV. His vizier, Ibn al-Hajj, was also unpopular as he was believed to have too much power over the Sultan. Compounding their image problem, they both often dressed in the Castilian manner. Harvey also opines that Nasr was blamed "perhaps unfairly" for Granada's losses in the war that occurred during his reign against the Marinid Sultanate and the Christian kingdoms of Castile and Aragon. Initially, he faced an attempted coup to restore his predecessor, the dethroned Muhammad III, in November 1310. That attempt failed, but Abu Said Faraj, encouraged by an anti-Nasr faction he met at court, started another rebellion the following year in the name of his son Ismail, who had a stronger claim to the throne thanks to the lineage of his mother. According to Fernández-Puertas, Abu Said's decision was partly prompted by the drowning of Muhammad III at the order of Nasr after the failed coup, but there are conflicting reports of when this assassination happened; other historians such as Francisco Vidal Castro considered the most likely date to be in February 1314, long after the start of Abu Said's rebellion.

The pro-Ismail rebels, led by Abu Said, took Antequera, Marbella, and Vélez-Málaga; advanced to the Vega of Granada; and defeated Nasr's forces at a place called al-Atsha by Arabic sources, possibly today's Láchar. Abu Said proceeded to besiege the capital but lacked the necessary supplies for a protracted campaign. Castile's forces under the brother of King Ferdinand IV (r. 1285–1312), Infante Peter, defeated Abu Said and Ismail on 28 May 1312. Abu Said sought peace, which was signed on 5 August, under which Abu Said was able to retain his post as governor of Málaga and resumed paying tributes to the sultan.

== Rise to power ==
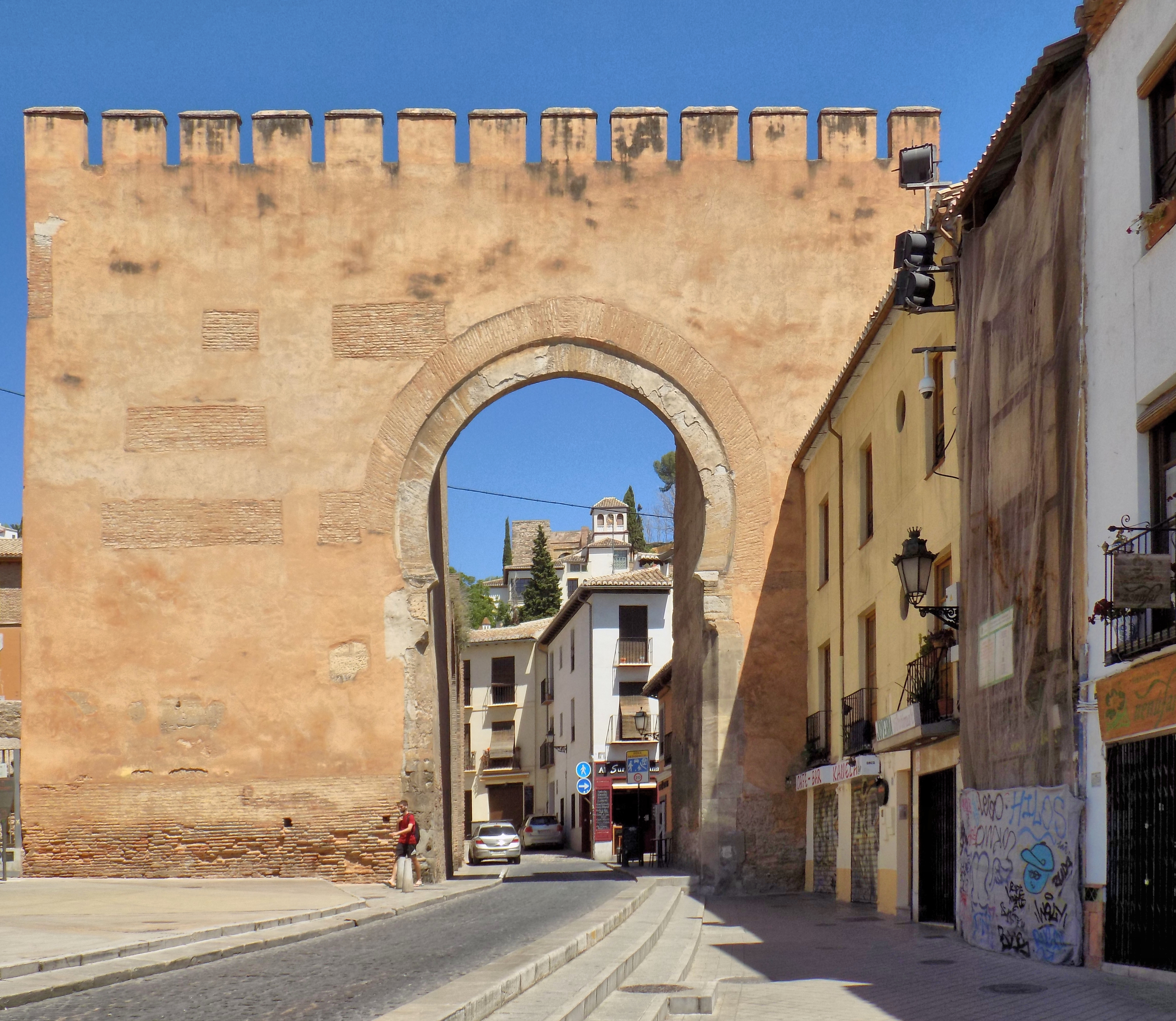
The Gate of Elvira, where Ismail I entered Granada in 1314

Fearing the sultan's vengeance, Abu Said sent his katib (secretary) Ibn Isa to negotiate a secret deal with the Marinids, in which he was to yield Málaga in exchange for the governorship of Salé in North Africa. The negotiations became known to the people of Málaga and were considered treachery; the citizens rose up and deposed him as their leader in favour of Ismail. Ismail did not arrest his father but kept him under watch in Málaga. During a visit outside the city, Abu Said was suspected of attempting to flee and was captured by Málaga's citizens. Ismail arrived before his father was harmed, then ordered his imprisonment in the castle of Cártama. Later, during Ismail's reign, he was moved to the castle of Salobreña, where he died in 1320.

Opposition to Nasr continued, and members of the anti-Nasr faction fled the court to Ismail's stronghold of Málaga. Soon Ismail restarted the rebellion, with help from his mother Fatima and Uthman ibn Abi al-Ula, the commander of the North African Volunteers of the Faith garrisoned in the city. As Ismail moved towards Granada, his army swelled and the capital's inhabitants opened the city gates for him. Ismail entered the city from the Elvira (Ilbira) Gate and besieged Nasr, who remained in the Alhambra complex. Nasr tried to request help from Infante Peter, who was now one of the regents of Castile after the death of Ferdinand IV and the accession of the infant King Alfonso XI (r. 1312–1350), but Castilian help did not come in time. Meanwhile, Ismail took residence in the old castle (qasba qadima) of the Albayzín district. According to Vidal Castro, he declared himself sultan on 14 February 1314 (27 Shawwal 713 AH). Ismail and Nasr then agreed to a settlement by which the former sultan abdicated and surrendered the Alhambra to his nephew. Ismail entered the palace complex on 16 February, and an accession ceremony for Ismail took place in the Alhambra on 28 February (12 Dhu al-Qaida). Nasr was permitted to leave for the eastern city of Guadix on the night of 19 February, where he ruled as governor. According to the Encyclopaedia of Islam's entry of the Nasrid dynasty, Nasr's departure for Guadix took place on 8 February (21 Shawwal).

== Reign ==
=== Defending the throne ===
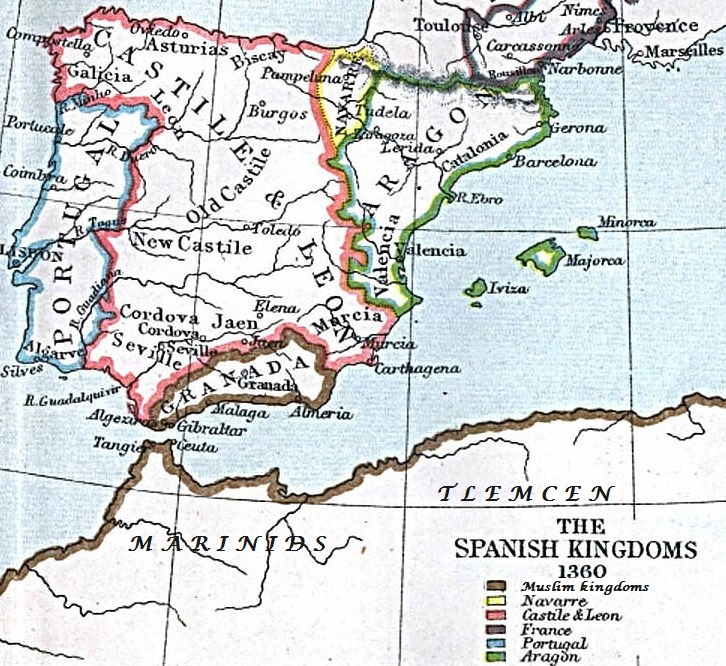
Granada and the surrounding kingdoms, 14th century

The first years of Ismail's reign were marked by conflict with the deposed Nasr, who called himself "King of Guadix" and ruled the city independently. He accused Ismail of violating his guarantee of Nasr's security and enlisted the help of his relatives and servants to attempt to regain the throne. He was also supported by the exiled North African princes Abd al-Haqq ibn Uthman and Hammu ibn Abd al-Haqq, who followed him to Guadix. Ismail put his border regions on alert to anticipate Castilian interventions in favour of Nasr, whom the Castilian king considered to be his vassal. He also appointed Uthman ibn al-Ula as the commander of the western section of the jund (regular army), in charge of facing the Castilian threat, in addition to his post as the commander of the Volunteers of the Faith.

Ismail laid siege to Guadix in May 1315 but left unsuccessfully after 45 days. Nasr requested help from Castile and Aragon: King James II of Aragon did not pledge any specific assistance, but Peter summoned the nobles of Castile in the spring of 1316, securing support for a military campaign in Granada. Castile sent a supply column to Nasr, again besieged in Guadix, but it was intercepted by Granadan forces led by Uthman ibn Abi al-Ula, resulting in a major battle on 8 May at Guadahortuna/Wadi Fortuna near Alicún. Contemporary Muslim and Christian sources disagreed on the victor of this battle, but modern historians have concluded that Castile won the battle: Harvey and Fernández-Puertas infer that the Castilians achieved a narrow victory based on the fact that they advanced closer to Granada after the battle, while Joseph F. O'Callaghan wrote that it was a "complete victory" which resulted in the death of 1,500 Muslims. Ismail was forced to lift the siege and withdraw to Granada, and in the following month Peter captured various castles, including Cambil, Alhamar, and Benaxixar, and burned the outskirts of Iznalloz. Meanwhile, Ismail allied himself with Yahya ibn Abi Talib, the Azafid governor of Ceuta, who defeated Castile in a naval battle and then laid siege to Gibraltar. The siege was abandoned when Castile sent a relief force. Later in the summer of 1316, Peter and Ismail agreed to a truce until 31 March 1317.

Peter invaded Granada again in 1317, pillaging the countryside in the plain of Granada in July, and then captured Bélmez. Ismail then agreed to pay tribute to Castile in exchange for another truce. War resumed in the spring of 1318, and by September Ismail and Peter agreed to another truce. Ismail expected another attack to be imminent: Castile and Aragon had secured a crusading bull in 1317 from Pope John XXII, who also authorised the use of funds levied by the church to support the war. Ismail sought help from the Marinid Sultan Abu Sa'id Uthman II (r. 1310–1331), who required that Ismail hand over Uthman ibn Abi al-Ula, who had previously attempted to claim the Marinid throne for himself. Ismail rejected this condition. Peter began preparations for another invasion and told Ismail he had to break the truce and stop receiving Granadan money because of the papal bull; Ismail denounced this act as a betrayal. At this point, Peter's intention was probably not the restoration of Nasr but rather the total conquest of Granada, and he declared, "I would not be a son of King Don Sancho, if, within a few years, if God gives me life, I did not cause the house of Granada to be restored to the Crown of Spain." Peter invaded Granadan territories in May 1319 and captured Tíscar on the 26th. Peter was joined by his co-regent, Infante John, and they advanced to Granada in mid-June. They arrived in the city's vicinity on 23 June, but decided to turn back on the 25th. On the same day, Ismail's troops under Uthman ibn Abi al-Ula began their counter attack, attacking the rearguard commanded by Infante John. Peter responded by leading his army of 9,000 horsemen and more foot soldiers against Uthman's 5,000 horsemen.

The ensuing Battle of the Vega of Granada resulted in a complete Muslim victory. Peter fell from his horse, either struck down by blows while trying to lead his troops or entangled when charging a Granadan horseman on his own, and immediately died. John suddenly became incapacitated, "neither dead or alive", when he was trying to rally his troops after hearing the news about Peter; he would die later at night. Demoralized at Peter's death and John's incapacitation, the remaining Castilian commanders began a disorderly retreat. The Granadan forces, thinking the Castilians were preparing for battle, attacked their camp, killing and capturing many Castilians and looting their camp. Authors from both sides considered this outcome a judgement from God, with Ibn Khaldun declaring it "one of the most marvelous of God's interventions in favor of the true faith".

=== Consolidation ===
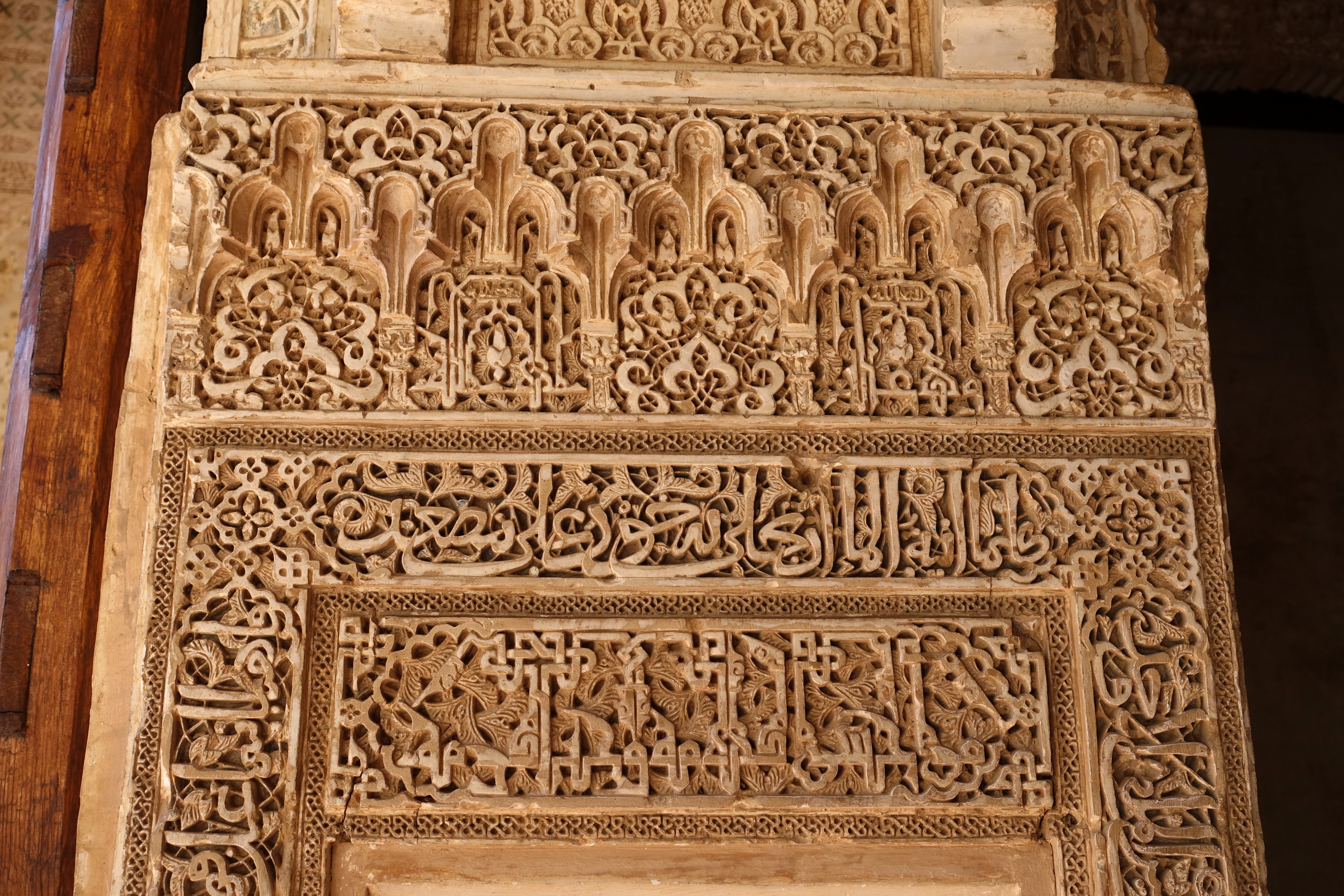
A poem in honour of Ismail carved in the Palace of the Generalife

The death of the two Castilian regents at the Battle of the Vega and the thorough defeat of their forces effectively ended the Castilian threat to Ismail's throne. With Castile's court in disarray, the Hermandad General de Andalucía – a regional confederation of frontier towns – acted to negotiate with Granada. An eight-year truce was agreed between the hermandad and Ismail at Baena on 18 June 1320, and effectively ended Castile's support for Nasr. Each town of the hermandad sent representatives to sign the treaty and pledged to accept a new regent only if he or she accepted the treaty. James II of Aragon, who also received papal authorisation and funds for a crusade against Granada, initially rebuked the hermandad for making a treaty which he stated was a "disservice to God" and not authorised by the crown, but finally made a treaty with Ismail in May 1321, to last for five years. Ismail also negotiated peace with Don Juan Manuel, acting as the leader of Murcia, part of the Castilian realms which separated Granada and Aragon. The terms include a provision that Granada could use Murcian territory in case of war against Aragon, in which case Murcia must not warn Aragon of its troops' movement. However, peace between Granada and Aragon held and their truce was renewed in 1326. Nasr died without heir in Guadix in 1322, and Ismail reunited the territories formally under his control with the emirate. Nasr's death meant Ismail's rule was now uncontested and paved the way for a new lineage of sultans beginning with him.

Despite the treaty at Baena, some other truces between Granada and Castile expired, and conflict restarted. A Castilian fleet under Alfonso Jofré Tenorio defeated Granada in a naval battle, and according to Christian records captured 1,200 Muslims who were shipped to Seville. Meanwhile, emboldened by the end of the threat from Nasr and the lack of leadership in the Castilian court, Ismail crossed the land border with Castile in order to strengthen his control over the frontiers and recapture border fortresses. In July 1324 he recaptured Baza, near Guadix. In either 1324 or 1325, (Note: Sources differ on the dates of the conquests: Vidal Castro: Ismail I writes all three were captured in 1324, while Latham & Fernández-Puertas (1993), p. 1023 gives 1325 as the date of these conquests. Harvey (1992), p. 184 specified that Huescar was captured in 1324, but did not give the date of the other sieges.) he took Orce, Huéscar, and Galera, and used cannons during one of the sieges (see below). Ismail ordered the rebuilding of defences in the conquered places, and worked on the moat of Huéscar with his own hands. Poems celebrating some of Ismail's military accomplishments were written in the Dar al-Mamlaka al-Saida (lit. 'Happy House of the Kingdom') in the Generalife of the Alhambra. Ismail's last campaign was the siege of Martos, from 22 June to 6 July 1325. During the assault Ismail lost control of his troops, who proceeded to sack the city and massacre its inhabitants. The atrocities were roundly condemned by Muslim chroniclers.

=== Reported use of cannons ===
Historians report the use of cannons at one of Ismail's sieges in 1324 or 1325, which would be the weapon's first-ever use on the Iberian peninsula, but there are differing details and interpretation. Both Joseph F. O'Callaghan (2011) and Francisco Vidal Castro unequivocally write that cannons were in fact used, in Galera according to O'Callaghan or in Huéscar according to Vidal Castro. Rachel Arié, also without equivocation or explanation, writes that Greek fire was used against Huéscar. L. P. Harvey considers both possibilities and noted that the Arabic word used by Ibn al-Khatib in reporting the event was naft, which can be translated as Greek fire, but in Andalusian Arabic can also refer to cannons and gunpowder. Harvey argues for the latter interpretation, because the report mentions that the device fired an iron ball (kurra hadidin) and made a "thunderous noise" as it did so, and these details were also corroborated by a different eyewitness (unnamed by Harvey). The weapon seemed to have enticed the surrender of the defenders in the siege, although it did not appear to make further impact in the short-term. During the reign of Ismail's son Yusuf I, the Granadans were recorded to have used the weapon again in the more strategically important defense of Algeciras of 1342–44, and it would later be used in the better known Battle of Crécy (1346).

== Administration ==
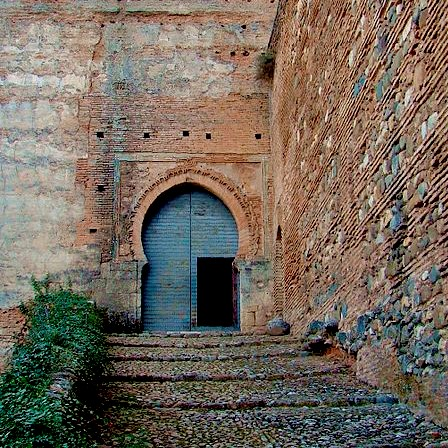
Puertas de las Armas of the Alhambra, initially built by Ismail I

Compared to other sultans, Ismail enforced a stricter and more orthodox implementation of Islamic law. Biographers emphasise his enforcement of the prohibition of alcohol, and he increased punishments for those who violated it. He prohibited the performance of female slave singers in gatherings attended by men. He ordered Jews to wear a distinctive mark, a practice rarely enforced by Islamic monarchs. He imposed the jizya tax on the Jews which resulted in a significant revenue.

Among his ministers were Abu Fath al-Fihri and Abu al-Hasan ibn Mas'ud al-Muharibi, who shared the function of the vizier (chief minister). Ismail named the renowned poet Ibn al-Jayyab as his royal secretary, and Muhammad ibn al-Mahruq as officer in charge of his finances, titled the wakil. Ibn al-Mahruq would go on to become vizier during the reign of Muhammad IV, replacing Ibn Mas'ud who died of the wounds received during the attack against Ismail. Ismail appointed Abu Nu'aym Ridwan, a Castilian-Catalan convert to Islam, as tutor of the prince Muhammad. When the young Muhammad ascended the throne, Abu Nu'aym maintained his influence over him and would be named hajib (chamberlain), a post he continued to occupy under Yusuf I and during the early period of Muhammad V's reign. In political matters, Ismail was also assisted by his mother Fatima, despite his falling out with his father. According to historian María Jesús Rubiera Mata, in this she was "as gifted with great qualities" as her husband. In the judiciary, Ismail appointed the judge Yahya ibn Mas'ud ibn Ali as qadi al-jama'a (chief judge), replacing Abu Ja'far Ahmad ibn Farkun who had served under Muhammad III and Nasr.

== Family ==
Ismail I had at least three umm walad (concubines), four sons and two daughters. A Christian named 'Alwa was his favourite, who was the mother of Muhammad (his successor Muhammad IV), Faraj, and two daughters: Fatima and Maryam. Another concubine was Bahar, who bore Yusuf (Muhammad successor's Yusuf I), and from another, Qamar, was born Ismail's youngest, named Ismail. Towards the end of his life, he separated from Alwa due to an unknown act of disobedience; she was still alive at the death of Muhammad IV in 1333.

== Death ==
Ismail was assassinated on 8 July 1325 (Monday 26 Rajab 725 AH) by a relative, Muhammad ibn Ismail, son of the Sultan's cousin (also named Ismail) known as the sahib al-Jazira (Lord of Algeciras). Historian Ibn al-Khatib – who was eleven years old and lived in Granada at the time of the murder – wrote that the Sultan had previously censured Muhammad due to an unspecified act of negligence, and that the rebuke wounded him so much he decided to murder Ismail. Christian sources reported another motive for the assassination: according to the Chronicles of Alfonso XI, Muhammad ibn Ismail captured a Christian woman at Martos, whom Ismail wanted to be given to him. When Muhammad refused, the sultan spoke in a manner Muhammad considered disrespectful. Muhammad then discussed this with Uthman ibn Abi al-Ula, who agreed to join the plot to kill Ismail. Harvey cautions that an outsider's account with such colourful details on "what went on behind closed doors" might not be reliable, especially as it differs from other sources.

The assassination took place in broad daylight in the Alhambra, in front of the public as well as Granadan high officials. The perpetrator embraced Ismail in the middle of an audience, and then stabbed him three times with a dagger he had hidden inside his arms. One of the blows hit the sultan's neck just above the collarbone. Ismail collapsed, prompting his vizier Ibn Mas'ud to come to his defense. The vizier fought the assailant and his collaborators; a sword-fight ensued followed by the flight of the conspirators. The conspirators were then found and killed on the spot – by Uthman, according to Ibn Khaldun. Their corpses were hung by the walls of the Alhambra, and their houses were sacked by the mob. Meanwhile, the Sultan was kept alive by a turban applied to his wound. He was carried to the palace of his mother Fatima, and there succumbed to his wounds. The vizier – who was seriously wounded in the attack – and Fatima rallied the court to secure the succession of Ismail's ten years old son Muhammad, now Muhammad IV. The vizier died of his wounds about one month later. Uthman was not implicated and remained an influential figure at court.

Ismail was buried in the royal cemetery (rawda) of the Alhambra, where his grandfather Muhammad II had also been buried. Centuries later with the surrender of Granada, the last Sultan Muhammad XII (also known as Boabdil) exhumed the bodies in this cemetery and reburied them in Mondújar, part of his Alpujarras estates.

== Legacy ==
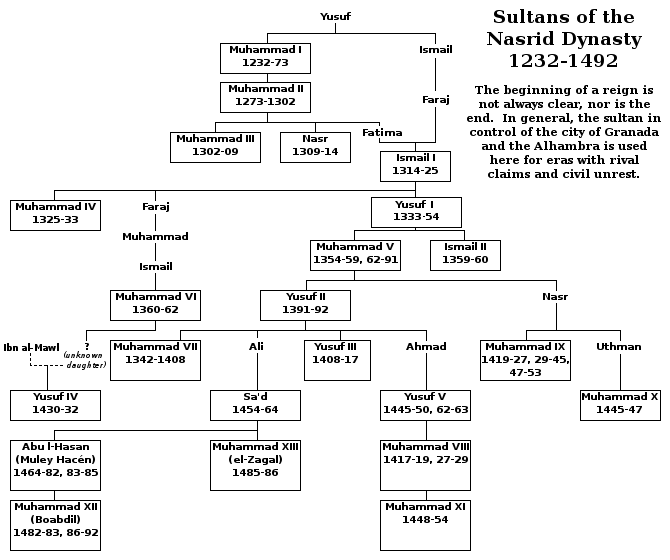
The genealogical table of the Sultans of Granada. The branch beginning with Ismail I is known as al-dawla al-isma'iliyya al-nasriyya, "the Nasrid dynasty of Ismail".

A cultured and refined man, during his life Ismail significantly added to the Alhambra complex and the palace of Generalife. He also added to the Alcázar Genil palace after his victory in 1319, and built what is now the Puertas de las Armas in Granada's alcazaba, which would later be developed into the Comares Palace, part of the Alhambra complex. His use of the cannon represented a major technical development in Iberian warfare, an advantage which Granada enjoyed alone in the Peninsula for some time: in the 1342–1344 Siege of Algeciras Granada again fielded the weapon while Castile still did not have its own. The Castilians eventually developed their own cannons, and exploited them more successfully than Granada. They were more useful in bringing down castle walls than defending them and the prevailing geopolitical balance meant that in the following period, the much larger Castile was much more often in the offensive, until its final conquest of Granada in 1492.

Ismail I was succeeded by his son Muhammad IV (r. 1315–1333), a boy of ten. Another son of Ismail succeeded Muhammad IV as Yusuf I (r. 1333–1354). The lineage of sultans beginning with Ismail is now called al-dawla al-isma'iliyya al-nasriyya, "the Nasrid dynasty of Ismail", in contrast to al-dawla al-ghalibiyya al-nasriyya, "the Nasrid dynasty of al-Ghalib", named after Muhammad I's nickname al-Ghalib billah ("The Victor by the Grace of God") and to which the first four sultans belonged. The Nasrid dynasty did not have a specific rule of succession, but Ismail I was the first of the few rulers who descended matrilineally from the royal line. The other instance happened in 1432 with the accession of Yusuf IV.

O'Callaghan called him "one of the most effective kings of Granada", while Vidal Castro characterised his reign as "very active and belligerent, which brought al-Andalus to a stronger position against its enemies". The historian Hugh N. Kennedy called him "a vigorous and effective ruler" who "might have achieved much more had he not been assassinated". Similarly, Harvey writes that he "seemed [...] destined to enjoy a long and successful reign" after his success in the Battle of the Vega, if not for his early death.

== Notes ==
=== Citations ===
Ismail I of Granada Nasrid dynasty Cadet branch of the Banu Khazraj Born: 1279 Died: 6 June 1325
Regnal titles
Preceded by Nasr	Sultan of Granada; 1314–1325	Succeeded by Muhammad IV
