= Muhammad III of Granada =

Sultan of Granada from 1302 to 1309

Muhammad III

Sultan of Granada
- Reign: 8 April 1302 – 14 March 1309
- Predecessor: Muhammad II
- Successor: Nasr
- Born: 15 August 1257; Granada, Emirate of Granada
- Died: 21 January 1314 (aged 56); Granada, Emirate of Granada
- Burial: Sabika Hill, Alhambra, Granada
Names
- Abu Abdullah Muhammad ibn Muhammad
- House: Nasrid dynasty
- Father: Muhammad II
- Religion: Islam

Muhammad III (Arabic: محمد الثالث; 15 August 1257 – 21 January 1314) was the ruler of the Emirate of Granada in Al-Andalus on the Iberian Peninsula from 8 April 1302 until 14 March 1309, and a member of the Nasrid dynasty. He ascended the Granadan throne after the death of his father Muhammad II, which according to rumours, was caused by Muhammad III poisoning him. He had the reputation of being both cultured and cruel. Later in his life, he became visually impaired—which caused him to be absent from many government activities and to rely on high officials, especially the powerful Vizier Ibn al-Hakim al-Rundi.

Muhammad III inherited an ongoing war against Castile. He built upon his father's recent military success and expanded Granada's territory further when he captured Bedmar in 1303. He negotiated a treaty with Castile the following year, in which Granada's conquests were recognised in return for Muhammad making an oath of fealty to the King of Castille, Ferdinand IV, paying him tribute. Muhammad sought to extend his rule to Ceuta, North Africa. To achieve this, he first encouraged the city to rebel against its Marinid rulers in 1304, and then, two years later, he invaded and conquered the city himself. Consequently, Granada controlled both sides of the Strait of Gibraltar. This alarmed Granada's three larger neighbours, Castile, the Marinids, and Aragon, who by the end of 1308 had formed a coalition against Granada. The three powers were preparing for an all-out war against Granada when Muhammad III was deposed in a palace coup. His foreign policy was increasingly unpopular among his nobility, and Vizier Ibn al-Hakim—who was, due to Muhammad's near-blindness, by now the power behind the throne—universally distrusted. Muhammad was replaced by his half-brother Nasr on 14 March 1309. Muhammad was allowed to live in Almuñécar, but—following an attempt by his followers to overthrow Nasr—was executed five years later in the Alhambra.

In contrast to the long reigns of his father and grandfather, Muhammad I, Muhammad III's reign was notably short; he was later known by the epithet al-Makhlu' ("the Deposed"). He was responsible for the construction of the Great Mosque of the Alhambra (later destroyed by Philip II in the sixteenth century) as well as the Partal Palace within the Alhambra. He also oversaw the construction of a nearby public bathhouse, the income from which paid for the mosque. He was known to have had a sense of humour and favoured poetry and literature. He composed his own poems, two of which survive today in Ibn al-Khatib's work Al-Lamha.

== Background ==
Map of the Nasrid Emirate of Granada in 1306 under Muhammad III's rule

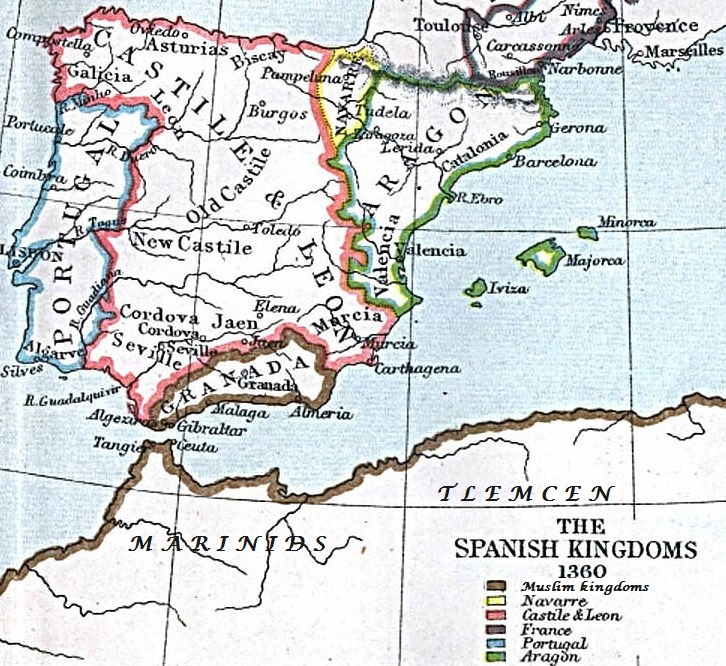
Granada (brown borders in southern Iberia) and its neighbours in 1360. Borders might differ slightly from those during Muhammad III's reign.

Al-Andalus, or the Muslim Iberian Peninsula, was ruled by multiple small kingdoms or taifas after the break-up of the Almohad caliphate in early thirteenth century. In the 1230s, Muhammad III's grandfather, Muhammad I, established one such kingdom, initially centred in his native Arjona and eventually becoming the Emirate of Granada. Before the middle of the century, the Christian kingdoms in Iberia, especially Castile, accelerated their expansion—also called reconquista—at the expense of the Muslims. As a result, Granada became the last independent Muslim state in the peninsula. Through a combination of diplomatic and military manoeuvres, the kingdom succeeded in maintaining its independence, despite being surrounded by two larger neighbours, Castile to the north and the Muslim Marinid state based in Morocco. Under the reigns of Muhammad I and his successor Muhammad II, Granada intermittently entered into an alliance, went to war with either of these powers, or encouraged them to fight one another to avoid being dominated by either. From time to time, the Sultans of Granada swore fealty and paid tributes to the Kings of Castile, which represented an important source of income for the Christian monarch. From Castile's point of view, Granada was a royal vassal, while Muslim sources never described the relationship as such, and Muhammad I, on other occasions, nominally declared his fealty to other Muslim sovereigns.

== Early life ==
Muhammad ibn Muhammad was born on 15 August 1257 (Wednesday 3 Shaban 655 AH) in Granada. His father was the future Muhammad II, and his mother was his father's first cousin (a bint 'amm marriage). They belonged to the Nasrid clan—also known as Banu Nasr or Banu al-Ahmar—which according to later Granadan historian and vizier Ibn al-Khatib, was descended from Sa'd ibn Ubadah. Sa'd was a prominent companion of the Islamic prophet Muhammad, from the Banu Khazraj tribe in Arabia; his descendants migrated to Spain and settled in Arjona as farmers. The future Muhammad III was born during the reign of his grandfather, Muhammad I, the dynasty's founder. Earlier in the same year, his father was named emirate's heir. Muhammad III had a sister, Fatima, born c. 1260 from the same mother. Their father had a second wife, a Christian named Shams al-Duha, who was mother to their much younger half-brother Nasr (born 1287). Their father, also known by the epithet al-Faqih ("the canon-lawyer") due to his erudition and education, encouraged intellectual activities in his children: Muhammad was intensively engaged in poetry, while Fatima studied the barnamaj—the biobibliographies of Islamic scholars—and Nasr studied astronomy.

When he still had good eyesight, the future Muhammad III habitually read well into the night. He was named heir (wali al-ahd) during his father's reign and was involved in the affairs of state. As crown prince, he nearly executed his father's katib (secretary) Ibn al-Hakim (also Muhammad III's future vizier), because a rumour attributed the katib to satirical verses circulating at court that criticised Granada's ruling dynasty and angered the prince. Ibn al-Hakim escaped punishment by hiding in abandoned buildings until the prince's anger subsided.

== Rule ==
=== Accession ===
Just before his death, Muhammad II oversaw a successful campaign against Castile, taking advantage of Castile's concurrent war against Aragon and the minority of the Castilian king, Ferdinand IV. He routed the Castilian army at the Battle of Iznalloz in 1295 and conquered some border towns, including Quesada in 1295 and Alcaudete in 1299. In September 1301, Muhammad secured an agreement with Aragon which planned a joint offensive and recognised Granada's rights to Tarifa, an important port on the Straits of Gibraltar taken by Castile in 1292. This agreement was ratified in January 1302, but Muhammad II died before the campaign materialised.

Muhammad III took the throne at the age of around 45, when his father died on 8 April 1302 (8 Shaban 701 AH) after 29 years of rule. There were allegations, cited by Ibn al-Khatib, that Muhammad III, perhaps impatient to assume power, killed his father by poison, although this rumour was never confirmed. (Note: Harvey 1992, p. 163, citing Ibn al-Khatib: "A story was put about that [Muhammad II] had been poisoned by a sweetmeat administered by his heir." Kennedy 2014, p. 285: "It was alleged that [Muhammad III] had in fact poisoned his father.") An anecdote says that during his accession ceremony, when a poet recited:

For whom are the banners today unfurled? For whom do the troops 'neath their standards march?

He responded with a joke: "For this fool you can see before you all."

=== Peace with Castile and Aragon ===
Initially, Muhammad III continued his father's war against Castile, the alliance with Aragon and the Marinids, and support for Alfonso de la Cerda, a pretender to the Castilian throne. He sent an embassy to the Marinid Sultan led by his Vizier Abu Sultan Aziz ibn al-Mun'im al-Dani, and lent the Sultan—then besieging the Zayyanids at Tlemcen—a contingent of Granadan archers who were familiar with siege warfare. On 11 April, he wrote to James II informing the Aragonese king of his father's death and affirming his friendship with James II and Alfonso de la Cerda. On the Castilian front, Granadan troops under Hammu ibn Abd al-Haqq ibn Rahhu took Bedmar, near Jaén, as well as neighbouring castles two weeks after Muhammad III's accession. After the conquest, he sent the wife of the town's alcaide, María Jiménez, to the Marinid Sultan. On 7 February 1303, Granada and Aragon concluded a treaty of one year. In the same year, he faced a rebellion from his relative Abu al-Hajjaj ibn Nasr, the governor of Guadix. He swiftly suppressed the rebellion and ordered Abu al-Hajjaj to be executed by another relative, chosen probably to send a message.

Muhammad III then started peace negotiations with Castile. In 1303, Castile sent a delegation led by the royal chancellor Fernando Gómez de Toledo to Granada. Castile offered to meet nearly all Granada's demands, including ceding Bedmar, Alcaudete, and Quesada. Tarifa, one of Granada's main goals, was to be kept by Castile. In exchange, Muhammad would agree to become Ferdinand's vassal and pay the parias (tribute), a typical peace arrangement between the two kingdoms. The treaty was concluded at Córdoba in August 1303 and was to last three years. In 1304, Aragon also concluded its war with Castile (by the Treaty of Torrellas) and assented to the Granada–Castile treaty, therefore creating peace between the three kingdoms, and leaving the Marinids isolated.

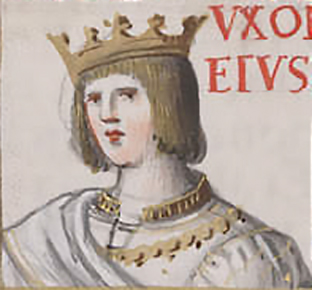
Ferdinand IV of Castile, Muhammad's contemporary, and at different times his enemy, ally, and overlord

The agreement, and the resulting alliance with Castile and Aragon, gave Granada peace and a dominant position in the Straits of Gibraltar. However, it created its own problems. Domestically, many were not happy with the alliance with the Christians, especially the Volunteers of the Faith, a military group who came from North Africa to Granada to fight a holy war. Muhammad III subsequently dismissed 6,000 of his North African troops. The Marinid state was offended by the tripartite alliance isolating it. Aragon, while part of the alliance, was worried that strong Castile-Granada relations would mean the bloc could establish a choke-hold on the Strait and devastate Aragonese trade. The Aragonese king James II sent an envoy, Bernat de Sarrià to the Marinid Sultan Abu Yaqub Yusuf, for negotiations—although ultimately these were unsuccessful.

=== The conquest of Ceuta and its repercussions ===
Taking advantage of the peace with the Christian powers, Granada attempted an expansion to Ceuta, on the North African side of the Straits of Gibraltar. The struggle for the control of the Straits, which controlled passage between the Iberian Peninsula and North Africa, was a recurring theme in Granada's foreign affairs—involving Castile and the Marinids—until the mid-fourteenth century. In 1304, the inhabitants of Ceuta declared independence from the Marinids, led by their lords from the Banu al-Azafi family. Granadan agents such as Abu Said Faraj, the governor of Málaga and Muhammad's brother-in-law, had been encouraging the rebellion. Abu Yaqub was occupied in a war against his eastern neighbour, the Zayyanid Kingdom of Tlemcen, and was therefore unable to take any strong action. In May 1306, Granada sent a fleet to capture Ceuta, sending their Azafid leaders to Granada and declaring Muhammad III the city's overlord. Their forces also landed in the Marinid ports of Ksar es-Seghir, Larache, and Asilah and occupied those Atlantic ports. Concurrently, a dissident Marinid prince, Uthman ibn Abi al-Ula, declared a rebellion, conquered a mountainous area in northern Morocco and allied himself with Granada. Abu Yaqub was murdered on 10 May 1307 and was succeeded by his grandson Abu Thabit Amir. Uthman responded by declaring himself sultan in May or June 1307, while Abu Thabit ended his grandfather's siege of Tlemcen and returned to Morocco with his troops.

Abu Thabit retook Ksar es-Seghir and Asilah from Granada and Tangiers from Uthman after defeating him in a battle. Uthman had to take refuge in Granada, where he became commander of the Volunteers of the Faith. Abu Thabit sent envoys to Muhammad III demanding the return of Ceuta and prepared a siege of the town. However, he died at Tangiers on 28 July 1308 and was succeeded by his brother Abu al-Rabi Sulayman. Abu al-Rabi agreed to a truce with Granada, leaving Ceuta under Muhammad's control. The conquest of Ceuta, together with control of Gibraltar and Algeciras, gave Granada a strong control of the Straits, but alarmed its neighbours the Marinids, Castile, and Aragon, who started considering a coalition against Granada.

=== Rise of Ibn al-Hakim ===
During Muhammad III's reign, his Vizier Abu Abdallah ibn al-Hakim al-Rundi grew in power and eventually became the most powerful man in the realm, eclipsing the Sultan himself. It is unclear exactly when or how he assumed absolute power, but it was due partly to the Sultan's blindness (or poor eyesight) (Note: Sources vary on describing the degree of his blindness or poor vision. Harvey 1992, p. 166 simply says "defective eyesight", Vidal Castro writes that he was "casi ciego" (almost blind), Rubiera Mata 1969, p. 111 says that "... se quedó ciego" (he became blind), and Fernández-Puertas 1997, p. 4 refers to him as "the ... blind Muhammad III". Historical sources, such as Harvey 1992, p. 166 and Vidal Castro mention his night-time reading habit as a possible cause of his eyesight problem. The latter also proposed a genetic factor, as his father was known to have a sight problem.) that excluded him from many of his duties. Originally from Ronda and descended from a branch of the former Abbadid dynasty, he had entered the court as a katib (secretary) in 1287 during the reign of Muhammad II and then had risen to the highest rank in the chancery. Muhammad III kept his services and appointed him as the co-vizier serving with Al-Dani, his father's vizier. The old Vizier wanted the Atiq ibn al-Mawl, a qa'id (military chief) whose family was related to the Nasrids, to succeed him as the sole vizier on his death. However, after Al-Dani's death in 1303, Muhammad III named Ibn al-Hakim as vizier anyway. Because he controlled the two powerful posts of vizier and katib, he received the title dhu al-wizaratayn ("holder of the two vizierates"). He was the one who signed the 1303 treaty with Castile at Córdoba in the name of Muhammad III, and the one who visited Ceuta after its conquest by Granada instead of the Sultan. As his power grew, the court poets began to dedicate their verses to him rather than the Sultan, and he lived a luxurious lifestyle in his palace.

=== Coalition against Granada ===
Despite efforts to allay its fears by the Granadan Vizier Al-Dani, Aragon continued diplomatic efforts against Granada. These culminated on 19 December 1308, when Aragon and Castile concluded the Treaty of Alcalá de Henares. The Christian kingdoms agreed to attack Granada, not sign a separate peace, and divide its territories between them. Aragon would gain one-sixth of the kingdom, and Castile would gain the rest. James II also made a pact with Sultan Abu al-Rabi, offering galleys and knights for the Marinid conquest of Ceuta in return for fixed payments, as well as for receiving all movable goods gained in the conquest.

The three powers—"a devastating line-up of enemies", according to historian L. P. Harvey—prepared for war against Granada and the two Christian kingdoms—without mentioning the Marinid collaboration—asked the Pope Clement V to grant a crusading bull and financial support from the church. These were granted in March and April 1309. Aragon's naval preparation was noticed by Granada, and at the end of February 1309, Muhammad III queried James II about the target of the operation. James II responded on 17 March, assuring Granada that it was for his conquest of Sardinia. Meanwhile, the Master of Calatrava already attacked Granadan territory, and the Bishop of Cartagena captured Lubrín on 13 March. The Nasrid governor of Almería responded by arresting Catalan merchants based in his city and confiscating their goods, while the Granadan fleet prepared for war.

== Ousting and later life ==
With Granada's three neighbours arrayed against it, Muhammad III became highly unpopular at home. On 14 March 1309 (on Eid ul-Fitr, 1 Shawwal 708 AH), a palace coup deposed Muhammad and executed his vizier, Ibn al-Hakim. The coup involved the vizier's political rival Atiq ibn al-Mawl, a group of Granadan notables who preferred Muhammad's 21-year-old half-brother Nasr, and the angry populace of Granada. The vizier was seen to hold the real power of the state; his policy and extravagant lifestyle caused him to be the main target of popular anger. The people of Granada sacked the palaces of the sultan and the vizier; the vizier was personally killed by Atiq ibn al-Mawl. Muhammad III was allowed to live but forced to abdicate in favour of Nasr; by his own request, his abdication was formally witnessed by several faqihs (Islamic jurists). He initially lived in the Alcázar Genil just outside the capital; according to an anecdote, a raven followed him there from the royal Alhambra. After a short period, he was moved to Almuñécar on the coast.

There was an attempt by the royal council of Granada to restore Muhammad III during Nasr's reign, taking place on November 1310 when Nasr was gravely ill. They urgently transported the old and blind Muhammad III from Almuñécar in a litter to court. However, when he arrived, Nasr had recovered, and the attempt to restore him failed. Muhammad III was then imprisoned in the Dar al-Kubra (La Casa Mayor, "Big House") of the Alhambra and was rumoured to have been killed. The rumour of his assassination was one of the factors behind the rebellion led by Abu Said Faraj and his son Ismail, which eventually resulted in Nasr himself being deposed and Ismail taking the throne as Ismail I in 1314. While Nasr was dealing with Ismail's rebellion, another rebellion occurred in December 1313 or January 1314 in Granada to restore Muhammad III. According to historian Francisco Vidal Castro, this likely caused Nasr to murder his brother—either to end the rebellion or as punishment, after it was over. Muhammad III was murdered by drowning in a pool of the Dar al-Kubra on 21 January 1314 (Monday, 3 Shawwal 713 AH). He was buried on the Sabika Hill of the Alhambra alongside his grandfather Muhammad I.

== Personality ==
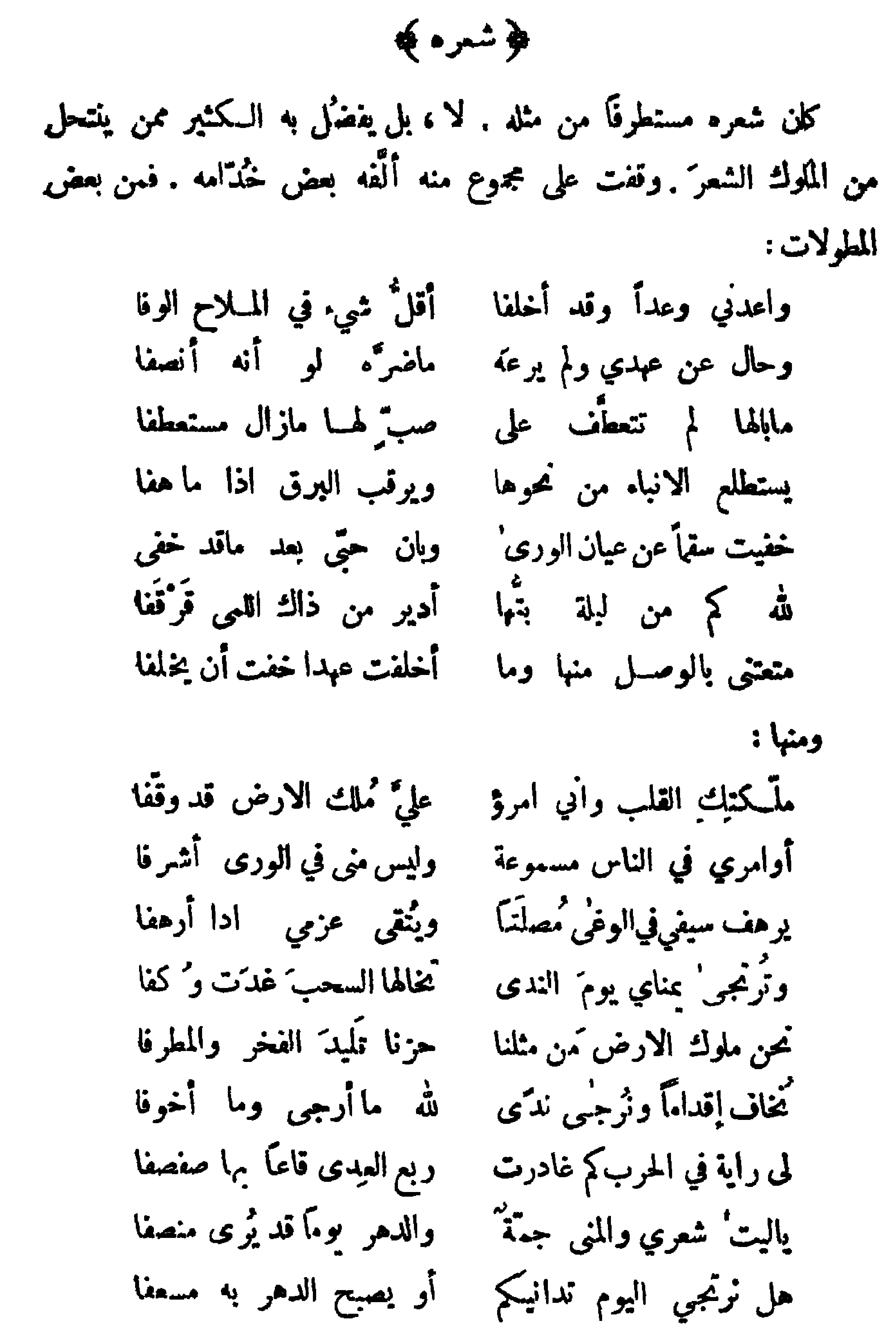
Two poems written by Muhammad III, quoted in Ibn al-Khatib's Al-Lamha (1928 or 1929 edition pictured). The poem quoted in the article corresponds to seven lines (separated into halves) on the top half of the page.

Ibn al-Khatib, who wrote histories and poetry in the mid-fourteenth century, considered Muhammad III to have been ruled by conflicting impulses. Ibn al-Khatib told a story he had heard about Muhammad III's irrational cruelty: at the start of his reign, he imprisoned his father's household troops and then refused to feed them. This continued until some of the prisoners had to eat their dead colleagues. When a guard gave them leftover food out of compassion, Muhammad executed him so that the blood flowed into the prisoners' cells. An unconfirmed allegation mentioned by Ibn al-Khatib said that he murdered his father. In addition to the cruelty, he was known to be a cultured man and like many monarchs of Al-Andalus, he particularly loved poetry. One qasida composed by him is presented in full in Ibn al-Khatib's Al-Lamha.

She made me a promise and broke it;
how little loyalty women have!
She reneged from her pledge and did not keep it;
she wouldn't have broken it if it had been fair!
How come she shows no sympathy
for an ardent lover who never stops inviting her affection,
who seeks all the news about her
and contemplates the lightning when it flashes?
I hid my ailment from the eyes of men,
but my love became clear after having been hidden.
Oh, how many nights I spent drinking
the wine of those lovely lips!
[Now] I've been denied her company,
without breaking a pledge, which I fear she has broken.

He was also known for his sense of humour, including making a self-deprecating humorous response to a poem recited during the solemn ceremony of his ascension.

== Governance and legacy ==
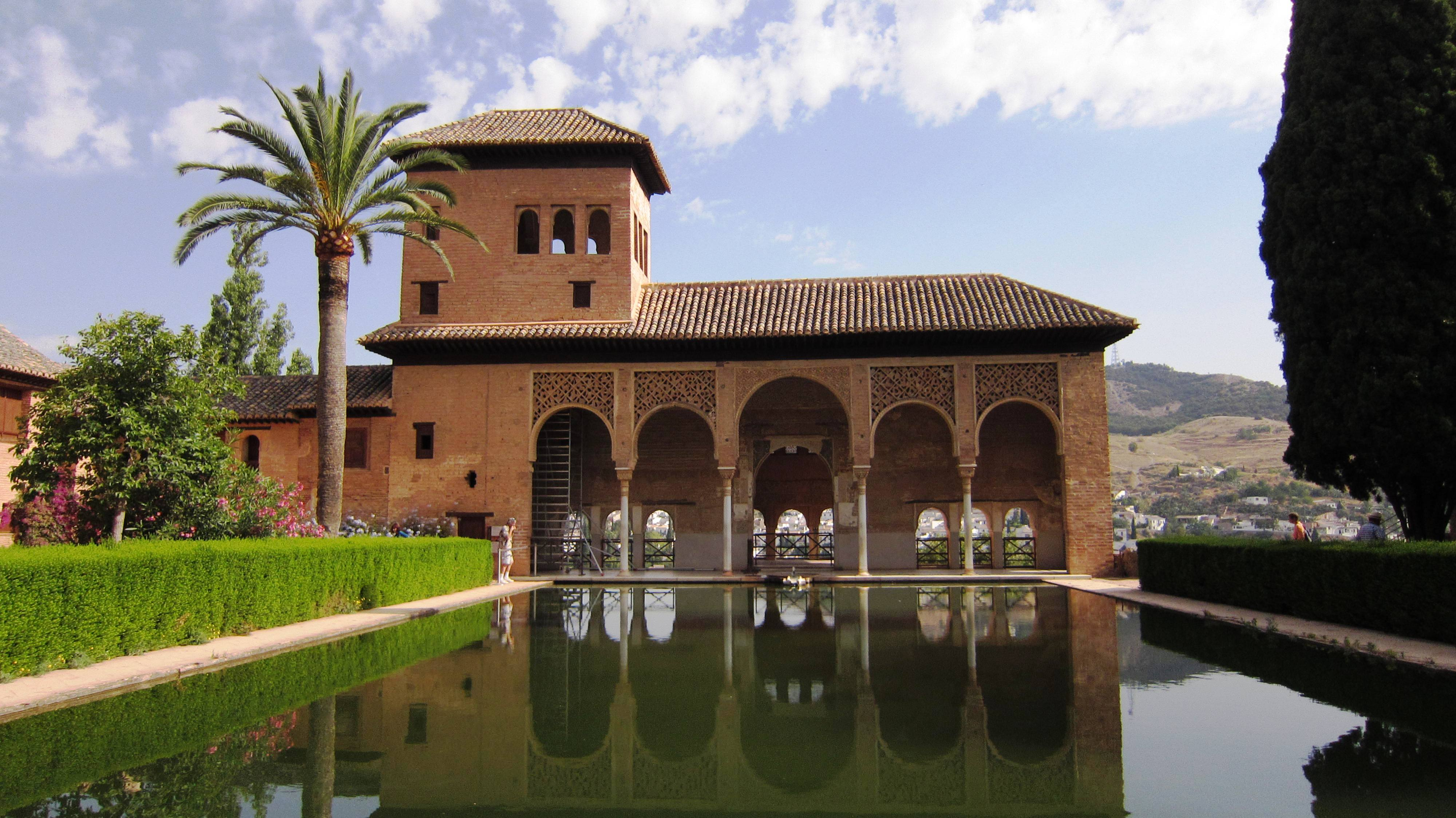
The Partal Palace of the Alhambra, whose construction is attributed to Muhammad III

Due to his blindness, he was often absent from matters of state, contributing to the absolute power later held by Vizier Ibn al-Hakim. Other than Ibn al-Hakim, his leading officials included Abu Sultan Aziz ibn al-Mun'im al-Dani (co-vizier until he died in 1303), Hammu ibn Abd al-Haqq (Chief of the Volunteers of the Faith), and Uthman ibn Abi al-Ula (Commander of the Volunteers in Málaga). His brother-in-law and cousin-uncle Abu Said Faraj served as the governor of Málaga. In the judiciary, after the death of his father's chief judge (qadi al jama'a) Muhammad ibn Hisham in 1304 or 1305, he appointed Abu Ja'far Ahmad al-Qurashi, also known as Ibn Farkun. The second highest judicial post, qadi al-manakih ("judge of marriages"), was held by the North African Muhammad ibn Rushayd, who also served as the imam and khatib of Granada's great mosque.

Muhammad III ordered the construction of the great mosque (al-masjid al-a'ẓam) of the Alhambra, the Nasrids' royal palace and fortress complex. Muslim sources described the elegance of this mosque, which does not survive today as Philip II replaced it with the Church of St. Mary of the Alhambra in 1576. He decorated it with columns and lamps, and granted the mosque a perpetual income (waqf) from the rents of the public bathhouse which he built nearby. He was also associated with other buildings in the Alhambra, including the Partal Palace.

In contrast to Muhammad I and II, who enjoyed long and stable reigns, Muhammad III was deposed after seven years. Historians gave him the epithet al-Makhlu' ("the deposed"), which was exclusively identified with him even though many of his successors were also deposed.

His successor and half-brother Nasr inherited the war against the tripartite alliance of the Marinids, Castile, and Aragon. Aragon was decisively defeated at Almeria and Castile was repulsed at Algeciras, but Nasr was less successful on the other fronts. Eventually, to obtain peace, he had to return Ceuta to the Marinids and Quesada and Bedmar to Castile—relinquishing most of Muhammad III's territorial gains. He also had to cede Algeciras to the Marinids and lost Gibraltar to Castile. He was in turn deposed by their nephew Ismail I in 1314.

The downfall of Muhammad III and Nasr, and their deaths without an heir, also meant an end to the male line of descent from Muhammad I, the dynasty's founder. Ismail I and the subsequent sultans descended from Fatima, the daughter of Muhammad II and her husband Abu Said Faraj, a Nasrid from another branch (a nephew of Muhammad I). The Nasrid Emirate of Granada lasted as the only Muslim state in Spain for almost two more centuries, until its conquest by the Catholic Monarchs in 1492.

== Notes ==
Muhammad III of Granada Nasrid dynasty Cadet branch of the Banu Khazraj Born: 1257 Died: 1314
Regnal titles
Preceded by Muhammad II al-Faqih	Sultan of Granada; 1302–1309	Succeeded by Nasr
