= Hammu ibn Abd al-Haqq =

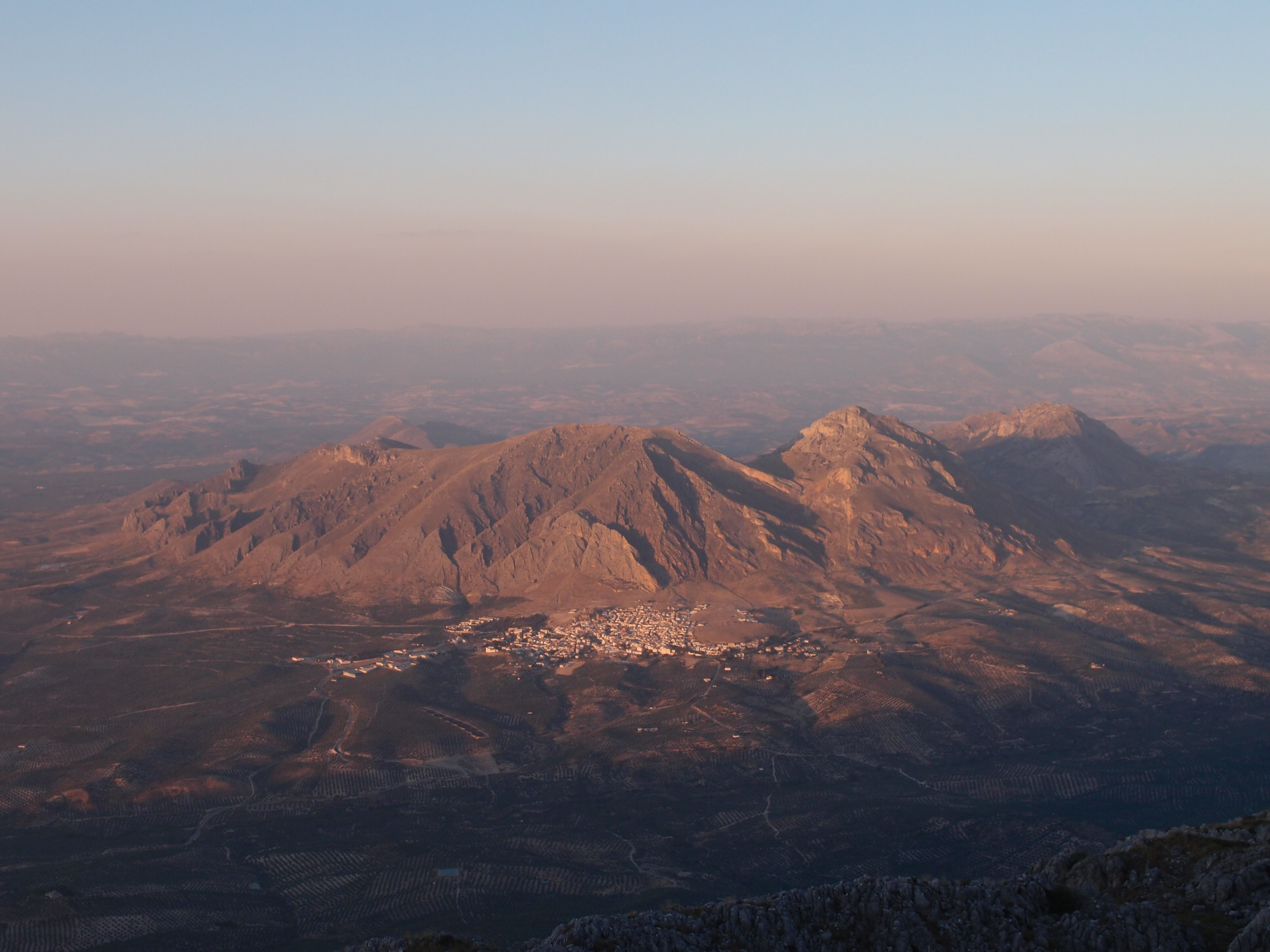
In April 1302, Hammu ibn Abd al-Haqq succeeded in taking Bedmar (pictured) for Muhammad III.

Hammu ibn Abd al-Haqq ibn Rahhu (Arabic: حمّو بن عبدالحق بن رحّو) was a Marinid prince who served as shaykh al-ghuzat (chief of the Volunteers of the Faith) in the Nasrid Emirate of Granada during the reigns of Muhammad III (r. 1302–1309) and Nasr (r. 1309–1314).

He unsuccessfully rebelled against the Marinid Sultan Abu al-Rabi Sulayman (r. 1289–1310) in North Africa. Like many dissident princes, he was exiled to Granada to join the "Volunteers of the Faith", a military corps made up of North Africans who fought to defend Muslims in the Iberian Peninsula. Under Muhammad III, he commanded the troops that captured Bedmar from Castile in April 1302, two weeks after the Sultan's accession. When another Marinid prince Uthman ibn Abi al-Ula entered the Nasrid service, he was given command of the Volunteers in Malaga and the western territories, while Hammu ibn al-Haqq kept the command in Granada. He kept the post after Muhammad III was deposed and replaced by his brother Nasr. When a rebellion broke out against Nasr in favor of his nephew Ismail I, Hammu remained loyal while Uthman sided with Ismail. The rebellion was ultimately successful, Nasr abdicated in 1314 while Hammu lost his post and followed Nasr to exile in Guadix.

== Sources ==
- Harvey, L. P. (1992). Islamic Spain, 1250 to 1500. Chicago: University of Chicago Press. ISBN 978-0-226-31962-9.
- Manzano Rodríguez, Miguel Angel (1992). La intervención de los Benimerines en la Península Ibérica (in Spanish). Editorial CSIC - CSIC Press. ISBN 978-84-00-07220-9.
