= Al-Rundi =

Al-Rundi (meaning: "from Ronda" (a Spanish town in Málaga)) may refer to:

- Salih ben Sharif Abu al-Baqa al-Rundi (1204–1285), Arabic poet
- Ibn Abbad al-Rundi (1333–1390), Sufi theologian
- Abu Abdallah ibn al-Hakim al-Rundi (died 1309), scholar
