= Sack of Martos (1325) =

Conflict between the Emirate of Granada and Crown of Castile

- Part of the Spanish Reconquista
- The Nasrid Emirate of Granada
Date	22 June – 6 July 1325
Location	Martos
Result	Granadan victory

Belligerents
Emirate of Granada	Crown of Castile: Order of Calatrava

Commanders and leaders
Ismail I of Granada	Unknown

Casualties and losses
Unknown	Defenders and inhabitants massacred or enslaved

The sack of Martos was a military engagement launched by the Granadan Sultan, Ismail I, against the city of Martos; he managed to capture the city after a short siege accompanied by a brutal sack.

== History ==
In 1325, the Granadan Sultan, ismail, launched his campaign against the city of Martos. During this time, the Kingdom of Castile was in conflict with its nobles. Seeing this, the Sultan launched an attack against Castile. His target was Martos, a bastion for the Order of Calatrava. The Sultan began the siege on 22 June; he ravaged the outskirts. During the siege, Ismail made use of early cannons. These new engines launched orbs of fire against the walls and towers. The walls weren't able to resist such an attack. In July 6, the Granadans assaulted the city after a bloody battle. The defenders were massacred, and its inhabitants were enslaved. The sack of the city proceeded. The 14th-century historian, Ibn al-Khatib, describes the sack:

The hands of the soldiers loosened against its inhabitants, whether male or female, old or young: the slaughter was cruel and the event detestable. The next morning piles of corpses arose, to whose peaks climbed muezzins [to call to prayer].

Shortly after his victory, Ismail began returning to Granada; however, he has a quarrel with his cousin, Muhammad bin Ismail. He conspired and assassinated him. The master of order was accused of failing to provide proper defenses to Martos.

== Sources ==
- O'Callaghan, Joseph F. (2011-03-17). The Gibraltar Crusade: Castile and the Battle for the Strait. University of Pennsylvania Press. ISBN 978-0-8122-0463-6.
- Murray, R. Dundas (1853). The cities and wild of Andalucia. R. Bentley.
- Vidal Castro, Francisco. "Ismail I". Diccionario Biográfico electrónico (in Spanish). Madrid: Real Academia de la Historia.
- Sabaté, Flocel (2015-09-04). Medieval Urban Identity: Health, Economy and Regulation. Cambridge Scholars Publishing. ISBN 978-1-4438-8152-4.
