= Alcázar Genil =

Historic building in Granada, Spain

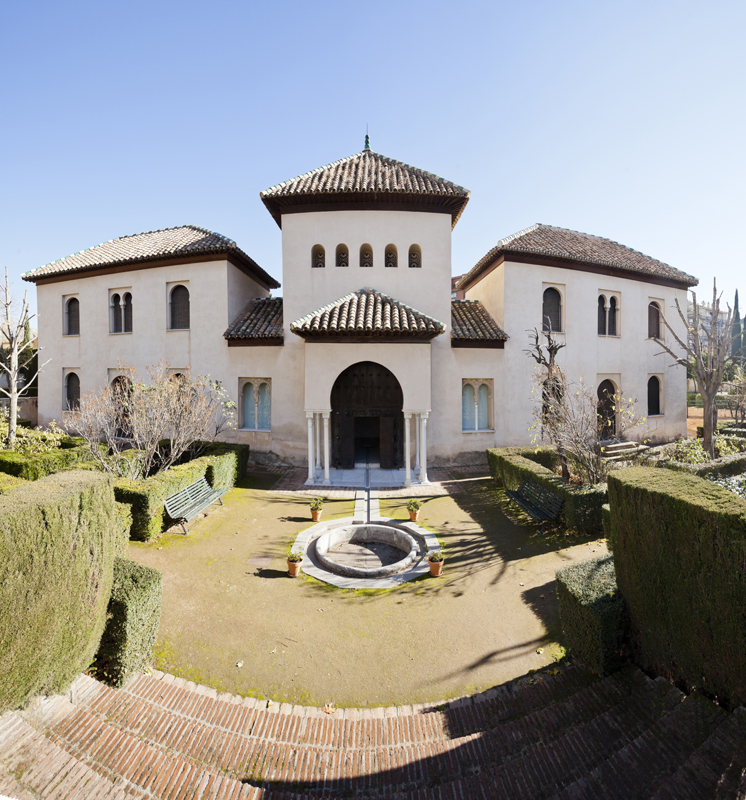
- Exterior of the remaining pavilion of the Alcázar Genil
- Former names: al-Qasr al-Sayyid

General information
- Type: palace
- Architectural style: Moorish
- Coordinates: 37°09′53.2″N 3°36′1.9″W
- Completed: 1218–19 CE
- Renovated: 14th century, expanded in 1892

The Alcázar Genil is a Muslim-era palace in the city of Granada, Spain. It was originally called al-Qasr al-Sayyid ("the palace of the lord") and is located beside the River Genil outside the city walls. Today, only a pavilion of the palace is preserved. It currently houses the Francisco Ayala Foundation.

== History ==
It was first built in 1218 or 1219 by Sayyid Ishaq ibn Yusuf, a member of the Almohad dynasty. The palace, built along the south shore of the Genil River, was located outside the city walls. It served as an almunia (from Arabic al-munya, meaning "farm"), a country villa that was used both as a private retreat for its elite owners as well as a farming estate with agricultural functions. A small ribat (religious retreat for Sufis) was also built nearby at the same time, consisting of a simple square hall covered by a sixteen-sided cupola with groin-vault squinches, with a sloped roof on the outside. This was later converted into a Christian hermitage and is now known as the Ermita de San Sebastián ("Hermitage of Saint Sebastian") or the rábita ("ribat").

In 1237, Muhammad I of the Nasrid dynasty took over Granada and the palace came under the new dynasty's possession. Muhammad I's grandson, Muhammad III (r. 1302–1309) temporarily lived here after he was dethroned, before he moved to Almuñécar. The decoration of the palace dates from the reign of Isma'il I (r. 1314–1325) or of Yusuf I (r. 1333–1354). It's possible that the current structure was also rebuilt at that time.

In 1892 the Spanish architect Rafael Contreras expanded the building by adding two wings on either side and a small porch on the front. The building was restored again in the 1980s and in 1994 by Pedro Salmerón Escobar.

== Architecture ==
Originally, the palace stood next to a large pool measuring 121 by 28 metres (397 by 92 ft), which formed part of an extensive water supply network used for agricultural irrigation. The pool may have also been used for aquatic games and displays. The original layout of the building, consisting of a central square chamber in the form of a qubba, with rectangular side chambers opening onto it, is an early example of a type of interior space which became common in Nasrid architecture. Only the central chamber of the palace was entered from the outside, such that the building was a relatively introverted space rather than one that was open to the gardens around it. Inside, the palace is decorated with carved stucco on its walls. The stucco decoration culminates in a cornice of muqarnas, above which is a ceiling consisting of a square wooden cupola painted with interlacing geometric motifs.

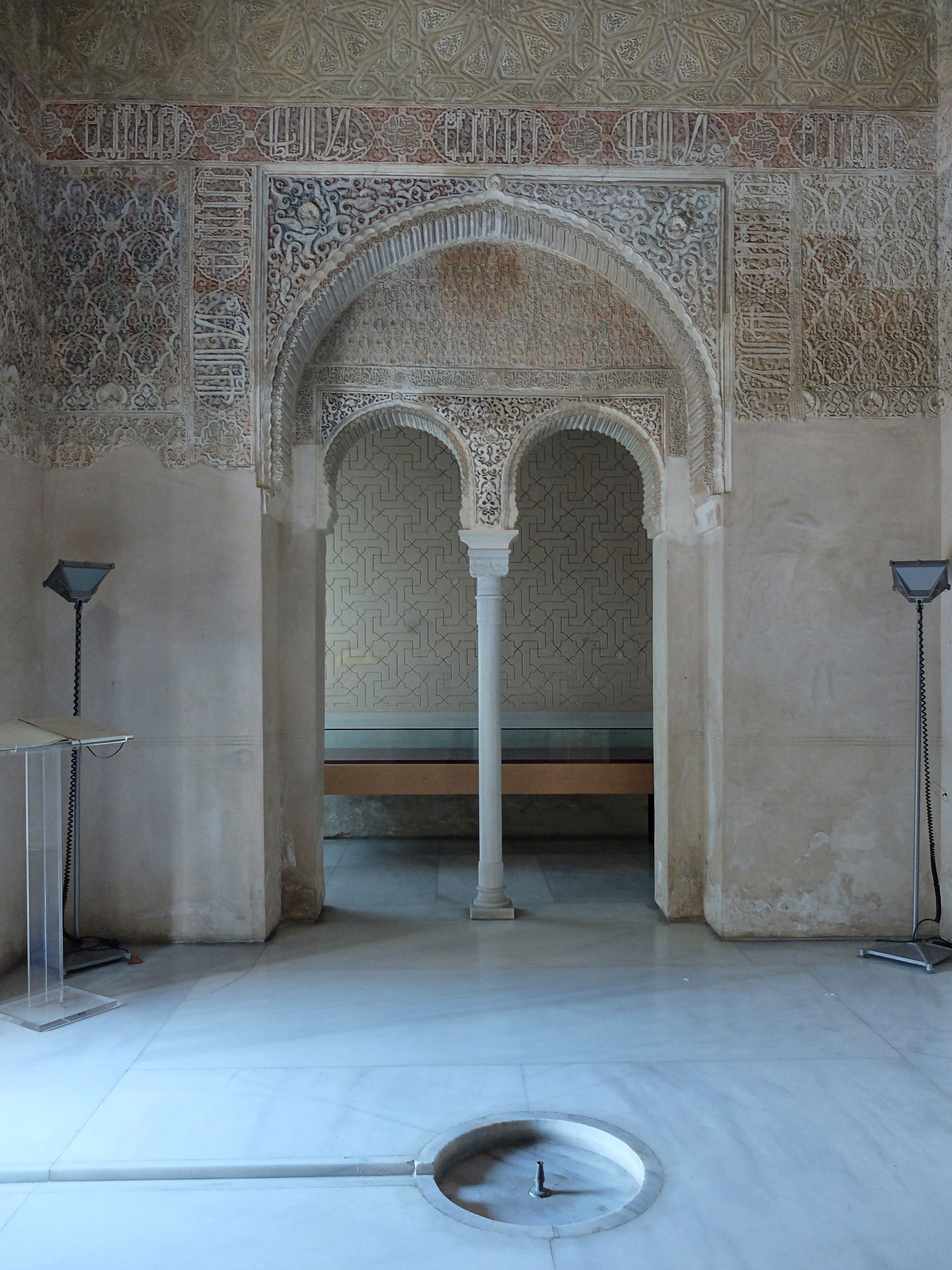
Interior of the central chamber, with floor fountain and arched entry to side chamber

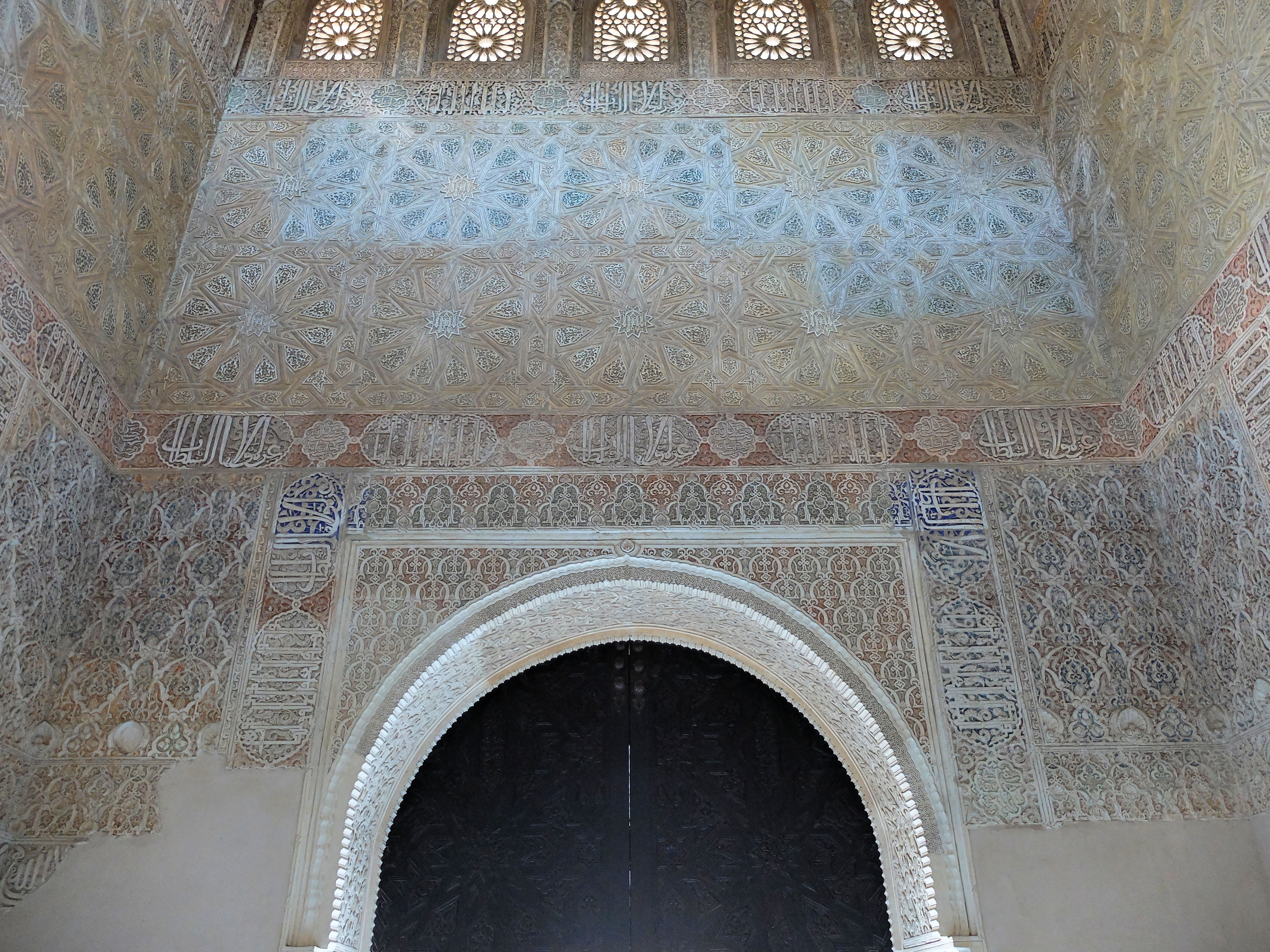
Carved stucco decoration on the walls of the central chamber

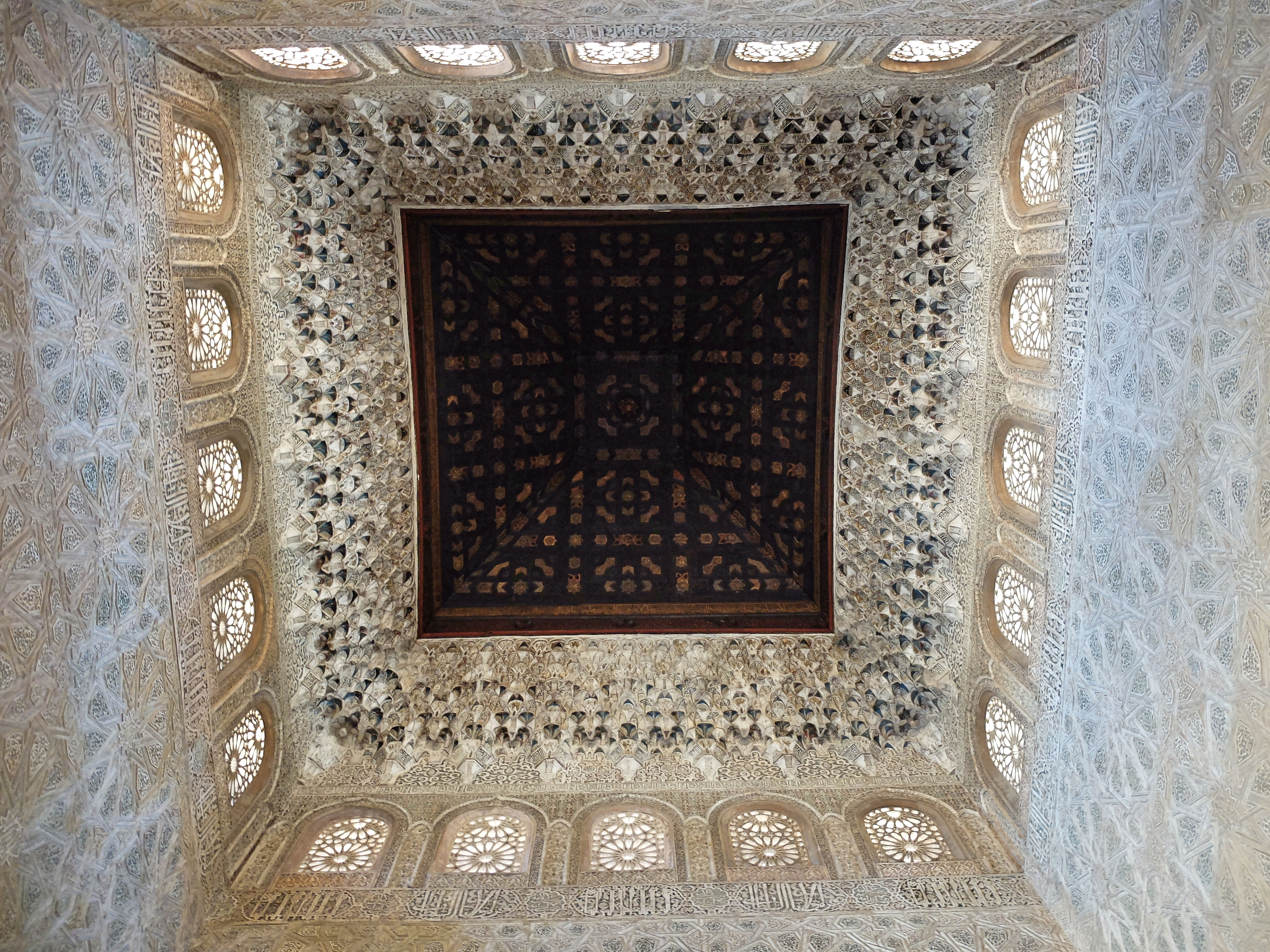
View towards the wooden cupola ceiling of the central chamber

== See also ==
- Cuarto Réal de Santo Domingo
