= Abu Abdallah ibn al-Hakim =

13th-century Vizier of Grenada

Vizier of Granada
- In office 1303–1309
- Monarch: Muhammad III of Granada
- Preceded by: Abu al-Sultan ibn al-Mun'im al-Dani
- Succeeded by: Atiq ibn al-Mawl

Personal details
- Born: Abū ʿAbd Allāh Muḥammad ibn Abd al-Rahman ibn al-Ḥakīm al-Lakhmī al-Rundī; 1261 Ronda
- Died: 14 March 1309 (aged 47–48) Granada

Abū ʿAbd Allāh Muḥammad ibn Abd al-Rahman ibn al-Ḥakīm al-Lakhmī al-Rundī (Arabic: أبوعبدالله محمد بن عبدالرحمن بن الحكيم اللخمي الرّندي) (1261 – 14 March 1309) was a scholar from Ronda who became a leading official of the Nasrid Emirate of Granada. He was born to the Banu al-Hakim family, a branch of the Abbadid dynasty. While his brothers ruled his home town, he went east to study in major cities of the Islamic world in 1284, returning two years later. In 1287, he entered service in the court chancery of Sultan Muhammad II (r. 1273–1302) as katib (secretary). In addition to secretarial and literary work, he also served as mediator to reconcile his brothers with the sultan when they rebelled. He became a co-vizier on the accession of Muhammad III (r. 1302–1309), and became sole vizier and titled dhu al-wizaratayn ("holder of the two vizierates") when his co-vizier died in 1303. His power grew and at the end of his life he was the actual ruler of the emirate. He orchestrated a foreign policy change, first by making peace with Castile, and then taking Ceuta in North Africa from the Marinids. These actions backfired and soon Granada was confronted with a triple alliance of Castile, Aragon, and the Marinids. The citizens of Granada, angered by his policy and his extravagant lifestyle, invaded his palace and that of the sultan on 14 March 1309. The sultan was deposed, and Abu Abdallah was killed by his political rival Atiq ibn al-Mawl.

== Early life and origin ==
Muḥammad ibn Abd al-Rahman was born in 1261 (660 AH) in Ronda. He was a descendant of a branch of the Abbadid dynasty, which had ruled the Taifa of Seville in the 11th century. Abu Abdallah's ancestors moved to Ronda (Arabic Runda). One of them had become a doctor (hakim), after whom the entire lineage was subsequently named. Abu Abdallah had two older brothers, Abu Zakariya and Abu Ishaq, who remained in Ronda. They had large estates there and became the town's semi-autonomous rulers, recognizing first the overlordship of the Marinids and later of the Nasrids.

Abu Abdallah left his home town in 1284 for the eastern Islamic world, where he studied for many years. He and his friend, Muhammad ibn Rushayd of Ceuta, visited and studied in Mecca, Medina, Damascus, and several cities of North Africa, earning diplomas and assembling a considerable library. He particularly loved the study of poetry and often recited his own verses to Ibn Rushayd.

== Service under Muhammad II ==
He returned to Ronda in 1286, while his friend continued his journey. When the Sultan, Muhammad II (r. 1273–1302), visited Ronda shortly after his return, Abu Abdallah recited a qasida praising the Sultan's recent victory over the rebel Banu Ashqilula. His education impressed the Sultan, who invited him to enter his service in the capital, which he accepted in 1287. Abu Abdallah began his career in the court chancery as katib al-insha and then as sahib al-qalam al-a'la, the highest post in the chancery, responsible for composing and editing royal correspondence. He demonstrated his literary skill in writing a risala about the Sultan's conquest of Quesada from Castile (1295). On another occasion, some verses satirizing the ruling dynasty circulated in the capital and were attributed to Abu Abdallah. The crown prince, the future Muhammad III, ordered the katib to be severely punished forcing him to flee and hide in abandoned buildings. He returned to his job only after the prince's anger had subsided.

When his brothers defied Muhammad II and declared for the Marinid sultan Abu Yaqub Yusuf, and a Nasrid attempt to retake Ronda by force failed, Abu Abdallah was sent to negotiate with his brothers. The negotiations appear to have been successful because they ended with the brothers resubmitting to Muhammad II and being allowed to continue ruling the city. The Banu al-Hakim family were the governors of Ronda until its conquest by Isabella I and Ferdinand II in 1485.

== Rise and downfall under Muhammad III ==
Muhammad II died in 1302 and was succeeded by his son Muhammad III (r. 1302–1309), a sultan with a mixed reputation for high culture, cruelty and a sense of humour. The new sultan appointed Abu Abdallah as co-vizier along with his father's vizier Abu al-Sultan ibn al-Mun'im al-Dani. The old vizier wanted the qa'id (military chief) Atiq ibn al-Mawl to succeed him on his death as the sole vizier. However, after Abu al-Sultan's death in 1303, Muhammad III named Abu Abdallah as vizier anyway. Because he controlled the two powerful posts of vizier and katib, he received the title dhu al-wizaratayn ("holder of the two vizierates").

As dhu al-wizaratayn, Abu Abdallah's power grew considerably, and at the end of Muhammad III's reign he was regarded as the actual ruler of the realm. It is unclear exactly when or how he assumed absolute power, but it was due partly to the Sultan's blindness (or poor eyesight). In any case, Granada's foreign policy changed dramatically during Muhammad III's reign and Abu Abdallah's vizierate. The Sultan inherited a war against the Christian Crown of Castile, as well as an alliance with the Christian Kingdom of Aragon and the Muslim Marinid state. Muhammad II had captured several fortresses in the Castilian frontiers, and the new sultan followed up with a conquest of Bedmar two weeks after his accession. However, Granada soon sued for peace, resulting in the Treaty of Cordoba of August 1303. Signed by Abu Abdallah in the name of the Sultan, it established Muhammad III as a tribute-paying vassal of Castile, in exchange for the recognition of Granada's war gains. This antagonized Aragon, which, deprived of an ally, had to sign its own treaty later with Castile. In 1306, Granada conquered Ceuta in North Africa from the Marinids, and it was Abu Abdallah rather than the Sultan who visited the city after its conquest. In the short term, this strengthened Granada's control on the Strait of Gibraltar, but this upset Granada's neighbours so much that Aragon, Castile and the Marinids formed a coalition against it. Each of the three powers was larger than Granada, and they began their preparations for war.

At court, Abu Abdallah had become the most powerful man in the realm. The court poets dedicated their verses to him rather than the Sultan, and he lived an extravagant life in a palace full of riches. However, the people of Granada despised him because of his disastrous foreign policy and his lifestyle. The qa'id Atiq ibn al-Mawl, whom he had passed over for the post of vizier, began a conspiracy against Abu Abdallah and Muhammad III.

=== Death ===
On Eid al-Fitr of 708 AH (14 March 1309), an angry mob of Granada's citizens attacked the palaces of both the Vizier and the Sultan. Abu Abdallah's palace was sacked, and he was killed by Ibn al-Mawl; his corpse was defiled by the mob and lost so that he could not be buried. The Sultan was allowed to leave but forced to abdicate in favor of his brother Nasr; he was permitted to live in Almuñécar. Ibn al-Mawl became the new sultan's vizier, but he soon had to flee to North Africa because he felt his life was threatened.

Later, the historian al-Maqqari (c. 1578–1632) wrote a poem, which according to modern historians María Jesús Rubiera Mata and L. P. Harvey could only refer to Abu Abdallah ibn al-Hakim:

Unjustly they killed you, transgressing all decent bounds.
and your battered corpse they cast away, but such was your hidden fate.
and if, my lord, you have no grave, still your tomb is in our hearts.

== Sources ==
- Carrasco Manchado, Ana I. (2009). "Al-Andalus Nazarí". Al-Andalus. Historia de España VI (in Spanish). Madrid: Ediciones Istmo. pp. 391–485. ISBN 978-84-7090-431-8..
- Fierro, Maribel (2014). "Ways of Connecting with the Past: Genealogies of Nasrid Granada". In Savant, Sarah Bowen; de Felipe, Helena (eds.). Genealogy and Knowledge in Muslim Societies: Understanding the Past. Edinburgh: Edinburgh University Press. pp. 71–88. ISBN 978-0-7486-4498-8.
- Harvey, L. P. (1992). Islamic Spain, 1250 to 1500. Chicago: University of Chicago Press. ISBN 978-0-226-31962-9.
- Rubiera Mata, María Jesús (1969). "El Du l-Wizaratayn Ibn al-Hakim de Ronda" (PDF). Al-Andalus (in Spanish). 34. Madrid and Granada: Spanish National Research Council: 105–121.
