= Hermandad General de Andalucía =

The Hermandad General de Andalucía ("general brotherhood of Andalusia"), was a regional confederation of various jurisdictions in Andalusia, the southern region of the Crown of Castile, existing since 1295 or 1297 and reaching its peak power between 1312 and 1325. It was formed by the towns of Seville, Cordoba, Ecija, and Jerez, on the frontiers with the Emirate of Granada, after the accession of the nine-year old Ferdinand IV (r. 1295–1312). The town acted to form the confederation because they felt that rule of the young king left them vulnerable to raids from Granada or North Africa. It gradually became irrelevant when Ferdinand came of age, but was revived after the accession of Ferdinand's one-year-old son Alfonso XI (r. 1312–1350). The hermandad met in Palma del Río in May 1313, raising funds for the regional defense and enacting a series of articles. After the death of the king's regents Infante Peter and Infante John at the Battle of the Vega of Granada (1319), the hermandad assumed more sovereign-like powers. In the same year, it concluded a truce with Granada and declared that it would not accept anyone as new regent if appointed without their consent, and created a budget for the regional defense. The hermanded concluded an eight-year peace treaty with Ismail I of Granada in June 1320, without prior authorization of the crown. On 13 August 1325, Alfonso XI was declared of age and assumed control of his government. He ordered the dissolution of the hermandad which he perceived as a challenge to his authority.

== Bibliography ==
- García Fernández, Manuel (1985). "La Hermandad General de Andalucía durante la minoría de Alfonso XI de Castilla, 1312-1325". Historia. Instituciones. Documentos (in Spanish). 12: 311–376. ISSN 0210-7716.
- O'Callaghan, Joseph F. (2011). The Gibraltar Crusade: Castile and the Battle for the Strait. Philadelphia: University of Pennsylvania Press. ISBN 978-0-8122-0463-6.
