= Battle of the Vega of Granada =

Disaster of the Vega de Granada
- Part of the Spanish Reconquista
- The Nasrid Emirate of Granada
Date	25 June 1319 (6 Jumada al-Awwal 719 AH)
Location	Pinos Puente, Vega de Granada, Spain 37°15′N 3°45′W
Result	Granadan victory

Belligerents
Kingdom of Castile; Crown of Castile; Order of Santiago; Order of Calatrava	Emirate of Granada

Commanders and leaders
Infante Peter †; Infante John †	Ismail I of Granada; Uthman ibn Abi al-Ula

Strength
Unknown	Unknown

Casualties and losses
Heavy	Unknown

The Battle of Sierra Elvira, also called the Disaster of the Vega de Granada, was a battle of the Spanish Reconquista fought near the city of Granada on 25 June 1319 (6 Jumada al-Awwal 719 AH). The battle was fought between the troops of the Emirate of Granada and those of the Kingdom of Castile. The battle resulted in a catastrophic defeat for Castile.

== Historical Context ==
The Kingdom of Castile periodically conducted raids into the Emirate of Granada in order to collect plunder. Notwithstanding temporary agreements and truces with the Nasrid rulers, these expeditions were often under the leadership of the rulers of Castile. They were often true military expeditions with large armies numbering thousands of men.

In the late 1310s Castile was ruled by King Alfonso XI, a minor, under the joint regency of his grandmother Maria de Molina, of his granduncle infante John and of his uncle infante Peter. Infante Peter had led minor raids into Granadine territory in 1316 and 1317 and an agreement had been reached with the nobility of Castile in the Cortes held at Medina del Campo in 1318 for a new expedition to begin in the late spring of 1319. This expedition was to be a large one, blessed by Pope John XXII who authorized it as a crusade and conceded the rebate to the crown of some of the Church tithes in order to finance it.

The troops assembled in Cordoba in June 1319 and crossed the border under the command of infante Peter. With him were the Grand Masters of the Orders of Santiago, Calatrava and Alcántara and the Archbishops of Toledo and Seville. Infante John followed with his own troops. The two infantes resolved to march deep into Granada and to reach the Vega de Granada, the area surrounding the city characterized by its wealth and fertility. During the march the army skirmished with Moorish troops and captured several towns, collecting large amounts of plunder.

== The battle ==
The large Castilian army encamped in the Vega de Granada and, after looting the immediate area, resolved to return to Castile satisfied with the collected booty. A siege of the city of Granada was deemed impossible at the time. The withdrawal started on 25 June 1319, in very hot weather; infante Peter led the vanguard while infante John commanded the rearguard.

At this point Sultan Ismail decided to strike. A large force of elite Moorish cavalry, the "Volunteers of the Faith", led by Uthman ibn Abi al-Ula, exited from Granada and started harassing the retreating Castilians of infante John. These minor attacks turned into a general assault when the Granadines realized the Castilians were losing their cohesion during their retreat and were unable to fight back effectively.

Infante John requested the aid of infante Peter, but Peter, according to chroniclers, was at first dissuaded from this by his companions. When he finally decided to help his uncle, he fell from his horse as he led his men, and was trampled and killed. At this point the vanguard thought only of flight and to reach the Castilian border; in their panic, many men drowned while attempting to cross the river Genil in full armour. The unsupported rearguard collapsed, with infante John falling victim probably to stroke or heat stroke leading to a spectacular Moorish victory.

Most of the fighting took place in the present-day municipality of Pinos Puente. A hill on the battlefield was given the name Cerro de los Infantes ("Hill of the Infantes").

== Aftermath ==
Numbers are not available for the Castilian losses but they had to be quite large. The border for some years after 1319 was undermanned and the Granadines could raid the southern Castilian territories almost at will. Maria de Molina remained as sole regent and was later joined by her other son, infante Philip and by a distant relative, the celebrated Juan Manuel.

In 1325 Alfonso XI started to rule alone and soon started his lifelong, and in the end victorious, struggle with the Nasrid kingdom and its later ally, the Marinids of Fez, which was also intended to avenge the 1319 defeat.

== Bibliography ==
- Bleiberg, German, ed. (1979). Diccionario de Historia de España (3 vols.). Alianza Editorial, Madrid.
- Ladero Queisada, Miguel Ángel (1989). Granada. Historia de un país islámico. Editorial Gredos, Madrid.
- Suárez Fernández, Luis (1975). Historia de España Antigua y Media (2 vols.). Ediciones Rialp, Madrid.
- A rich bibliography is available in the Spanish Wikipedia
