= Volunteers of the Faith =

- Arabic: الغزاة المجاهدين, romanized: al-ghuzāt al-mujāhidīn
- Active: 13th and 14th centuries
- Countries: Marinid Morocco (origin)
- Allegiance: Emirate of Granada
- Main HQ: Fuengirola
- Engagements: Reconquista

Commanders
- Notable commanders: Hammu ibn Abd al-Haqq; Uthman ibn Abi al-Ula

The Volunteers of the Faith (Arabic: الغزاة المجاهدين, romanized: al-ghuzāt al-mujāhidīn, lit. 'warriors of the jihad') was a military institution of the Emirate of Granada, composed by soldiers recruited from Zenata Berbers who were exiled from the Marinid Sultanate, to defend the Emirate against the Christian kingdoms of the Iberian Peninsula.

Many of them volunteered because they saw the defense of Muslims as their religious duty. Although North African volunteers appear in the Iberian peninsula already in the 11th century under the term ghuzāt, recruitment was expanded during the last years of Muhammad I of Granada (r. 1238–1273), and they were institutionalised and further expanded by his son Muhammad II al-Faqih (r. 1273–1302). Over time, the Volunteers eclipsed Granada's indigenous troops and became its main military force, numbering 10,000 by the end of Muhammad II's rule.

Their leader, the shaykh al-ghuzat, held an influential position in the emirate's politics, as did regional ghuzat commanders appointed in major cities such as Guadix, Ronda, and Malaga.

== History and function ==
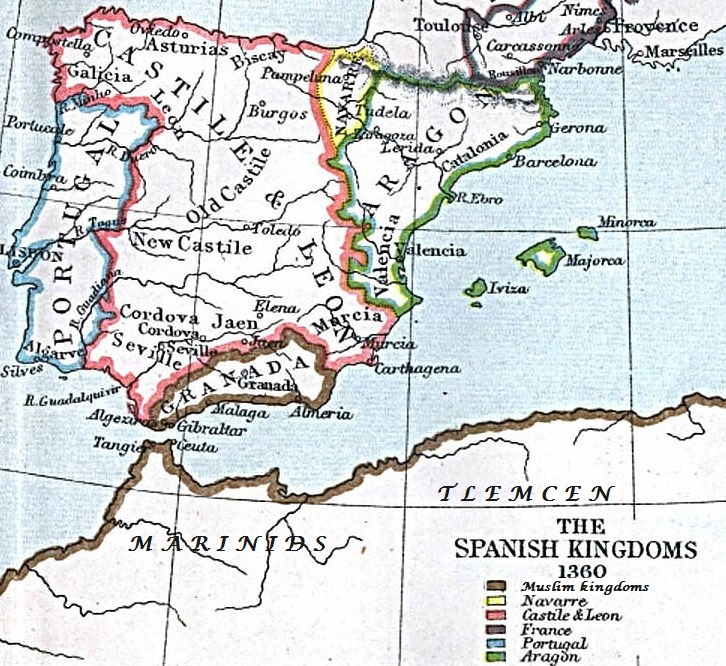
The Iberian Peninsula and North Africa in the 14th century.

The Nasrid Volunteers have their origin in the complex relationship between the Nasrid emirate and the Marinid dynasty that ruled North Africa from Fez: many of the Volunteers were dissatisfied or rebellious Marinid factions, often led by a dissident member of the Marinid dynasty, who sought refuge in Granada after their defeat. Although the structure of the Nasrid army is still unclear, it is likely that each group of Volunteers retained their separate identity and leadership, continuing to serve under the same prince and his family who had brought them from North Africa. The main headquarters of the Volunteers was located at Fuengirola.

For the Marinid sultans this was a useful release valve, ridding them of potentially troublesome elements and rivals for the throne, but also allowing the Marinid regime to continue to portray itself as a defender of the Muslims of al-Andalus and continuator of the jihad traditions of its Almohad and Almoravid predecessors. For the Volunteers themselves, and especially their leaders, Nasrid service presented a safe refuge, especially given the willingness of the Nasrid emirs to accord them considerable autonomy, and a chance to gather forces and make contacts to renew their attempts to overthrow the sultan in Fez. Finally, the Nasrid emirs benefited considerably from the infusion of military strength, but also used the presence of the rival Marinid factions, and the threat of allowing them to return to North Africa, to exercise pressure on the sultans in Fez.

As the Volunteers quickly became major power-brokers in the Nasrid emirate, the shaykh al-ghuzat often became a kingmaker. As a result, Emir Muhammad V (r. 1354–1359, 1362–1391) suppressed the office during his second reign, sometime between 1369 and 1374. From that point on, the Volunteers were under the direct command of the Nasrid ruler, and lost their previous autonomy and political power.

== Name ==
The Arabic name al-ghuzat al-mujahidin means "warriors of the jihad." The name "Volunteers of the Faith" originates from the phrase used in Baron de Slane's 19-century French translation of Ibn Khaldun's Kitāb al-ʿibar discussing this military group. The phrase is used by historians up to modern times.

== See also ==
- Uthman ibn Abi al-Ula

== Sources ==
- Arié, Rachel (1973). L'Espagne musulmane au temps des Nasrides (1232-1492) (in French). Paris: E. de Boccard. OCLC 3207329.
- Fancy, Hussein (2016). The Mercenary Mediterranean: Sovereignty, Religion, and Violence in the Medieval Crown of Aragon. University of Chicago Press. ISBN 978-0-2263-2964-2.
- Harvey, L. P. (1990). Islamic Spain, 1250 to 1500. Chicago: University of Chicago Press. ISBN 978-0-226-31962-9.
- Kennedy, Hugh (2014). Muslim Spain and Portugal: A Political History of Al-Andalus. London: Routledge. ISBN 978-1-317-87041-8.
- Manzano Rodríguez, Miguel Angel (1992). La intervención de los Benimerines en la Península Ibérica (in Spanish). Editorial CSIC - CSIC Press. ISBN 978-84-00-07220-9.
- Nicolle, David; McBride, Angus (2001). The Moors & The Islamic West. 7th–15th Centuries AD. Oxford: Osprey Publishing. ISBN 1-85532-964-6.
