= Alicún =

- Municipality
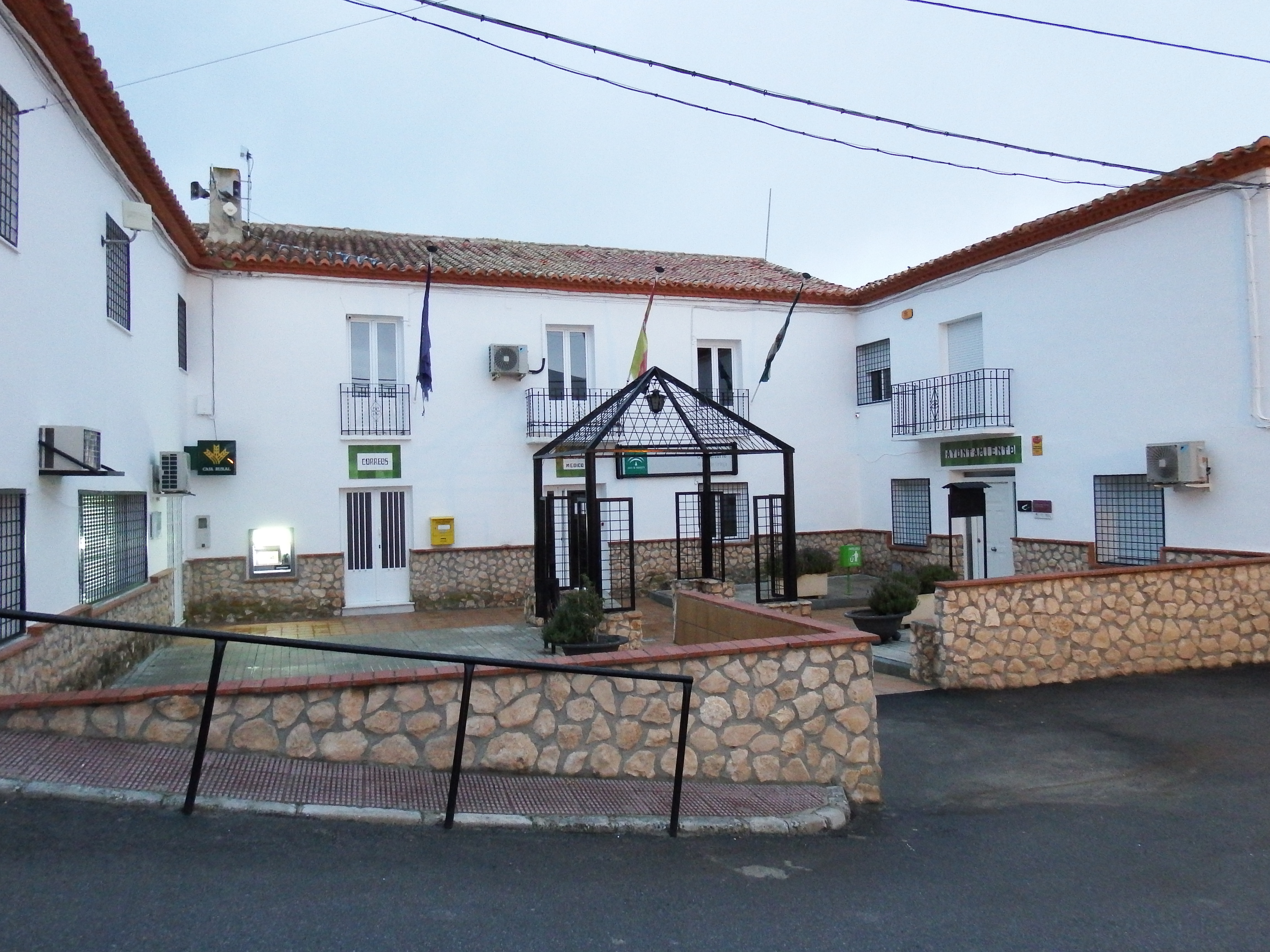
- Town hall

- Flag Seal

- Location within Spain
- Coordinates: 36°57′59″N 2°36′7″W
- Country: Spain
- A. community: Andalucía
- Province: Almería

Government
  - Mayor: Antonio Navarro

Area
  - Total: 5.873 km^{2} (2.268 sq mi)

Population (January 1, 2021)
  - Total: 203
  - Density: 34.56/km^{2} (89.5/sq mi)
- Time zone: UTC+01:00
- Postal code: 04409
- MCN: 04012
- Website: Official website

Alicún is a municipality of Almería province, in the autonomous community of Andalusia, Spain.

== Demographics ==
Historical population
Year	Pop.	±%
1999	241	—
2000	236	−2.1%
2001	235	−0.4%
2002	235	+0.0%
2003	242	+3.0%
2004	247	+2.1%
2005	253	+2.4%
Source: INE (Spain)

== See also ==
- List of municipalities in Almería
