= Rachel Arié =

French historian (1924 – 2018)

Rachel Arié (October 25, 1924 – December 12, 2018) was a French historian who focuses on Islamic Spain, in particular the period of the Nasrid Emirate of Granada. By 1992, she was director of research at the French National Center for Scientific Research and doctor honoris causa at the University of Granada.

== Biography ==
Rachel Arié was born in Cairo, Egypt, on October 25, 1924.

She spent part of her childhood in Spain. She studied Arabic (classical and dialectal) at the Institut national des langues et civilisations orientales and history at the Université Sorbonne Nouvelle. She was awarded the agrégation in Arabic in 1959. Between 1963 and 1966, she was a guest researcher at Casa de Velázquez.

She defended her thesis on Muslim Spain at the time of the Nasrids (1232-1492) in 1973.

Since 1992, she has been Director of Research at the French National Centre for Scientific Research. She also holds an honorary doctorate from the University of Granada.

She died in the 17th arrondissement of Paris on December 12, 2018.

== Bibliography ==
- Fernández-Puertas, Antonio (1992). "Review of L'Espagne musulmane au temps des Naṣrīdes (1232-1492) by Rachel Arié". Journal of the Royal Asiatic Society. 2 (2). Cambridge University Press on behalf of the Royal Asiatic Society of Great Britain and Ireland: 273–275. doi:10.1017/S1356186300002583. JSTOR 25182528.
- Fernández-Puertas, Antonio (2006). "Review of Historia y Cultura de la Granada Nazarí by Rachel Arié". Journal of the Royal Asiatic Society. 16 (2). Cambridge University Press on behalf of the Royal Asiatic Society of Great Britain and Ireland: 199–201. JSTOR 25188626.
