= Banu al-Azafi =

North African noble family

The Banu al-ʿAzafi (Arabic: بنو العزفي), or the ʿAzafids, was a noble family in the North African city of Ceuta (Arabic: Sabta).

In 654 AH (1256/57 AD) Abu al-Qasim al-Azafi, a member of the dynasty, became the ruler of the city after expelling the governor of the Almohad caliph Umar al-Murtada. Afterwards, the dynasty were the de facto rulers of the city although they later acknowledged the Marinids as their sovereign.

In 1304 they rebelled against the Marinids, but this independence was short-lived as the city was conquered by the fleet of Nasrid Granada in May 1306. In 1309 Granada returned the city to the Marinids and in 1311 Yahya al-Azafi was made the governor of Ceuta and the Azafids returned to the city.

After the death of Yahya (date unknown between 1322 and 1328), order broke down in the city under the rule of his son Abu al-Qasim. At the invitation of the people, Marinid forces marched into the city in 1327 or 1328, ending its autonomy and putting it under the direct rule of Abu Sa'id Uthman II.
