= Gate of Elvira =

Coordinates: 37°10′56″N 3°36′01″W

- Puerta primitiva de entrada a la Ciudad de Granada (Spanish)
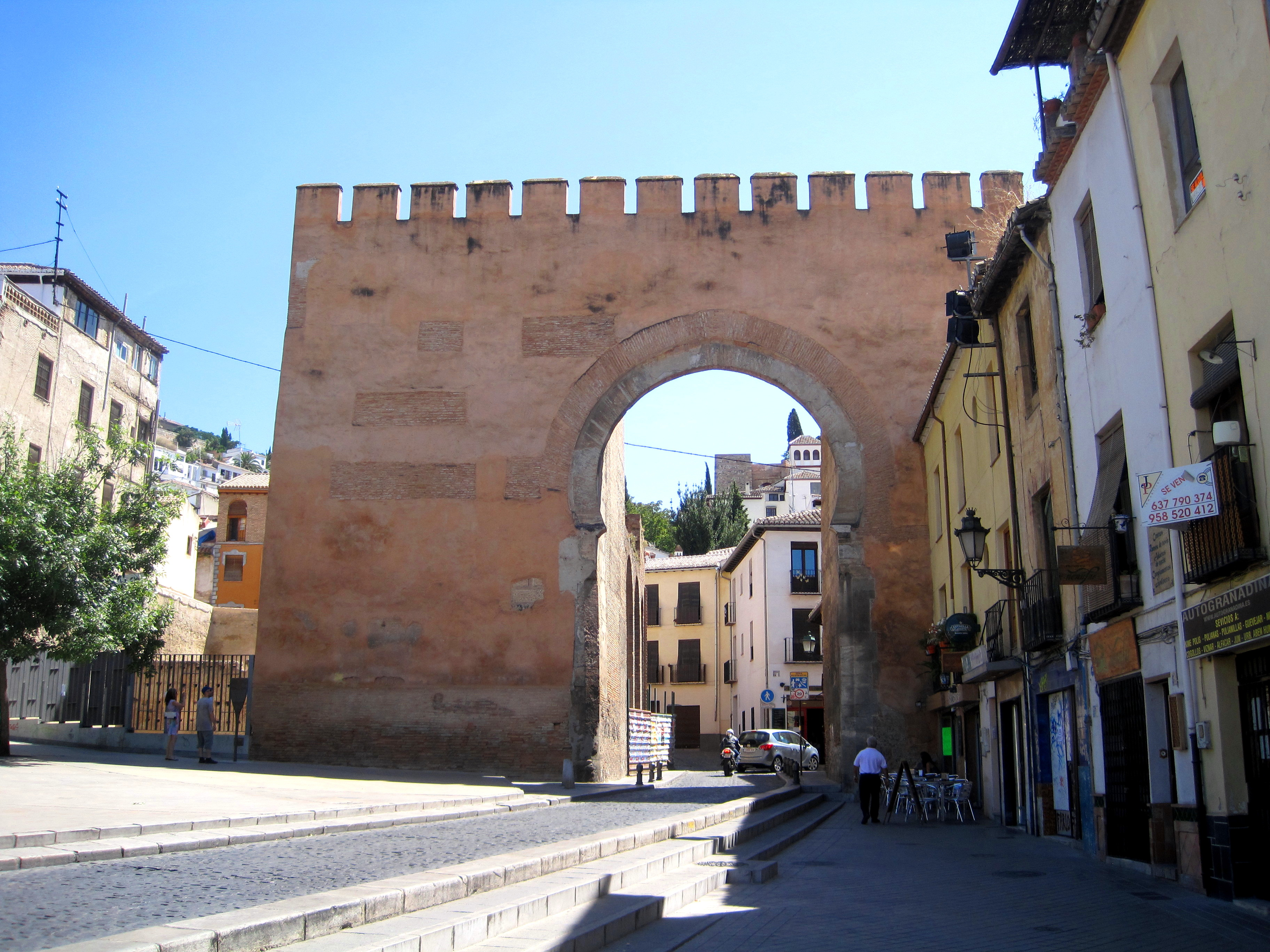

- Location within Spain
- Location: Granada, Spain

Spanish Cultural Heritage
- Official name: Puerta de Elvira (puerta primitiva de entrada a la Ciudad de Granada)
- Type: Non-movable
- Criteria: Monument
- Designated: 1896
- Reference no.: RI-51-0000009-00001

The Gate of Elvira (Spanish: Puerta de Elvira) is an arch located in Granada, Spain. It was declared Bien de Interés Cultural in 1896. It is located at the beginning of Calle Elvira (Elvira Street), on the edge of the Albaicín neighbourhood.

The gate was formerly known as Bāb Ilbīra in Arabic. It was originally part of the 11th-century Zirid walls, but in the 14th century it was rebuilt into a heavily-fortified structure in order to be incorporated into the new Nasrid extension of the walls. Only a part of the gate remains today. A large Muslim cemetery, known as the Ibn Malik Cemetery, formerly existed outside this gate. The present-day Royal Hospital (Hospital Real) stands over a part of this former cemetery.

== See also ==
- List of Bien de Interés Cultural in the Province of Granada
