= Leonard Patrick Harvey =

British historian

- Born: 25 February 1929; United Kingdom
- Died: 4 August 2018 (aged 89); Wellington, New Zealand
- Scientific career
- Fields: Islamic studies, Spanish Studies, Aljamiado
- Workplaces: Oxford, London

Leonard Patrick Harvey (often credited L. P. Harvey, 25 February 1929 – 4 August 2018) was a British historian and professor. He held lectureships in Spanish at Oxford University (1956–58), Southampton (1958–60), and Queen Mary College, London (1960–63), was Head of the Spanish Department at Queen Mary College from 1963 to 1973 (being appointed Professor in 1967) and Cervantes Professor of Spanish at King's College, London, in 1983, until his retirement in 1990.

== Biography ==
His fields of academic specialization were Arabic and Islamic studies, Mudejars and Moriscos, and the Islamic heritage on Spanish medieval and modern Literature. After his retirement, he took up a visiting appointment at the Oxford Centre for Islamic Studies, until he decided to move to New Zealand, where he lived in retirement. He died in Wellington on 4 August 2018. His wife Maureen Harvey (née Rawcliffe) died in 2000.

== Works ==
He published works over different themes: Islamic Spain 1250–1500, aljamiado literature, Muslims in Spain 1500–1614. Among the authors he wrote on are Ibn Battuta, Cervantes, Mancebo de Arévalo, and Baray de Reminjo. Some biographic sketch and his bibliographic production can be found in the volume dedicated to him in the review Sharq al-Andalus, 16–17 (1999–2002) – especially in the bibliographic article by Luis Fernando Bernabé Pons (pp. 13–20).

=== Muslims In Spain, 1500–1614 ===
Harvey published his book Muslims In Spain, 1500–1614 in 2006, examining Muslims of Spain in the period between Rebellion of the Alpujarras (1499–1501) and the expulsion of the Moriscos (1609–1614). According to historian Tamar Herzog writing in The International History Review, the book is written in "clear and precise language" addressed to non-specialists, and "answers many important questions". Herzog also compared the book to Benzion Netanyahu's 1995 book The Origins of Spanish Inquisition which analyzed the history of Jews and conversos of Spain in the same era, in the same way as Harvey did with Muslims.

Historian Trevor Dadson, writing in The Times Literary Supplement said that the book synthesized a "mass of information" mostly in Spanish and made it available to English-speaking reader. However, Dadson criticized the book's "few weaknesses", including inadequately answering the question of how widespread the practice of crypto-Islam was during the period, over-reliance on incorrect secondary sources, and for "skating over" the fact that many Moriscos were assimilated. The Times Literary Supplement later published Harvey's response to Dadson, in which he defended the book saying that the book does talk about the assimilated Moriscos, and that he brought "abundant, overwhelming" evidence from the Muslims' literature and from Inquisition trial records indicating that most of the nominal converts clung to the Islamic faith in secret.
