= 14th & 15th century Africa =

History of Africa from 1301 to 1500

During the 200 year period between 1301 and 1500 (the 14th and 15th century) the main civilizations and kingdoms in Africa were the Mali Empire, Kingdom of Kongo, Ife Empire, Benin Kingdom, Songhai Empire, Hausa City-states, Wolof Empire, Great Zimbabwe, Kingdom of Makuria, Kanem Empire, Ethiopian Empire, Kilwa Sultanate, Kingdom of Mapungubwe, Kingdom of Mutapa, and the Ajuran Sultanate. These kingdoms flourished in the first part of this period, especially the Mali Empire, which saw a cultural flowering within its empire centred on the University of Timbuktu.

== Trans-Saharan Trade ==
The years between 1100 ce and 1600 ce were known as the "golden age" of trade, when West African gold was in high demand. This led to an increase in the need and use for trade routes. From 1300 the Trans-Saharan trade routes were used for trade, travel, and scholarship.

Much of what scholars know of the Trans-Saharan trade routes comes from the historical writings of Muslim scholars such as Ibn Battuta and Leo Africanus who both crossed the Sahara Desert in the 14th and 15th centuries. These literary narratives combined with archaeological data provide much insight into 14th century trade.

=== Geography ===
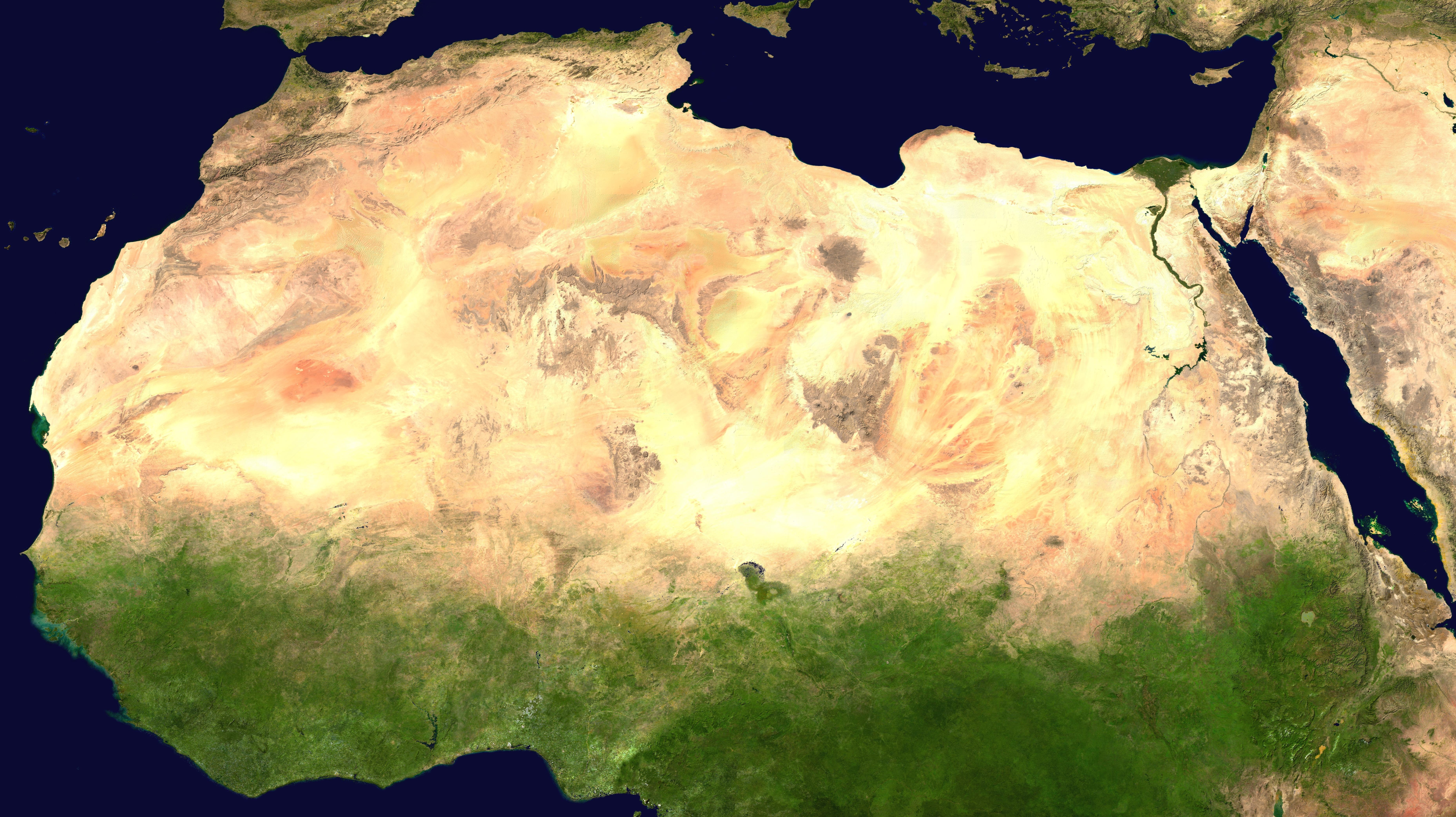
Satellite image of North Africa, showing the Sahara Desert.

Throughout the 14th century, much of African trade revolved around the Trans-Saharan trade routes. Geographically, the Sahara Desert extends over 3.6 million square miles and is the second-largest desert on the planet behind Antarctica. While the Sahara Desert was often viewed as a barrier between the African countries, it actually linked them together rather than separated them.

==== Empires ====
While trade along the Trans-Sahara trade route was common in the 14th century, it was highly dependent on the powerful African Empires, such as the Mali Empire, Kingdom of Kongo, Benin Kingdom, Hausa City-states, Ife Empire, Great Zimbabwe, Ethiopian Empire, Kilwa Sultanate, and the Ajuran Sultanate.

=== Muslim Influence ===
==== Ibn Battuta ====
An artist's representation of Ibn Battuta.

In 1352–53, Ibn Battuta embarked on a pilgrimage from Morocco to the Mali empire. Throughout his travels, he described many aspech the salt mines of Taghaza. The town of Takeda in the Niger Bend was a centre for copper mining and trade in Egyptian goods, like cloth. The routes from Morocco to Egypt were large distribution centres for gold.

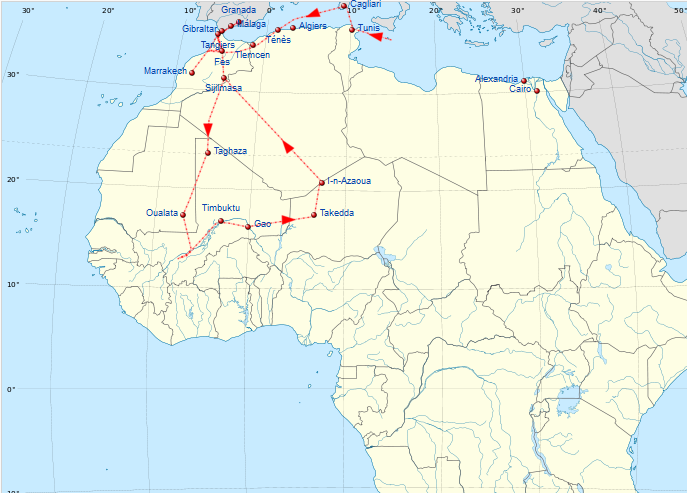
Map of Ibn Battuta's route into West Africa

In his memoirs, Battuta also described the dangers of the trade routes. It took months for merchants to cross the Sahara Desert, and they faced challenges ranging from natural disasters to lost caravans. Travelers who ventured too far away from their caravans and got lost often died from the elements. If scouts died or strayed away from their groups, the caravans would get lost in the desert and wander. Even worse, natural disasters, such as sand storms or fluctuating temperatures, often forced merchants to abandon their goods to save their own lives, yet causing them to lose everything. In his memoir, Battuta described the Sahara as a "desert haunted by demons."

==== Mansa Musa ====
By the end of the 10th century, Islam had spread to many Northern and Western African empires. By the 14th century, empires such as Ghana and Mali, had strong ties with the Muslim world, and many of their most prominent leaders practiced the Muslim faith. Mali's most famous ruler, Mansa Musa, traveled across the Trans-Saharan trade routes on his pilgrimage to Mecca in 1325. Because Islam became so prominent in North and West Africa, many of the trade routes and caravan networks were controlled by Muslim nations. In the 14th century, prominent trade and travel routes had been firmly established.

=== Trade Goods ===
During the 14th century, and later the 15th century, the primary trading goods along the Trans-Saharan trade routes were gold, salt, precious metals, such as copper and iron, ivory, spices, materials, such as skins, cloth, and leather, and also slaves.

==== Trade Routes ====
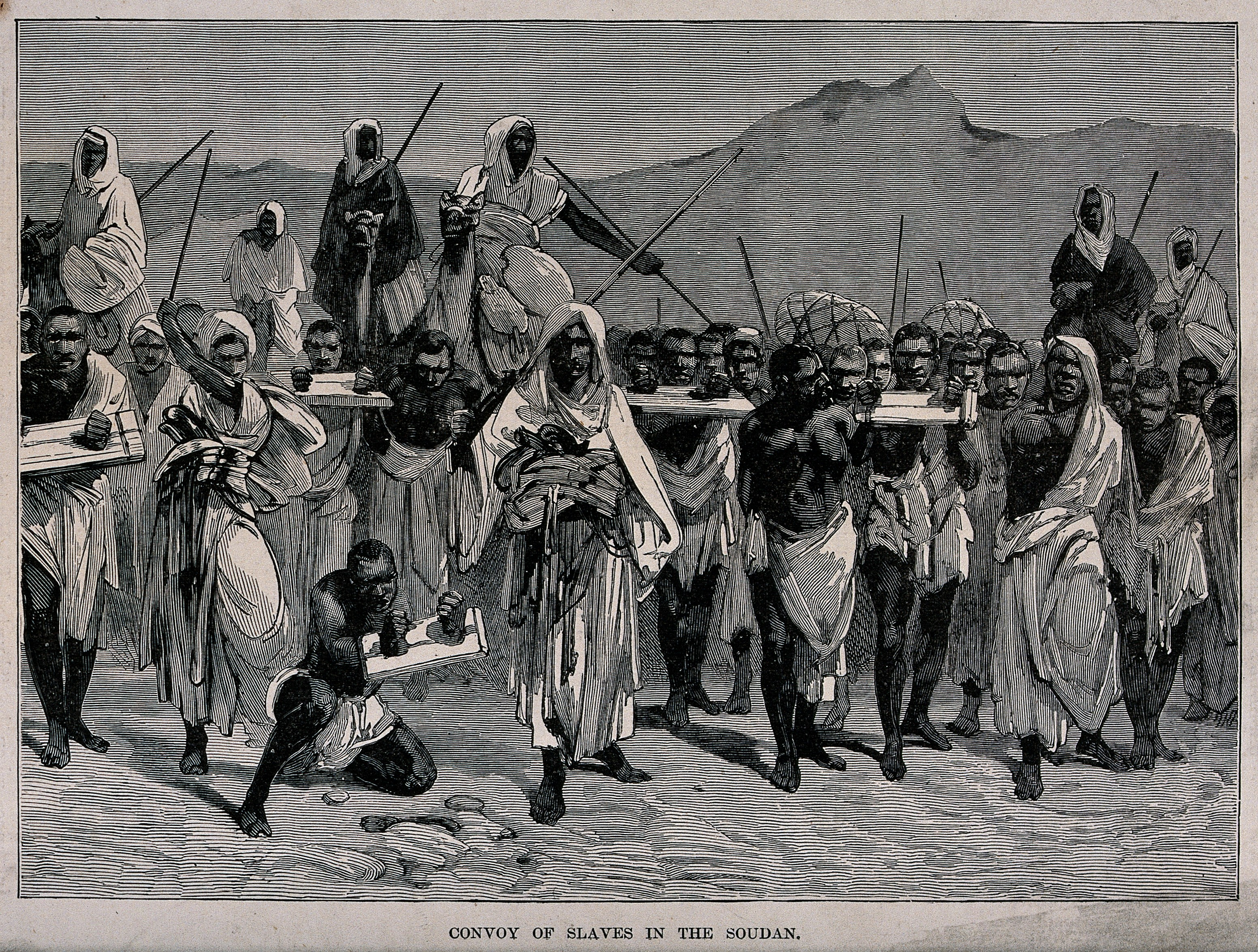
A 19th-century engraving depicting an Arab slave-trading caravan

Trade among the Sahara Desert was highly influenced by the prominent Western empires and the local people living along the trade routes. In the 10th-15th centuries the major empires of Ghana, Mali, and Songhay influenced many of the trade practices. These powerful empires would extend their hand of power over African trade by directing trade routes through the major cities and taxing the travelling merchants and their goods. Through the power of the empires, many of the trade routes were secured and the merchant profession became a prosperous one. When travelling, traders could travel individually or in groups, or they could attach themselves to an annual caravan.

Along the trade routes, local or residential tribes would establish and maintain resting posts for the traveling merchants. The scouts often used these trading posts to guide the caravans along the correct trade routes.

== The Spread of Islam ==
Since the origin of the religion, Islam has had an evident influence in the culture where its followers would inhabit. Since the religion affects major aspects of its follower's lifestyle, this convert-focused religion would influence family values, social conduct, and even judicial practices of the surrounding communities. As Muslims conquered more land, the practices of Islam would spread wherever they went. Islam primarily spread its influence to the Northern and Eastern coast of Africa.

=== Northern Africa ===
After the Nomadic Almohad peoples overthrew the Almoravids of Spain and North Africa, by the 13th century its government had collapsed from within and split into 3 different states, consisting of both Almoravid and Almohad groups. Then in 1415, the Spanish Reconquista forced most of the Muslims out of Spain and into North Africa. During this transition from the Almohad empire to the Muslim tri-state era, trade between Europe and North Africa increased the wealth of the primarily Muslim region, as well as their ability to maintain power in the Sahara. Their control of the gold trade routes led to the rise of the great Mali empire.

== The Mali Empire ==
The Mali Empire was one of the great empires of West Africa, reaching its peak in the 14th century. Mali was founded by the legendary Sundiata Keita in approximately 1230 after defeating the Sosso at the battle of Krina. Its capital was at Niani, in modern Guinea. After Sundiata's death in 1255, the kingship remained in the Keita family line until 1285. In 1285, after a series of weak kings, a freed slave named Sakura took the throne. Sakura was an effective ruler, but died while returning from his pilgrimage to Mecca.

=== 14th Century Mali ===
The Mali Empire's entrance into the 14th century was heralded by a return of the throne to the Keita family line with the reign of Mansa (king) Qu. Mansa Qu's successor was his son, Mansa Muhammad.

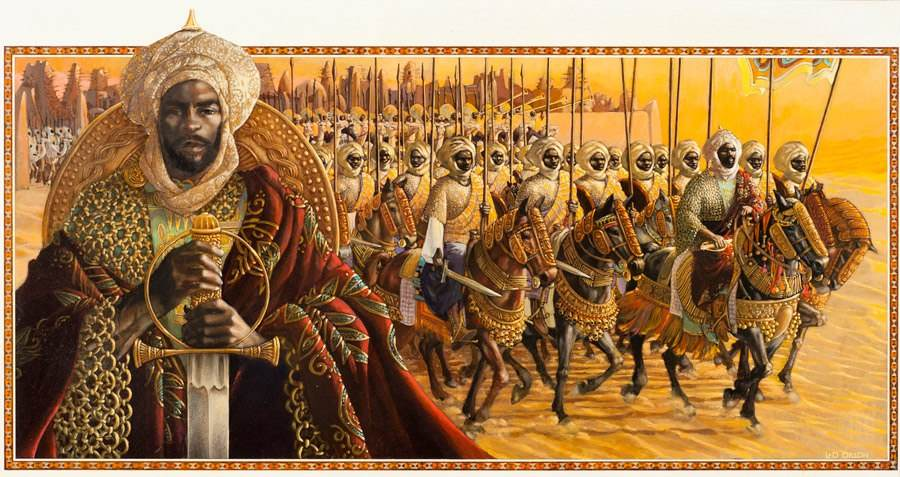
An artist's depiction of Mansa Musa

==== Mansa Musa ====
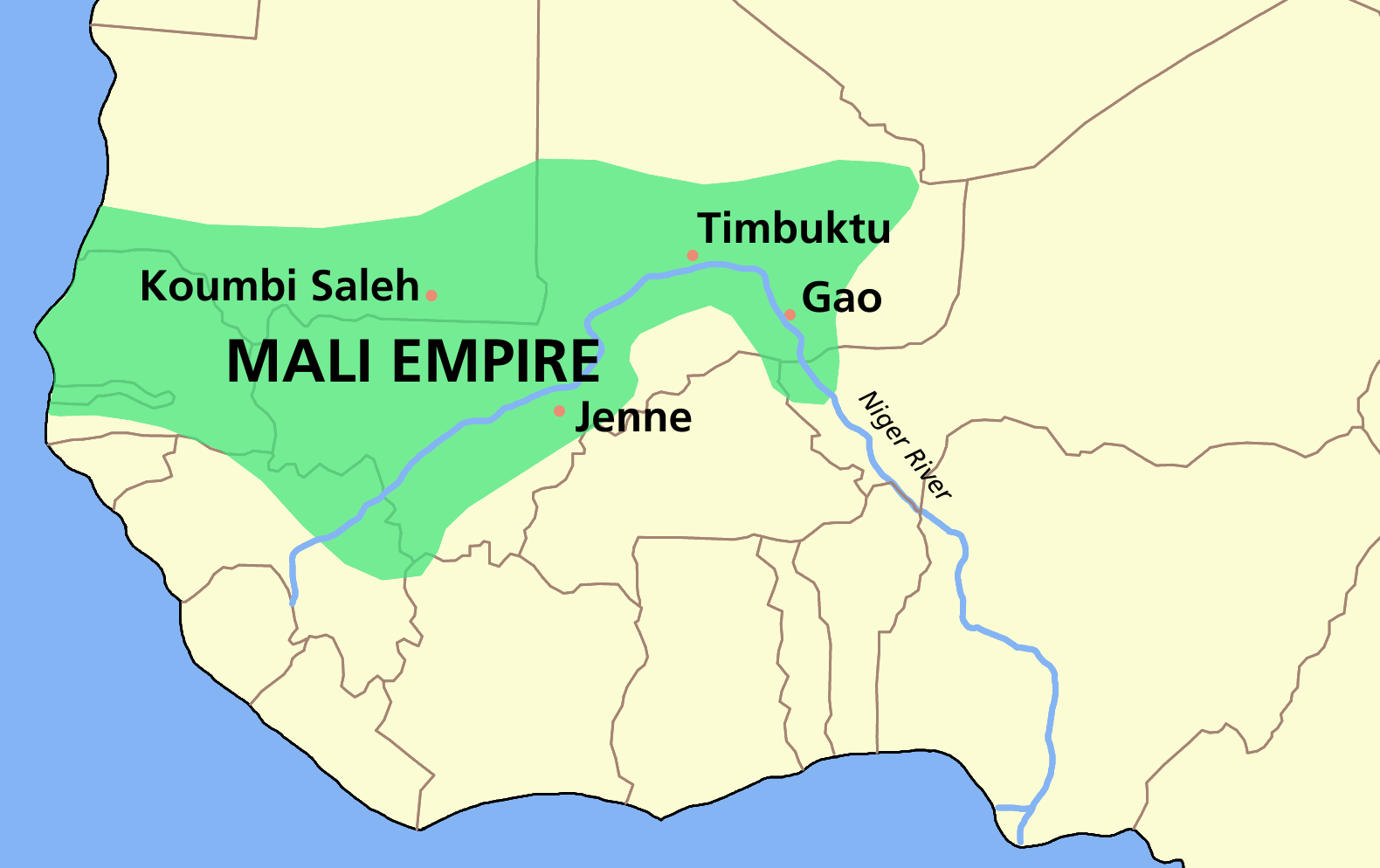
Map of Mali Empire under Mansa Musa

In 1312 the most famous Malian king, Mansa Musa, came to power. Mansa Musa's reign marks the golden age of the Mali empire, spreading its territory and fame far and wide. Under Mansa Musa, the empire reached as far as the Atlantic Ocean in the West and past the trading cities of Timbuktu and Gao in the East, encompassing the past kingdom of Ghana in its entirety, and was home to an estimated five to ten million people.

===== Pilgrimage to Mecca =====
Mansa Musa's global renown came as a result of his Hajj in 1324. He set out with a vast entourage across the Sahara desert toward Mecca. In Cairo, he initially refused to visit the sultan, as the tradition at the time was for the visitor to bow before him, and Musa believed himself to be of superior rank and power. Eventually, he made a compromise and bowed before Allah in the presence of the sultan. After the encounter, the sultan honoured Mansa Musa by inviting him to sit beside him as an equal, and they spoke for some time.

According to the Islamic writer Al-Umari, Mansa Musa brought with him no less than 100 camels laden with 300 pounds of gold each, as well as 60,000 people wearing silk, 12,000 servants, and 500 gold-staff bearing slaves before him.

"Let me add that gold in Egypt had enjoyed a high rate of exchange up to the moment of their [Mansa Musa's] arrival. The gold medal that year had not fallen below twenty-five drachmas. But from that day onward, its value dwindled; the exchange was ruined, and even now it has not recovered. The mitqal scarcely touches twenty-two drachmas. That is how it has been for twelve years from that time, because of the great amounts of gold they brought into Egypt and spent there." — Al Umari

===== Mansa Musa's Legacy =====
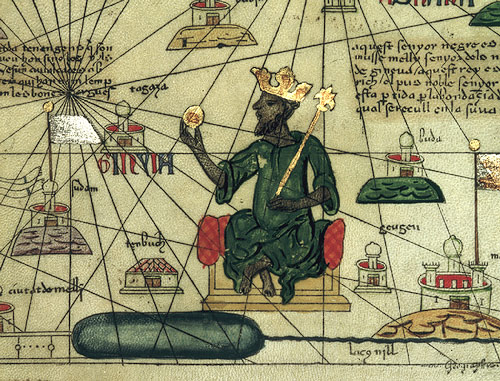
Depiction of Mansa Musa, ruler of the Mali Empire in the 14th century, from 1375 Catalan Atlas of the known world (Mappa Mundi), drawn by Abraham Cresques of Mallorca. Musa is shown holding a gold nugget and wearing a European-style crown.

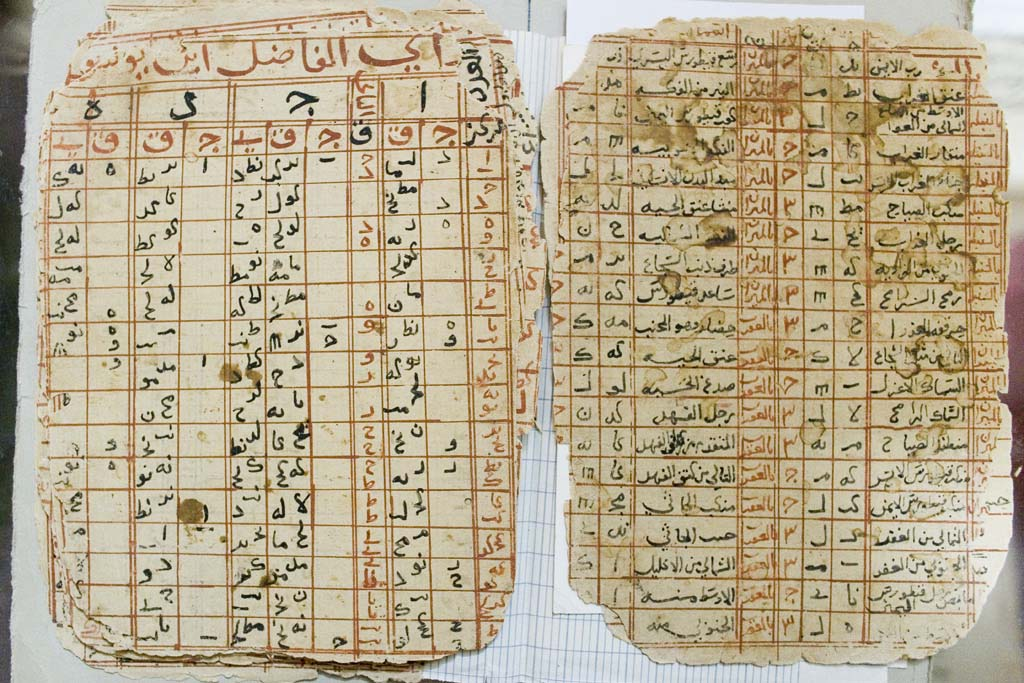
Ancient manuscript from Timbuktu

On his return journey back to Mali, Mansa Musa brought with him many scholars, artisans, architects, and other men of learning. They built many magnificent structures, including the mosque of Gao, and buildings in Timbuktu. He also established a diplomatic relationship with the sultan of Morocco, with the two kings mutually sending ambassadors to the other's court. Mansa Musa had a lifelong dedication to education and sent many young men to be educated at the university in Fez, Morocco who eventually returned and began Quranic schools and universities in many Malian cities, namely Timbuktu. The tale of the wealth of the Mansa of Mali spread far around the globe, making the Malian Empire one of the most famous African empires of its time—even being featured on ancient European maps. Mansa Musa has been claimed to have been the richest person to have ever lived, with an estimated net worth adjusted for inflation of $400 billion (as of 2012). Mansa Musa's reign ushered in a time of peace and prosperity in Mali that would last through the reign of his eventual successor, Mansa Suleyman.

==== Mansa Maghan ====
Mansa Maghan was the son of Mansa Musa, and was not a skilled leader. He ruled as Mansa of Mali beginning in 1337 but was in power for only four years before his uncle and Mansa Musa's brother, Suleyman Keita, became emperor in 1341. There was some question as to whether Suleyman had a hand in Maghan's deposition, and some internal conflict resulted from the change in leadership.

==== Mansa Suleyman Keita ====
Mansa Suleyman Keita succeeded Mansa Maghan, and was a proficient ruler, though his reign was not as peaceful as Mansa Musa's, and some land east of Timbuktu and Gao was lost to the Songhai people. Despite the growing unrest in the region, Mali still enjoyed a great level of political stability and security as noted by the famed Islamic explorer and writer Ibn Battuta, who visited Mali in 1352.

"The negroes possess some admirable qualities. They are seldom unjust and have a greater abhorrence of injustice than any other people. Their sultan [the Mansa] shows no mercy to anyone guilty o the least act of it. There is complete security in their country. Neither traveller nor inhabitant has anything to fear from robbers or men of violence." — Ibn Battuta

The death of Mansa Suleyman marked the beginning of the period of decline in the Mali Empire. The time leading into the 15th century was characterized by weak rulers, short reigns, and disputes over succession.

=== 15th Century Mali ===
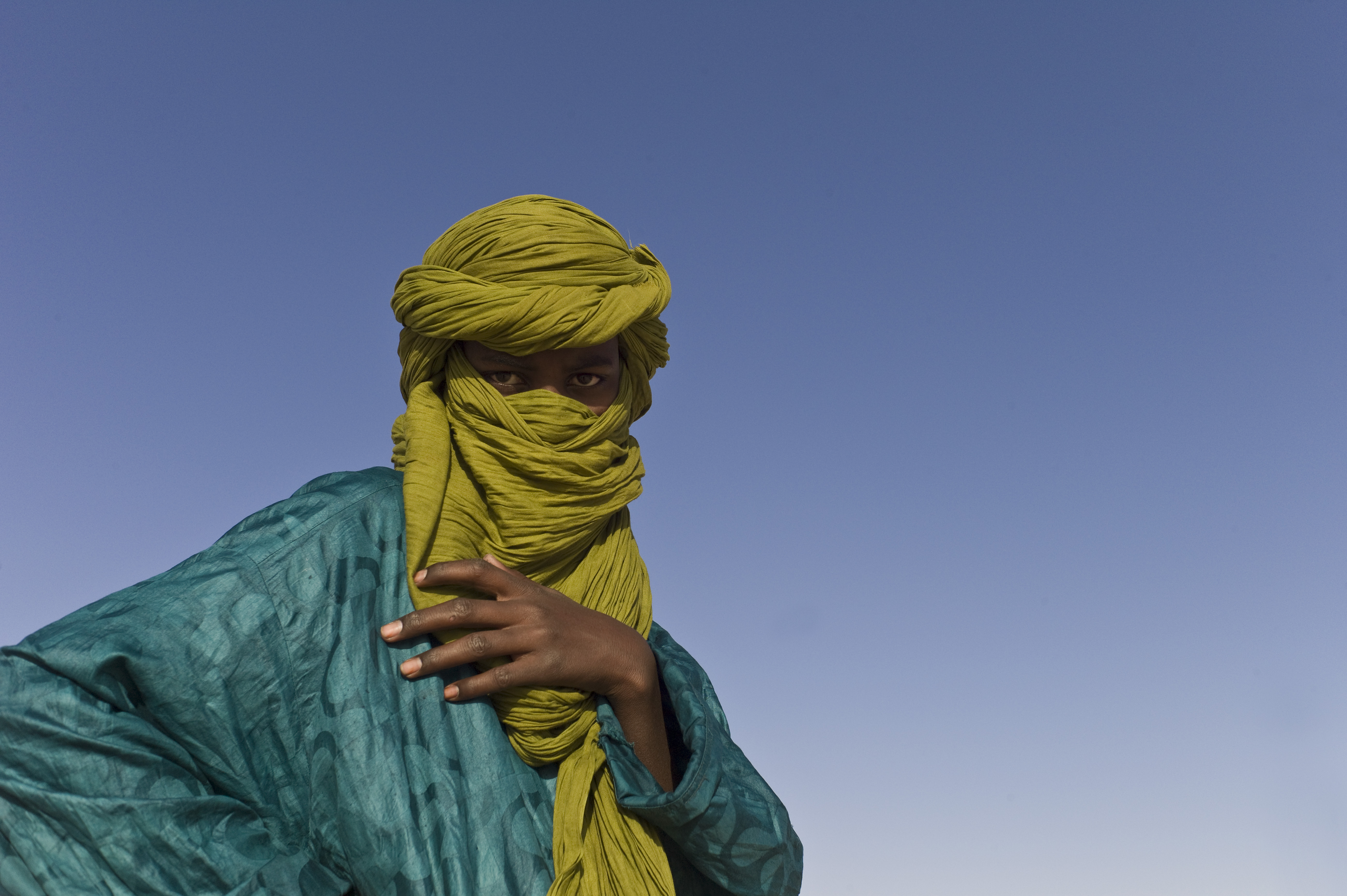
A Tuareg man near Timbuktu in Modern Mali

Though the Mali Empire was now in the hands of weak kings, it continued to exist well into the 15th century. Timbuktu was an important point of both trade and learning in Imperial Mali, so its loss to Tuareg Berbers in 1433 was a significant blow to the weakening state. In addition to Tuareg rebellion, the Mossi people revolted and began raiding towns deep within Mali. Eventually, the city of Gao in the East broke off from Mali, as did the Wolof cities along the coast in the West. Throughout the 15th century, Mali progressively shrunk in size as many of its territories abandoned the empire, though it continued existing as an independent entity well into the 16th century. However, in 1546, the Songhai kingdom sacked Mali's capital, Niani, formally ending Mali's rule as an independent empire.

== 14th and 15th Century Marinid Dynasty ==
=== Origins ===
Flag of Marinid empire

The Marinid dynasty was composed of Berber tribes of the race of the Zenetes (Zenatas), as opposed to the Hilalian Arabs, and were under the rule of the Almohads. But early in the 12th century, they turned against a weakening Almohad to build a dynasty that lasted nearly two centuries. With the defeat of the last of the Almohads and the capture of Marrakech in 1269, the Marīnids, under Abū Yūsuf Yaʿqūb, became masters of Morocco.

=== Holy War on the Iberian Peninsula and Northern Africa ===
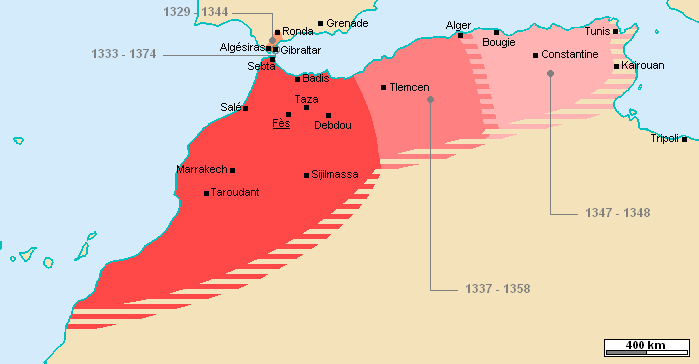
The Marinid empire at its greatest extent, around 1348.

During the 14th century the Marinids expanded their control in Northern Africa and fought Holy Wars with the Christians on the Iberian Peninsula. Marinids viewed jihad as the duty of Muslim sovereignty and to strengthened the dynasty. During the reign of Abu Sa'id Uthman II, the Marinids extended their authority over the Middle Maghrib. They also crossed into al-Andalus in response to a request from the governor of Granada. Abu Sa'id was succeeded by his son, Abu-l-Hasan 'Ali ibn 'Uthman, who seized Tilmisan in 1332. In 1333, Abd al-Malik, crossed the Straits of Gibraltar and defeated the Castilians who occupied the region since 1309. When Abd al-Malik died his father, Abu al-Hasan, led another invasion in 1340 onto the Iberian Peninsula but was defeated by a coalition of forces from Castile and Portugal at the Salado River. While the war helped unite the Muslim Naṣrid dynasty of Granada and slowed the advance of the Christians toward the Strait of Gibraltar, no land was taken from the Christians. This defeat significantly changed the balance of power in favour of Christians forcing the Marinids to retreat to Morocco and to abandon their objective of domination of the Iberian Peninsula.

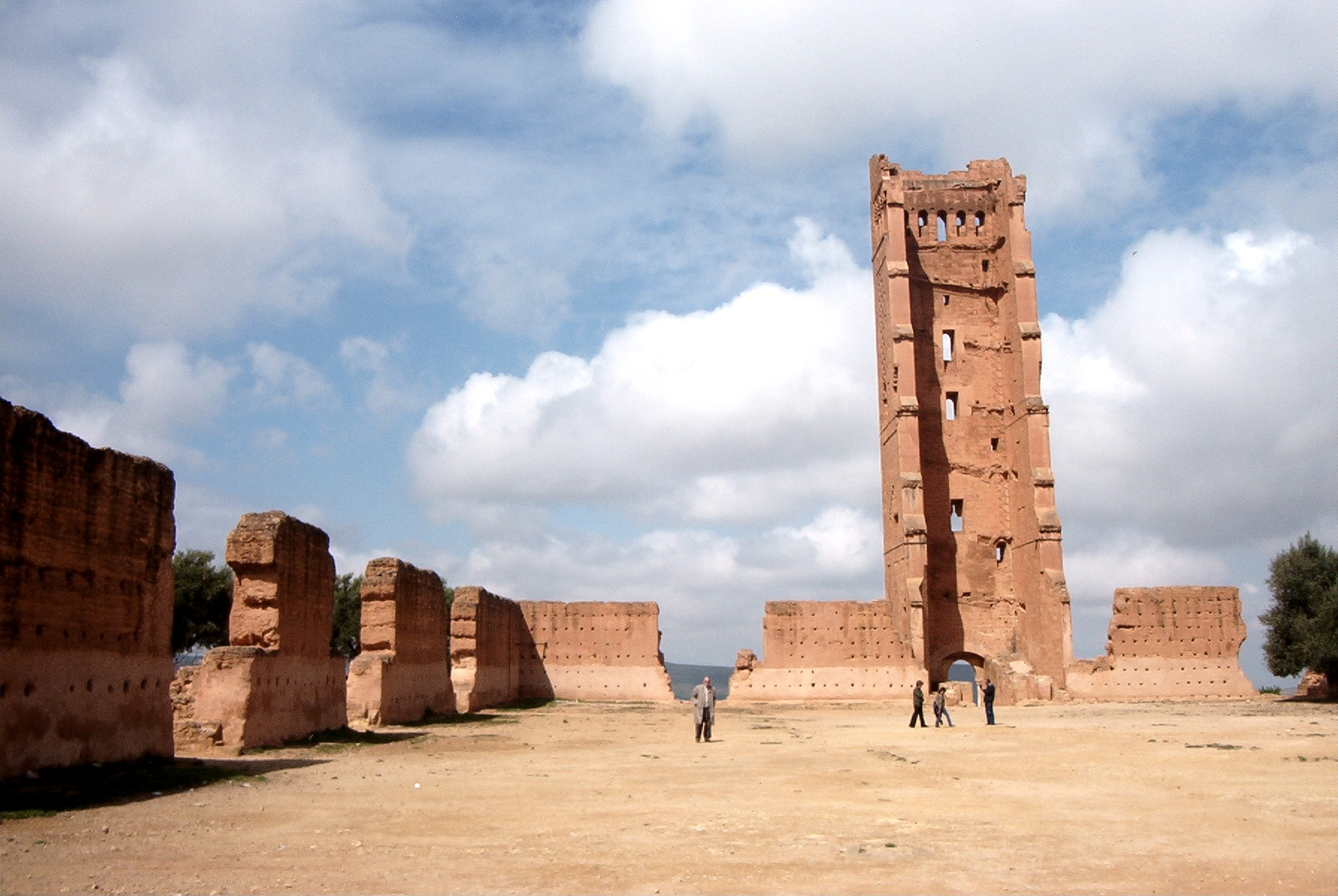
Remnants of the city of al-Mansoura constructed by the Marinids during their siege of Tlemcen.

In addition to invasions on the Iberian Peninsula, the Marinids wanted to control the central Maghreb and Ifriqiya. Their first attacks were against the Abdalwadids of Tlemcen, the Marinids immediate neighbours to the east, whom they invade several times. In 1337 Abū al-Ḥasan ʿAlī, one of the Marīnid sultans, tried to restore the Almonad empire. He captured the Tunisia capital of Tilimsān (Tlemcen) but was unable to defeat the Ḥafṣid. But in 1347, Abu-l-Hasan 'Ali ibn 'Uthman also captured Tunis and the Hafsid amir. He later also captured Barqa and Tarablus. During this time the Marinids united all of the Maghrib under one government. This expansion was temporary because the following year, Abu-l-Hasan 'Ali ibn 'Uthman's army was defeated in Kairouan by a coalition of Arab tribes. Eventually, the Near Maghrib and the Middle Maghrib seceded from the Marinid state when weak rulers rose to power causing it to return to its original borders. These military campaigns depleted the resources of the Marinid dynasty and led to a state of anarchy.

=== Decline of the Marinids ===
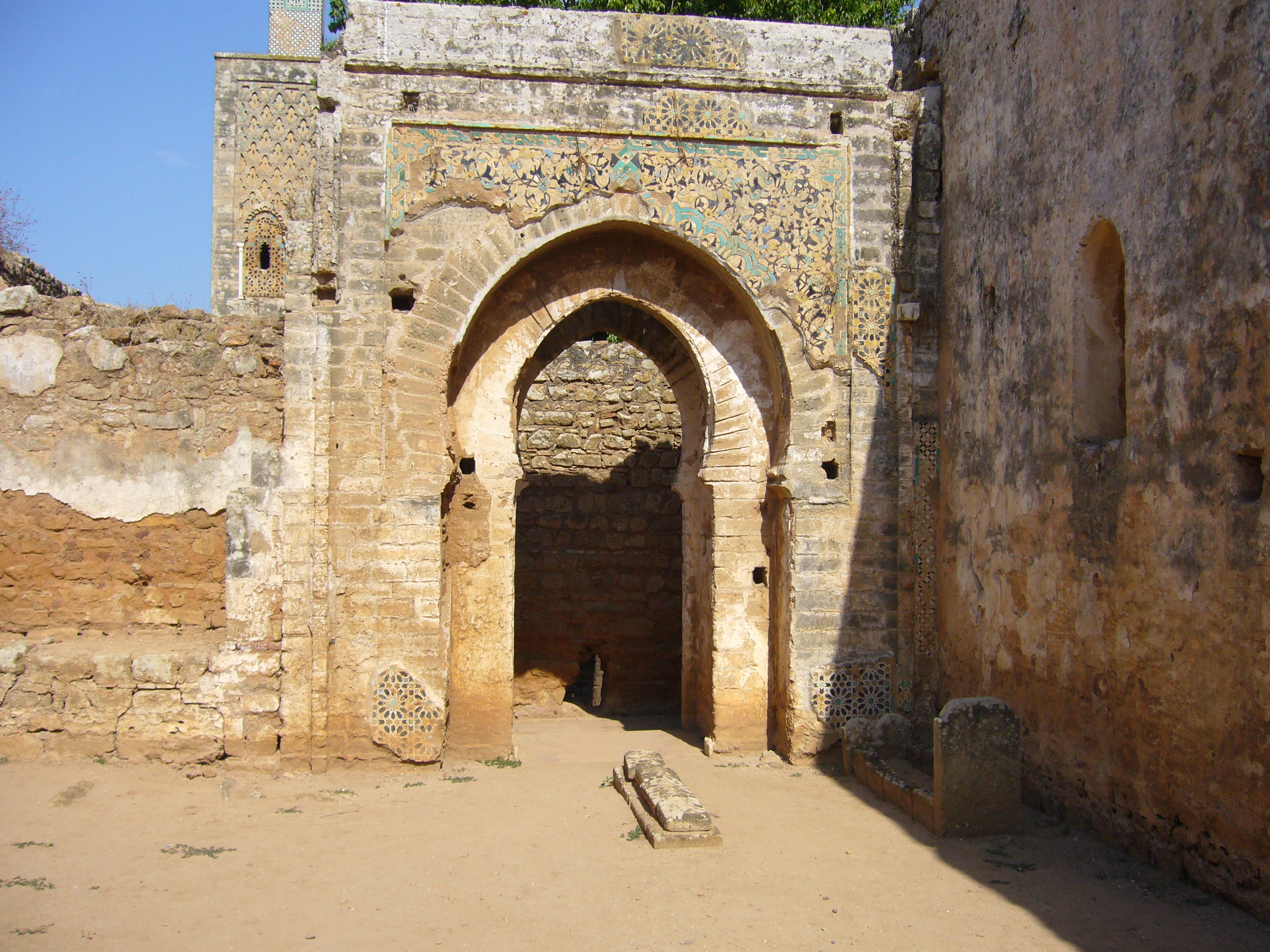
Marinid Tombs at the Necropolis of Chellah

The defeat in Kairouan diminished the power of the Marinids, who slipped into a period of decline. In the West Maghreb, the Marinids are not able to control the entire population. The Arab tribes grow more restless, the tax receipts decline and the sultans lose their power in favour of the Arab viziers, who are representatives of a real caste of high officials which take control of the kingdom and declare themselves as sultans themselves. The leaders are subjected to a close guardianship during this period of upheaval and the smallest amount of diffidence would lead to the overthrow or the assassination of the sultan. Both Abu Salim (1359-1361), and Abu Ziyan (1361-1366) were assassinated during this period of anarchy. The state of anarchy which existed during the late 14th century a led to a breakdown of unity in the empire and several contenders opposed the vizier which divided the country. Although the dynasty is in a state of decline during this time it was strong enough in 1389 to defuse the Abdalwadides and control the foreign relations of the sultans of Tlemcen.

The final blow to the Marinids came from the Spanish Christians who invaded Berber in 1401 and destroy the city of Tetouan. A few years later in 1415, the Portuguese took over the city of Ceuta. The Marinids, who could not repel these invasions, saw their control over the population greatly diminish. The dynasty was unable to resist the unrest and revolutions of palaces, which are getting worse. In 1420, the Sultan Abu Said was assassinated. His successors survived under the guidance of the Wattasides, the Berber dynasty that reigned after the fall of Marinids. In 1465, with the assassination of Sultan Abd al-Haqq, the Marinids disappeared permanently as a ruling force. The Wattasides dynasty collapsed in 1548 when the Saʿdī sharifs took Fès.

=== 14th and 15th Century Marinid Sultans of Fez and Morocco ===
- Abu Yaqub Yusuf (1286–1306)
- Abu Thabit Amir (1307–1308)
- Abu al-Rabi Sulayman (1308–1310)
- Abu Said Uthman II (1310–1331)
- Abu al-Hasan 'Ali (1331–1348)
- Abu Inan Faris (1348–1358)
- Muhammad II as Said (1359)
- Abu Salim Ali II (1359–1361)
- Abu Umar Tashfin (1361)
- Abu Zayyan Muhammad III (1362–1366)
- Abu l-Fariz Abdul Aziz I (1366–1372)
- Muhammad as-Saîd (1372–1374)
- Abu l-Abbas Ahmad (1374–1384)
- Abu Zayyan Muhammad IV (1384–1386)
- Muhammad V (1386–1387)
- Abu l-Abbas Ahmad (1387–1393)
- Abdul Aziz II (1393–1398)
- Abdullah (1398–1399)
- Abu Said Uthman III (1399–1420)
- Abd al-Haqq II (1420–1465)

== 14th and 15th Century Solomonic Dynasty ==
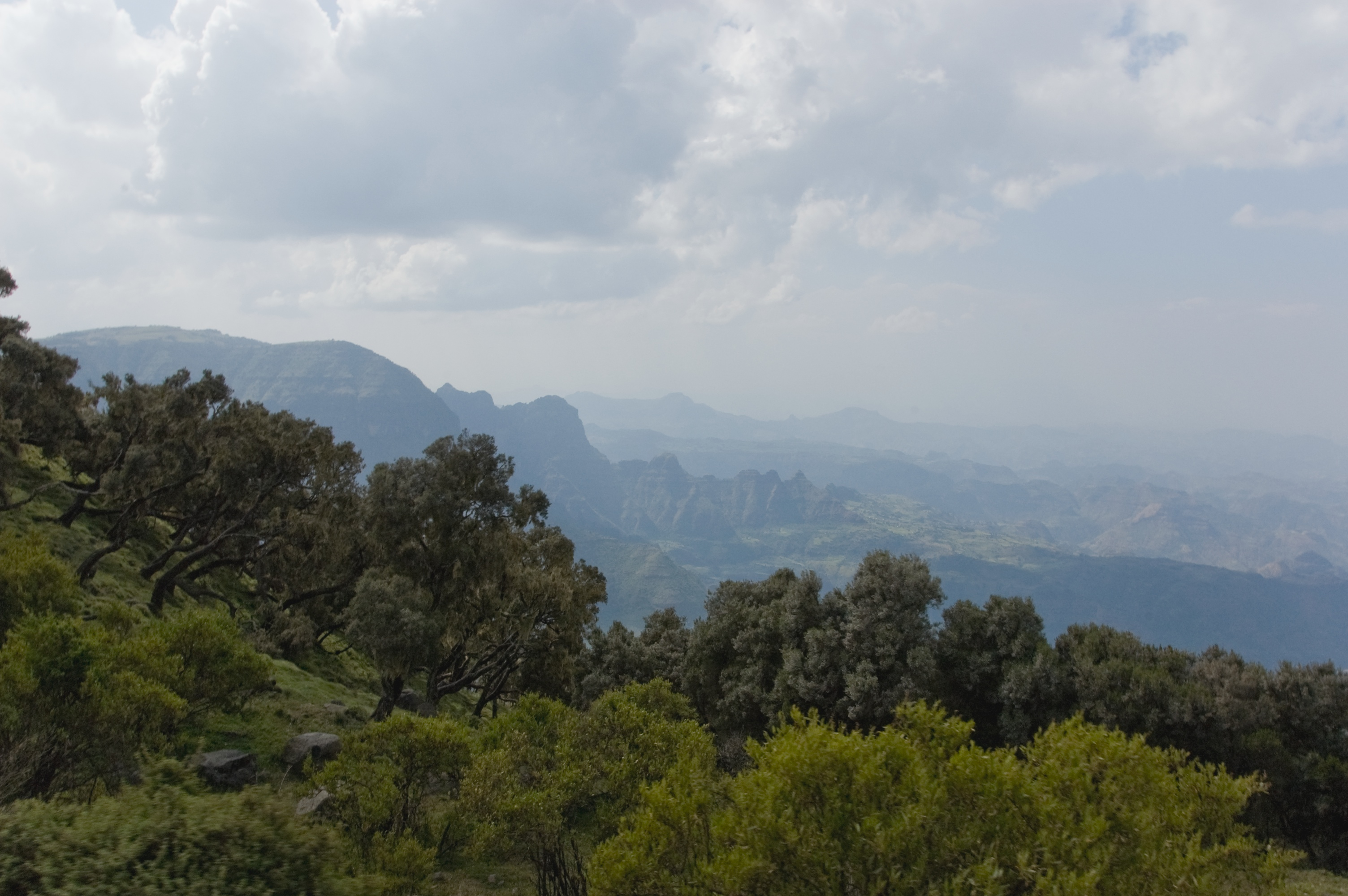
Mountains in the Ethiopian highlands.

The Christian Solomonic Dynasty ruled in the highlands of modern-day Ethiopia and Eritrea. To the east and south were the Muslim kingdoms of Ifat and Adal.

By the 14th century Solomonic Kings had been ruling for thirty years, having taken over from the previous Zagwe Dynasty in 1270. The Solomonic Kings claimed their heritage to the union of the Biblical King Solomon and the Queen of Sheba, and to the Axumite kings. The primary literature documenting this newly restored line is the Kebra Nagast. This heritage linked the crown and the church, which both saw growth during this period. The Solomonic Empire was an outpost of Christianity, neighbored by Muslim nations which it frequently fought with. Solomonic kings of this era did not maintain a capital, but rather moved the court from place to place. The primary ruling of day-to-day life was determined by local leaders.

=== 14th and 15th Century Emperors of the Solomonic Dynasty ===
- Wed Arad (1299-1314)
- Amda Seyon I (1314-1344)
- Neway Kristos (1344-1372)
- Neway Maryam (1372-1382)
- Dawit I (1382-1413)
- Tewodros I (1413-1414)
- Yeshaq I (1414-1429)
- Andreas (1429-1430)
- Takla Maryam (1430-1433)
- Saree Iyasus (1433-1433)
- Amda Iyasus (1433-1434)
- Zara Yacob (1434-1468)
- Baeda Maryam I (1468-1478)
- Eskender (1478-1494)
- Amda Sayon II (1494-1494)
- Na'od (1494-1508)

==== Amda Seyon ====
Amda Seyon was emperor from 1314 to 1344, and his reign began with a tension between church and crown after he seduced his father's concubine and two sisters. This action causes a monk, Honorius, to openly rebuke him. In retaliation to the rebuke, Amda punished and banished many of the local monks. Throughout his reign Amda conducted many wars against Ethiopia's Muslim neighbours, primarily the kingdoms of Ifat and Adal. His conquests put pressure on Egypt to send a new abun, which for many years had been denied to the Ethiopian Church. His conquests also brought in many new territories, which rebelled on many different occasions.

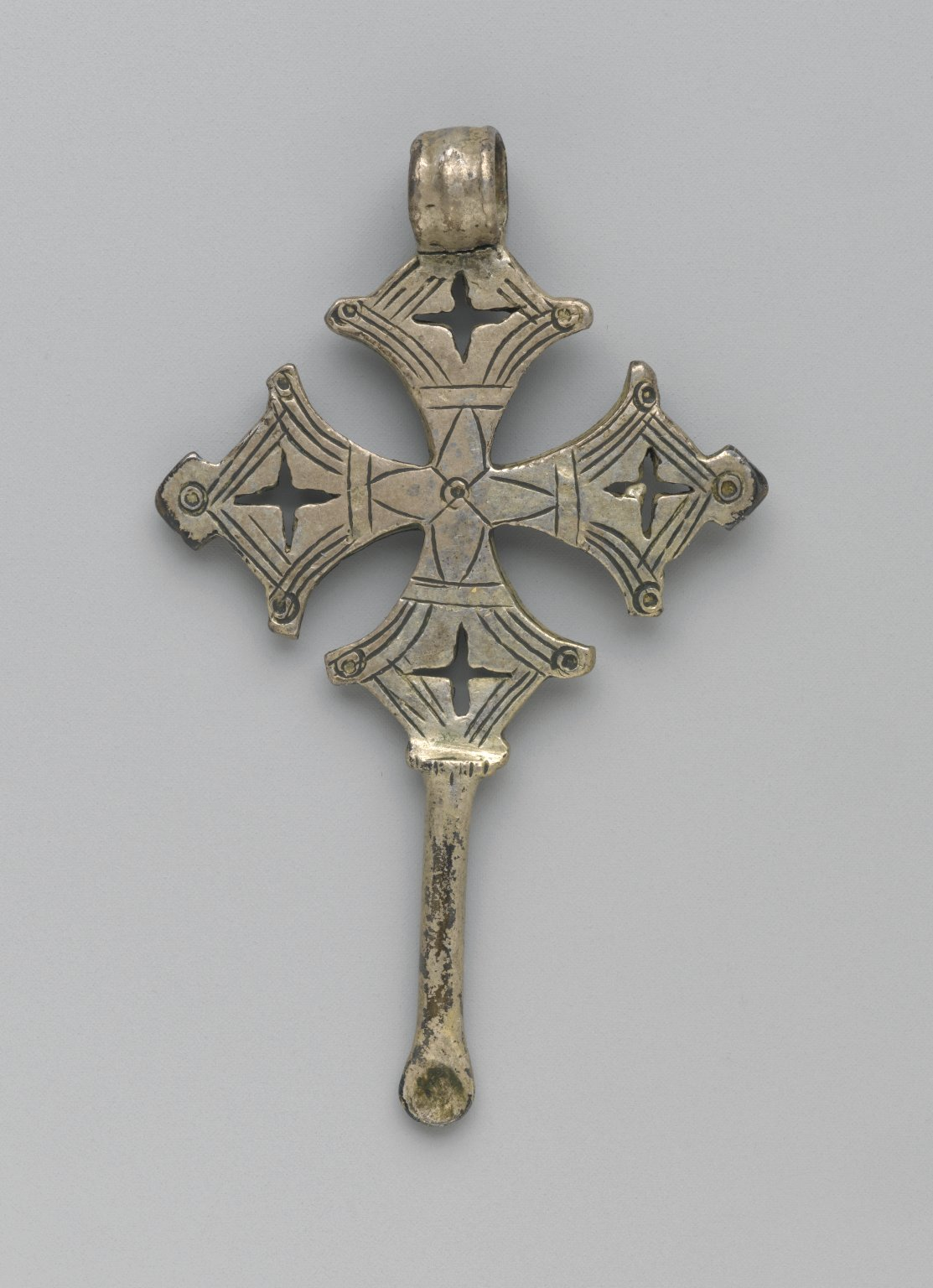
An Ethiopian cross typical of the Ethiopian Orthodox Church.

==== Zara Yacob ====
Zara Yacob, who reigned from 1434 to 1468, was a reformer of the Church, an organizer of the government, and a warrior. Before his ascension to the throne, he was educated at an Eritrean monastery. During his reign, he did much to propagate the Church throughout his territories, including bringing in two co-buns and placing laws about the religious matter, with strict consequences. His coronation was held in Axum, reminiscent of the Axumite kings and his heritage. Zara Yacob intended to unite his kingdom with Christianity, as the main line of defence against its Muslim and pagan neighbours. During his reign he sent a delegation to Europe to reunite the Ethiopian Church with its Roman counterpart, as well as to develop diplomatic connections. During his reign a number of religious text were written and translated, including the Berhan. Zara Yacob also reorganized the government, reallocating land and fixing the tribute. During this time there was continued warring with the Muslim kingdoms.

=== Christianity in Solomonid Ethiopia ===
Solomonid rule was based on a biblical heritage and as such the kings and the country maintained Christianity as the state religion. The branch of Christianity that was followed during the 14th and 15th century was primarily Coptic Christianity, with the abuna's, or bishops, coming from Egypt. In the 14th century there was a break-off from the traditional Coptic Church in the form of Sabbatarians, who believed that they had purified their Christianity. These people would later be known as the Beta Israel, following a distinct pre-Talmudic faith.
