= Zayyanid–Almohad wars =

Series of conflicts between the Zayyanid Kingdom and Almohad Caliphate (1236–1248)

Date	1236–1248
Location	Algeria and eastern Morocco
Result	Zayyanid victory

Belligerents
Zayyanid Kingdom	Almohad Caliphate
	Marinid Sultanate; Hafsid dynasty

Commanders and leaders
Yaghmurasen ibn Zyan and his son Abu Said Uthman I	Abu al-Hasan as-Said al-Mutadid †; Abu Yahya ibn Abd al-Haqq (1244-1248); Abu Zakariya Yahya (Hafsid dynasty)

The Zayyanid-Almohad wars (1236–1248), also known as the Tlemcen-Almohad wars, were a series of conflicts that occurred between the Zayyanid dynasty, rulers of the Kingdom of Tlemcen in present-day Algeria, and the Almohad Caliphate, a North African Berber-Muslim empire that existed from the 12th to the 13th centuries. These wars took place during the Almohad period and were primarily fought over territorial control and influence in the Maghreb region of North Africa.

Around 1230 the Almohad empire was beginning to decline, and the leaders appointed the Zayyanid chief Jabir ibn Yusuf as governor of Tlemcen who took control of the city for the Almohad empire. Yaghmurasen ibn Zyan was the next governor of Tlemcen who was appointed in 1235, after a short time the Almohad caliphate lost control over the city and Yaghmurasen declared independence for Tlemcen effectively making him the first ruler and founder. The war started when Yaghmurasen tried to consolidate power and gain control of the surrounding territories including territories owned by the Almohad caliphate.

In 1241, the Zayyanid territories survived an invasion by the Hafsid dynasty, in 1248 the successors of the Almohad leaders attempted to invade Tlemcen and their lands located in Western Algeria but failed. In 1248, Abu Yahya ibn Abd al-Haqq, who was the sultan of the Marinid dynasty, attacked Tlecemen. Abu al-Hasan as-Said al-Mutadid attacked Tlecemen and laid siege to the Oudja fortress where Yaghmurasen was, the Battle of Oujda which was one of the decisive victories of the Zayyanid dynasty which ended the Zayyanid-Almohad wars.

== See also ==
- Kingdom of Tlemcen
- Hafsid dynasty
- Almohad Caliphate
