= Hafsid raid on Azeffoun =

Hafsid Raid on Azeffoun
Date	1314
Location	Azeffoun
Result	Hafsid Victory
Territorial changes	Destruction of the Azeffoun fortress

Belligerents
Hafsids of Béjaïa	Kingdom of Tlemcen

Commanders and leaders
Abu Yahya Abu Bakr	Abu Sa'id Uthman I, Abd al-Wadid

Strength
Unknown	Unknown

Casualties and losses
Unknown	Unknown

The Hafsid raid on Azzefoun took place in 1314, pitting the Hafsid forces against the forces of the Kingdom of Tlemcen. The raid resulted in the destruction of Azzefoun.

== Background ==
Yaghmurasen ibn Zyanadvised his successor, Abū Saʿīd ʿUthmān, on his deathbed to abandon the struggle against the Marinids and instead direct Tlemcen’s expansion eastward. As Marinid influence declined and Hafsid authority weakened, the Zayyanids increasingly turned their attention toward Ifriqiya. Their incursions led to the establishment of several fortified positions along the frontier, including Azeffoun in coastal Kabylia.

== Raid ==
In 714 AH (1314 CE), the Hafsids launched a counteroffensive against the Banu Abd al-Wad. Supported by their navy, they destroyed the fortress of Azlafun, which the Banu Abd al-Wad had recently established on the coast of Kabylia as a strategically important forward outpost.

== Aftermath ==
The destruction of Azzefoun by the Hafsids was followed by a series of major military campaigns in 721, 722, 724, 725 and 726 AH. These expeditions were led by Zayyanid commanders, including the army commander Mūsā ibn ʿAlī al-Ghazzī, who sought to strengthen Zayyanid control over the region, encircle their opponents around Constantine, and capture Béjaïa. The campaigns also led to the construction of the fortresses of Bakr and Tamaz Yazdakt.

== Sources ==
- Valérian, Dominique (2013). port maghrébin, 1067-1510 (in French).
- Brunchvig, Robert (1988). La Berbérie orientale sous les Hafsides (des origines à la fin du XVe siècle) (in Arabic).
- Boutaba, Mahfoud (2021). المنشآت المعمارية لسلاطين بني زيان بالمغرب الأوسط السلطان أبو حمو وابنه أبو تاشفين نموذج (in Arabic).
