= Siege of Tlemcen (1299–1307) =

Date	1299–1307
Location	Tlemcen modern day Algeria 34°53′00″N 1°19′00″W
Result	Zayyanid victory: Marinid retreat

Belligerents
Marinid Sultanate	Kingdom of Tlemcen

Commanders and leaders
Abu Yaqub Yusuf an-Nasr †	Abu Said Uthman I †; Abu Zayyan I

Strength
Unknown	Unknown

Casualties and losses
Unknown	Unknown
- Location within Algeria Siege of Tlemcen (1299–1307) (Mediterranean)

The siege of Tlemcen from 1299 to 1307 designates all of the operations undertaken by the army of the Marinid sultan, Abu Yaqub Yusuf an-Nasr to seize the city of Tlemcen, the capital of the Zayyanid Kingdom, during the conflict between the Kingdom of Tlemcen and the Marinids. The siege was lifted following the assassination of the Marinid Sultan.

== Siege ==
The abandonment of his territories in Spain gave Marinid sultan Abu Yaqub a free hand to pursue a war against the Abdalwadids of Tlemcen in 1295. Marinid forces moved systematically and slowly along the coast, taking Taourirt (1295), Oujda (1296), Taount and Nedroma (1298) before finally arriving at Tlemcen in May 1299. Settling down for a long siege, Abu Yaqub erected a siege camp which turned into a veritable city, known as al-Mahalla al-Mansura ('Camp of Victory'), with markets, public baths, palaces and mosques of its own. From here, he conducted the siege against Tlemcen, while dispatching detachments to seize the remaining coastal possessions of the Abdalwadid sultanate, all the way to Algiers.

Nonetheless, the besieged city of Tlemcen refused to fall. The death of the Abdalwadid sultan Othman in 1303 prompted the city to contemplate capitulation, but his successor Abu Zayyan I rallied the resistance and ensured it continued to hold out.

With an eye to relieving the siege, Abdalwadid agents persuaded the new Nasrid sultan Muhammad III of Granadato transport a Marinid pretender, a certain Uthman ibn Abi al-Ula, to Ceuta in 1306. Uthman landed with Granadan help and immediately proclaimed himself ruler of Morocco. But the Marinid emir Abu Yaqub, sensing his siege was finally having an effect, and Tlemcen was on the verge of falling, decided to ignore the threat in his rear and press on with the siege. Unchallenged, Uthman's partisans added the neighboring towns of Asilah, Larache and much of the Ghomara region to his cause.

In May 1307, the Marinid sultan Abu Yaqub Yusuf was assassinated in the Tlemcen siege camp by a eunuch over an obscure harem affair. He was succeeded by his son, Abu Thabit Amir as Marinid sultan of Morocco, who opted to abandon the siege of Tlemcen and to confront Uthman in Ceuta. Abu Yaqub's twelve years of war against Tlemcen had ended with nothing to show for his efforts.
