= Siege of Almería (1309) =

Unsuccessful attempt by Aragon to capture Almeria

- Part of the Reconquista
Date	August–December 1309
Location	Madīnat al-Mariyya, Emirate of Granada (present-day Almería, Spain) 36°50′28″N 2°28′18″W
Result	Granadan victory

Belligerents
Aragon	Emirate of Granada; Zayyanid dynasty

Commanders and leaders
James II of Aragon	Abu Maydan Shua’yb, city governor; Abu al-Hasan al-Randahi, city's naval commander; Uthman ibn Abi al-Ula, relief force

Strength
12,000	Unknown

The siege of Almería was an unsuccessful attempt by Aragon to capture the city of Almería from the Emirate of Granada in 1309. Almería, a Mediterranean port in the southeast of the emirate, was the initial Aragonese target in a joint Aragonese-Castilian campaign aimed at conquering Granada. The Aragonese troops led by their King James II arrived on 11 August, blockading the city and employing siege engines. The city, led by governor Abu Maydan Shuayb and naval commander Abu al-Hasan al-Randahi, prepared for the siege by strengthening its defenses and stockpiling food. Throughout the siege, both sides exchanged shots from siege engines and engaged in fields battles and skirmishes with varying results. James ordered multiple unsuccessful assaults. A Granadan relief column under Uthman ibn Abi al-Ula arrived nearby in September and harassed the besiegers.

The approach of winter and a shortage of supplies in the besiegers' camp led James II to agree to a truce at the end of December. The siege was lifted and the Aragonese began withdrawing from Granadan territories. As James II did not have sufficient ships to transport his troops at once, some men were left behind. Some of them pillaged Granadan territories and some were ambushed while trying to travel home without authorization, resulting in their temporary capture. The siege was viewed as a decisive victory for Granada and ended Aragonese military involvement in the emirate for the rest of James II's reign. Sultan Nasr of Granada made peace with Aragon and Castile in 1310.

== Background ==
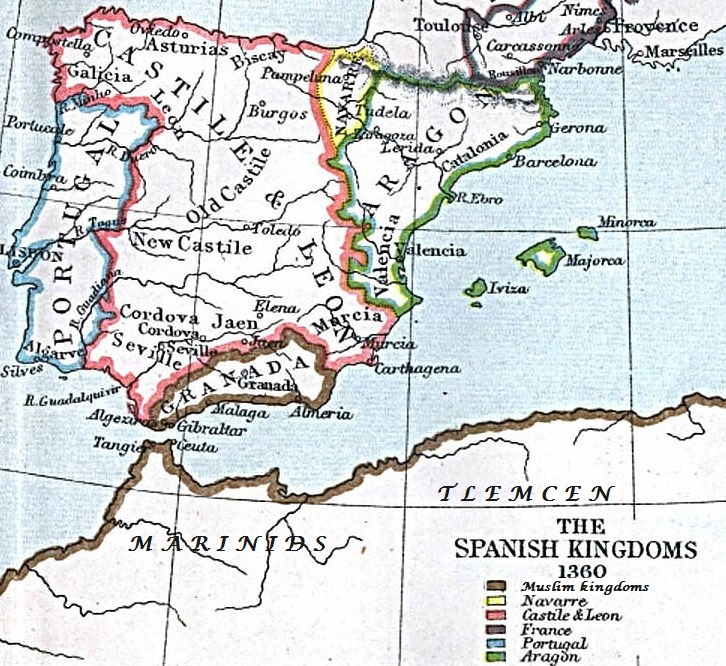
Iberian Peninsula and Western North Africa in 1360 (about 50 years after the siege). Borders might have slightly changed but the basic location of Castile, Aragon, Granada and the Marinids remained the same.

Since the mid-thirteenth century, the Emirate of Granada was the last remaining Muslim state on the Iberian Peninsula. Through a combination of diplomatic and military manoeuvres, it succeeded in maintaining its independence despite being surrounded by two larger neighbours, the Crown of Castile to the north and the Muslim Marinid state based in Morocco. From its founding in the 1230s, Granada intermittently entered into alliance or went to war with either of these powers, or encouraged them to fight one another in order to avoid being dominated by either. At the death of Muhammad II (r. 1273–1302) and the accession of Muhammad III (r. 1302–1309), Granada was allied with a nearby Christian kingdom, Aragon, and at war with Castile. Muhammad III eventually made peace with Castile in the 1303 treaty of Córdoba and became a vassal of Ferdinand IV of Castile (r. 1295–1312). Aragon made peace with Castile in the 1304 Treaty of Torellas, which also included peace with Granada as Castile's vassal. Having secured peace with the two largest powers on the Iberian Peninsula, the Emirate of Granada turned its attention to North Africa. Taking advantage of the war between the Marinids and the Kingdom of Tlemcen, Muhammad III instigated a rebellion in Ceuta—a port town just across the Strait of Gibraltar—against the Marinids in 1304, and in 1306 he sent a fleet to capture the town from the rebels.

With Ceuta in its possession, Granada controlled both sides of the strait—it held the ports of Gibraltar and Algeciras on the European side of the strait, as well as Málaga and Almería further east. This development alienated Aragon, Castile, and the Marinids, who all began to make plans against Granada. Castile and Aragon signed the Treaty of Alcalá de Henares on 19 December 1308, pledging to help each other to achieve a total conquest of Granada and split its territories between them. Aragon was promised a sixth of Granadan territories, including the port town of Almería, and the rest would go to Castile. In addition, both Christian powers also made an alliance with Abu al-Rabi Sulayman, who became the Sultan of the Marinids in July 1308 and wanted to recover Ceuta. The result was a tripartite alliance of Castile, Aragon and the Marinids against Granada, which was now isolated and surrounded by three larger enemies. As preparation for war was underway, the people and notables of Granada, angered by the diplomatic isolation, stormed the palaces of Muhammad III and his vizier Ibn al-Hakim al-Rundi, and dethroned the sultan in favour of his younger half-brother Nasr on 14 March 1309.

== Preparation ==
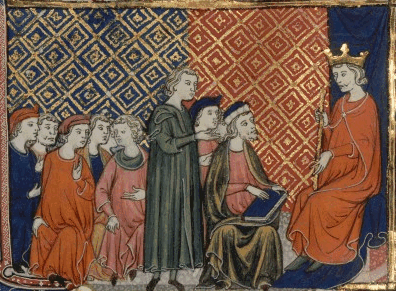
James II of Aragon (right) in a miniature of the early 14th century

Aragon's naval preparation was noticed by Granada and at the end of February 1309, and Muhammad III queried James II of Aragon (r. 1291–1327) about the target of the operation. James II responded on 17 March, assuring Granada that it was for his conquest of Sardinia. As tensions rose and Castile's vassals began attacking Granada's borders, the governor of Almería, Abu Maydan Shuayb, arrested Catalan merchants based in his city and confiscating their goods, while the Granadan fleet prepared for war. James II and his ally Ferdinand IV asked Pope Clement V—without mentioning their collaboration with the Marinids—to grant a crusading bull and financial support from the church. The pope granted James II two thirds of the decima—a tenth of church revenues, which can be collected by the monarch if authorized by the pope—for the upcoming crusade against Granada, and declared indulgences for those participating in the war.

To wage war against Granada, James II raised an army with the planned total of 12,000 including 1,000 knights and 2,000 archers. He also raised funds and strengthened the defenses of the Kingdom of Valencia, his realm closest to Granada. His target was Almería, in the southeastern coast of the Emirate of Granada and about 90 miles (140 km) from the capital. James brought along a relic of Indaletius, a saint from the ancient Urci on whose ruins Almería was believed to stand. Aragon did not have an immediate border with the Emirate, so a part of the force was transported by sea and others had to march overland through Castilian territories and then from the Castile–Granada frontiers to Almería via hostile territories.

The city of Almería prepared against a siege by stockpiling food, implementing a ration and strengthening the city's defenses. A Muslim account emphasized the importance of the food supplies, saying that "one of the signs of Allah's protection of the city's inhabitants was that great quantities of barley were in the storehouses at the beginning of the siege". The city's governor, Abu Maydan Shuayb and the naval commander Abu al-Hasan al-Randahi organized the improvement of the city's defense. They strengthened the walls, closed various gaps and demolished outer buildings that might be used by the attackers.

== Siege ==
The Emirate of Granada, including Almería on the southeastern coast

James II and his forces sailed from Valencia on 18 July 1309 and landed on the coast of Almería on 11 August. A Muslim account emphasized the forces' rich and colorful clothing, and the military instruments played by their musicians. His forces included siege engines such as mangonels and trebuchets. Such a display initially demoralized the defenders, but as time went by and various incidents took place, they became more optimistic.

The besiegers spread their troops to blockade the city by land and sea, and established palisades and ditches. The defenders manned the walls with archers and infantrymen, and barred all the gates with stonework except for some which were to be used for sorties. The late summer arrival was a major disadvantage for the invaders. It meant that there was a short time before the weather got cooler, and if the siege lasted until winter it would be an advantage for the defenders who did not have to be out in the field.

Apart from Almería in the east, the Emirate of Granada had to defend itself from multiple fronts. In North Africa, the Marinids attacked Ceuta in 12 May 1308 and took it on 21 July, while in Granada's western flank, Castile besieged Algeciras (31 July 1309 – January 1310) as well as Gibraltar (August – September 1309). Nevertheless, Nasr sent a relief forces to Almería, which were defeated by the Aragonese in an open battle on 23 August. A Christian account mentioned that the Muslims lost 6,000 men, but modern historian Joseph F. O'Callaghan considered this figure to be exaggerated. Upon hearing the news, Pope Clement V congratulated James on the victory. The defeated relief forces remained in the vicinity, and continued to harass the besiegers.

In late August or early September, the city defenders repelled an assault by the Aragonese forces. (Note: Harvey 1992, p. 175 dated the assault at 21 Rabi al-Awwal 709 AH, circa 29 August, while O'Callaghan 2011, p. 132 says "early September") The attackers used scaling ladders and siege towers which were loaded with troops and moved by wheels. The defenders resisted by pouring boiling oil and other flammables on the assailants. As a result, one of the siege towers was burnt and the assault was aborted. During the retreat, many assailants were left behind and captured by the Muslims. After this failure, the Aragonese continued to lob rocks weighing up to thirty pounds into the city. The attackers also employed sappers to dig tunnels with the goal of undermining the foundation of the walls, but the defenders employed counter-sappers who found the tunnels. An underground combat ensued which resulted in the destruction of the attackers' tunnels.

In mid or late September, Granada made peace with the Marinids, in exchange for surrendering the western towns of Algeciras (besieged by Castile) and Ronda. Not only did this mean that there was one less enemy for Granada, but the Marinids also took over the responsibilities for defending Algeciras, freeing Nasr to strengthen his eastern flank. On 17 September a Volunteers of the Faith contingent sent from Granada under Uthman ibn Abi al-Ula arrived in Marchena near Almería and defeated a small Aragonese force. This relief contingent camped nearby and continuously frustrated the besiegers by harassing their foraging parties. On 15 October, the Aragonese reported a victory against a Muslim army of 60,000, killing 2,000 and taking others prisoners, numbers considered "surely [..] an exaggeration" by O'Callaghan. James sent warnings of Muslim counter-attacks to his cities of Murcia and Lorca.

As the siege continued, the invaders tried to use a stratagem to trick the defenders. A group of Christian soldiers slipped out in the darkness and then approached the city dressed in burnouses to make the defenders think that they were Muslims. Another group of Christian knights then pretended to give them a chase and to leave their tents unguarded. The tents were made to look as a tempting target for pillage while in fact they were set up for an ambush. A group of riders then came out of the city to pillage the tents, but the Christians came out of their concealed positions too soon, allowing the riders to escape. Most of them managed to reenter the city via the side entrance that happened to be made ready to open the day before, but some were left behind. They then had to stay at the foot of the walls, protected by covering fire from the city. When the fighting died down they reentered the city.

The siege's progress was dominated by the exchange of shots from siege engines. According to Ibn Al-Qadi 22,000 rocks were thrown throughout the siege. The attackers had eleven catapults or other such engines. The Muslims initially had just one, but when this was destroyed by enemy fire they built three more. At the end of December, a section of the walls was breached and the Christians rushed to attack it, but a Muslim force defended the section and stopped them from entering the city. (Note: Harvey 1992, p. 176 dated this breach at 22 Rajab 709 H, about 26 December, while O'Callaghan 2011, p. 132 says 5 January, which is confusing because both sources say that a truce had been agreed at the end of December.)

== Truce and Aragonese withdrawal ==
At the end of the year, the prospect for an Aragonese victory faded. Winter was coming and would endanger their forces in the field. The concurrent siege of Algeciras by Castile was weakening, which allowed Granada to deploy more forces against Aragon. In addition, winds blew from the west and prevented the besiegers from receiving supplies which came by sea from Aragon. The Granadan commander, Uthman ibn Abi al-Ula not only successfully harassed the attackers, but served as a diplomat in negotiations with James II. At the end of December, a parley took place in the Aragonese camp and both sides agreed to a truce. Under the terms of the truce, the Aragonese were to lift the siege and withdraw from Granadan territories. Due to logistical difficulties, such as a lack of vessels to bring the troops home, evacuation took place gradually and some men were left behind under Muslim protection. Some of the demoralized Aragonese tried to go home without authorization and suffered ambushes and attacks along the way, with many captured by the Muslims. At one point during the evacuation, Nasr wrote to James that the city's defenders had to put the remaining Aragonese troops under detention because they were pillaging Granadan territories. Nasr further noted that the Muslims gave them housing and food at their own expense "because some of them were starving" while waiting for the Aragonese ships to pick them up. A rumour of a renewed attack by James II circulated in the city but never materialized. The citizens of Almería removed leftover siege works outside the city walls as precautions. The Aragonese prisoners were later released in the peace settlement.

== Aftermath ==
The defeat of the Aragonese in Almería, as well as the simultaneous defense of Algeciras from Castile, were major successes for Granada. Both Castile and Aragon made peace with Granada by early 1310. According to the historian L. P. Harvey, the particularly humiliating defeat and evacuation of the Aragonese "taught [the Aragonese] a lesson" and delayed the progress of the reconquista for decades. José Ramón Hinojosa Montalvo wrote that "the material and morale failure of the Granada enterprise" caused James II to subsequently redirect his attention to the central Mediterranean, away from Granada. For Granada, the successes in Almería and Algeciras were tempered by the loss of Gibraltar to Castile, as well as the cession of Algeciras and Ronda to the Marinids. Nasr himself became unpopular and faced the rebellion of his brother-in-law Abu Said Faraj and nephew Ismail in 1311, which resulted in his dethronement and the accession of Ismail in 1314.
