= Zayyanid dinar =

The Zianid dinar, or Ziyanî, was the gold coin minted in the central Maghreb under the Berber Zayyanid dynasty and later under the Regency of Algiers, where, along with the dinar of Béjaïa and Constantine, it remained an important monetary standard due to its gold content.

Under the Regency of Algiers, it continued to be minted in Tlemcen and used in the west, but also in Algiers and the central part of the country until the 17th century, due to the city's supply of Sudanese gold. The weight of these coins varied depending on wear and the quality of the minting, ranging from 4.58g to 4.66g.

The Zayanî had gold subdivisions: half, quarter, and eighth. The Zayanî also had its silver counterpart, the "dobla ziyaniya" or "dobla morisca". The Zianid coinage is part of the Almohad tradition, particularly in terms of metrology, typology, and the distribution of legends. It consists of a square inscribed within a circle, defining the spaces where the legends are stamped. It shares this format with other dynasties of the Muslim West, including the Marinids, genealogically related to the same Zenata branch.
