= Uthman ibn Abi al-Ula =

Marinid prince (died 1330)

- Shaykh al-Ghuzat
- Died: 1330; Málaga, Al-Andalus
- Dynasty: Banu Abi al-Ula (branch of the Marinid dynasty)
- 'Military career'
- Allegiance: Emirate of Granada
- Branch: Nasrid army
- Service years: 1302–1330
- Unit: Volunteers of the Faith
- Conflicts: Rebellions in Morocco; Siege of Almería; Battle of Sierra Elvira; Battle of Teba

Abu Sa'id Uthman ibn Abi al-Ula (Arabic: ابو سعید عثمان بن أَبِي العلا; also Don Uzmén in Castilian sources; died 1330) was a Marinid prince who led an unsuccessful rebellion aiming to capture the throne, and fled to the Nasrid Emirate of Granada in its aftermath. There he served as the Commander (shaykh al-ghuzat) of the Volunteers of the Faith of Granada, and became one of the most important political figures of the Nasrid realm.

Descended from a branch of the Marinid dynasty, he entered the Nasrid service under Muhammad III after a failed rebellion against Sultan Abu Yaqub Yusuf in his native Morocco. He was appointed to lead the Volunteers of the Faith in the western city of Málaga. When Muhammad III came into conflict with Abu Yaqub Yusuf over Ceuta, Uthman allied himself with Granada, conquered a part of Morocco and declared himself Sultan. He was eventually defeated in 1309 by Abu al-Rabi Sulayman, Abu Yaqub's grandson who became Sultan since 1308.

He then returned to Granada, assisting with the relief of Almería against an Aragonese siege of 1309. He and the Volunteers under his command played an important role in the overthrow of Emir Nasr in favour of his nephew Ismail I. Under Ismail, he was appointed the overall chief of the Volunteers (shaykh al-ghuzat) and in this role won a decisive victory against a Castilian Army at the 1319 Battle of Sierra Elvira. His power continued to grow, alienating other ministers in the Emirate, including the Vizier Muhammad ibn al-Mahruq. The struggle between Uthman and Ibn al-Mahruq escalated to a civil war, which ended with Ibn al-Mahruq's assassination on the order of Sultan Muhammad IV and Uthman's retention of his previous power. He lost a battle against Castile in the Battle of Teba in 1330, and died on the same year at Málaga.

== Origin and first entry into Nasrid service ==
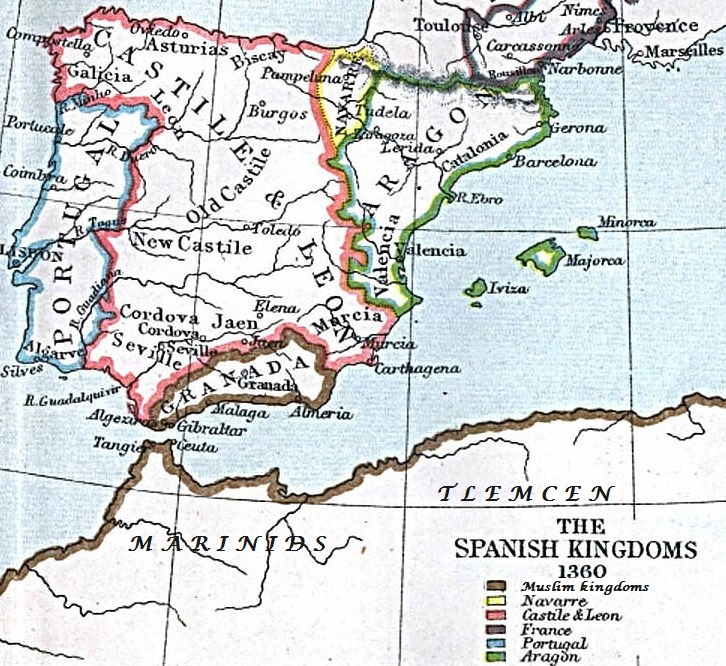
Granada, Marinid Morocco, and the Christian kingdoms of the Iberian peninsula in the 14th century

Uthman belonged to the Banu Abi al-Ula, a family related to the Berber Marinid dynasty ruling over Morocco, many of whose members served as governors and administrative officials. Nevertheless, during the rule of the Marinid sultan Abu Yaqub Yusuf an-Nasr (r. 1286–1307), several members of this family rose in revolt against him. Like two other clans related to the Marinids and engaged in failed rebellions, the Banu Idris and Banu Rahhu, from 1286 dissident members of the Banu Abi al-Ula began finding refuge across the Straits of Gibraltar in the Emirate of Granada, where they and their followers were granted privileges and enlisted by the Nasrid emirs as "Volunteers of the Faith" against the encroachments of the Christian realms of Aragon and Castile.

Uthman, who was to be the most prominent of these rebels, and eventually the most famous leader of the "Volunteers of the Faith", left North Africa in 1302 and entered Nasrid service under Muhammad III (r. 1302–1309), who appointed him as commander of a detachment of "Volunteers of the Faith" at Málaga.

== Rebellion in northern Morocco ==
In 1306, Uthman returned to Morocco to lead a rebellion against Abu Yaqub, claiming the sultanate for himself. Backed by the Nasrids, who had taken control of Ceuta in 1306, Uthman captured the fortress of Aludan, which became his stronghold and base of operations. Taking advantage of Abu Yaqub's preoccupation with his attempt to capture Tlemcen, Uthman was able to take the towns of Asilah and Larache, defeat a Marinid army under the command of Abu Yaqub's son Abu Salim, and extend his rule over much of the Ghomara region as well. In 1307, Ksar el-Kebir recognized him as sultan.

After Abu Yaqub's death, his successor Abu Thabit Amir (r. 1307–1308) faced multiple revolts, but still concentrated much of his efforts against Uthman. The general al-Hasan ibn Amir ibn Abdallah An'ayab, first sent against Uthman, was unable to subdue him, and in June 1308, the rebel prince defeated another Marinid army under Abd al-Haqq ibn Uthman ibn Muhammad, and recaptured Ksar el-Kebir. These setbacks forced Abu Thabit to take the field in person against Uthman: he captured Aludan by assault and the town of Domna, but his sudden death in 1308 cut short his plans and gave Uthman a reprieve.

It was the new Marinid sultan, Abu al-Rabi Sulayman (r. 1308–1310), who in 1309 succeeded in defeating Uthman at Aladan and forcing him to abandon North Africa and seek refuge in the Nasrid emirate.

== Return to Nasrid service ==
Map of the Nasrid Emirate of Granada in 1306

Immediately after his arrival in Granada, Uthman was ordered to assist the port city of Almería, which was being besieged by James II of Aragon. During the siege he distinguished himself not only through victories in clashes with the Christians, but also in his diplomatic skill in the negotiations that ended the siege.

=== Overthrow of Nasr and defeat of the Castilian invasion ===
In 1314, as commander of the North African garrison at Málaga, he played a critical role in the overthrow of Emir Nasr (r. 1309–1314), since it was the promise of support by his troops that gave the decisive impetus to the conspiracy to raise Ismail I (r. 1314–1325) to the Nasrid throne. For reasons that are unknown, Nasr had become increasingly unpopular, and was dethroned on 8 February 1314, but allowed to retire to Guadix as its governor. While Uthman's support was crucial for the accession of Ismail I, not all North African troops followed him: the Zanata princes Abd al-Haqq ibn Uthman and Hammu ibn Abd al-Haqq ibn Rahhu and their men remained loyal to Nasr and followed him to Guadix.

Nasr did not reconcile himself to his fate, and planned to regain his throne with the aid of Castile, whose vassal he had been since 1310. Indeed, in 1316, while Ismail laid siege to Guadix, a Castilian relief army invaded Granadan territory and marched on the city. Uthman confronted them at Wadi Fortuna, near Alicún. Details of the battle are contradictory, but it was likely won, albeit narrowly, by the Castilians, who thus gained a foothold close to Granada.

Uthman's power and prestige grew continually in Granada, and he was able to secure his position as shaykh al-ghuzat (overall commander of the "Volunteers of the Faith") by side-lining potential rivals, such as his distaff relatives, the Banu Rahhu ibn Abdallah clan, which was exiled to Tunis. Such was his authority that when Granada requested Marinid aid in 1319 against an all-out Castilian attempt to capture the city, Sultan Abu Sa'id Uthman II (r. 1310–1331), fearful of the former rebel, demanded as a precondition that he be handed over to Fez and kept in prison. The offer was rejected, and Uthman led the Nasrid troops, 5,000 strong, to a major victory over the Castilian army of 7,000 at the Battle of Sierra Elvira on 26 June 1319, which resulted in the death of the Castilian commanders, Infante Peter and Infante John. In its aftermath, an eight-year peace was signed between Granada and Castile on 18 June 1320, while the political infighting that erupted among the Castilian nobility further secured Granada from that direction. Uthman won great renown in the wars against the Christians, reportedly leading in total 732 raids into Christian territory. In 1325, Uthman's forces captured the town of Rute.

=== Assassination of Ismail I and civil war against Ibn al-Mahruq ===
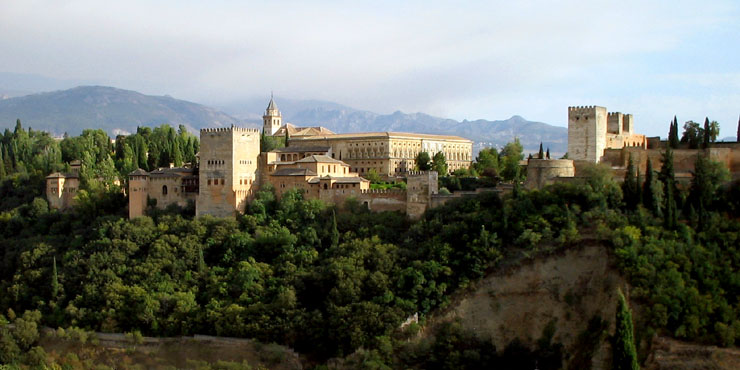
View of the Alhambra today

On 9 July 1325, Emir Ismail I was assassinated, an event for which the sources unanimously accuse Uthman of masterminding. Ismail was succeeded by Muhammad IV (r. 1325–1333), but as he was underage, he was placed under the tutelage of a senior minister. Initially, this was his father's vizier, Abu'l-Hasan ibn Masud, but he died soon after—from wounds received trying to shield Ismail—and was replaced by Muhammad ibn al-Mahruq, nominated by Uthman.

Uthman thus became the dominant figure at court: having secured complete control, not only of the Volunteers of the Faith, but of the army as its effective commander-in-chief, he now also assumed the reins of government. Soon, however, his despotic behaviour alienated the other ministers, as he deprived them of authority and appropriated the state funds almost exclusively for the payment of the Volunteers. This led Ibn al-Mahruq to fear that the ambitious Uthman was planning a coup to seize power for himself, and an open rivalry emerged between the two, which climaxed in December 1326: Uthman's troops occupied the city and forced Ibn al-Mahruq and his followers to confine themselves to the Alhambra, whereas Ibn al-Mahruq sought for a rival candidate to dispute Uthman's control of the North African troops. This was found in the person of Yahya ibn Umar ibn Rahhu, Uthman's son-in-law and a member of the Banu Rahhu clan, whom Uthman had previously banished to Tunis. Yahya was appointed shaykh al-ghuzat, leading the North African troops to abandon Uthman, who was left only with his own family's followers.

Faced with this abrupt reversal of fortune, Uthman chose to dissemble his intentions, pretending that he planned to seek refuge in North Africa. He even wrote to the Marinid sultan, Abu Sa'id Uthman, asking for a pardon and permission to return to Morocco. At the head of a thousand cavalry, he marched towards Almería, ostensibly to set sail for Morocco. Once he arrived in the city on 13 January 1327, he invited an uncle of Muhammad IV, Abu Abdallah Muhammad ibn Abi Sa'id, whom he proclaimed as sultan at the end of the month, with the laqab (regnal name) of al-Qa'im bi-amr Allah ("He who carries out God's orders"). On 4 April, he secured the submission of the fortress of Andarax, which he made into his stronghold for the struggle against Ibn al-Mahruq and Ibn Rahhu. The surrounding areas soon also recognized his authority.

In the ensuing civil war, Uthman did not hesitate to make contact with the Castilians for a common front against Granada. King Alfonso XI of Castile quickly moved to profit from the division in the Granadan state by invading its western provinces, and some Muslim sources even report that one of Uthman's sons guided King Alfonso during his invasion of the province of Ronda and the capture of Olvera in June 1327. The hard-pressed Nasrid court was forced to surrender Ronda and Marbella, followed by Algeciras in the next year, to the Marinids in exchange for troops. The losses inflicted by the civil war forced Muhammad IV to act: in July/August 1328, Muhammad IV effected a reconciliation with Uthman, who settled in Guadix, while on 6 November 1328 Muhammad IV's household slaves assassinated Ibn Mahruq. The pretender Abu Abdallah was sent to North Africa, while Uthman returned to his office as shaykh al-ghuzat. The civil war ended with Uthman firmly ensconced in his previous position.

=== Final years and the career of Uthman's sons ===
In 1330, Uthman suffered a heavy defeat at the hands of King Alfonso XI at the Battle of Teba. He died soon after, in the same year, at Málaga. His son, Abu Thabit Amir, succeeded him as shaykh al-ghuzat. Amir's opposition to the policies pursued by Muhammad IV led to the latter's murder in 1333, and the subsequent expulsion of the Banu Abi'l-Ula back to North Africa by Muhammad IV's successor, Yusuf I (r. 1333–1354). Another son of Uthman, Sulayman, fought on the side of Alfonso XI in the Battle of Río Salado in 1340. Another son of his, Idris, also entered Nasrid service after leading a failed coup to seize power at Fez in 1357, and in turn became shaykh al-ghuzat in 1359–1362.

== Sources ==
- Arié, Rachel (1973). L'Espagne musulmane au temps des Nasrides (1232–1492) (in French). Paris: E. de Boccard. OCLC 3207329.
- Fancy, Hussein (2016). The Mercenary Mediterranean: Sovereignty, Religion, and Violence in the Medieval Crown of Aragon. University of Chicago Press. ISBN 978-0-2263-2964-2.
- Harvey, L. P. (1990). Islamic Spain, 1250 to 1500. Chicago: University of Chicago Press. ISBN 978-0-226-31962-9.
- Latham, J.D. & Fernández-Puertas, A. (1993). "Naṣrids". In Bosworth, C. E.; van Donzel, E.; Heinrichs, W. P. & Pellat, Ch. (eds.). The Encyclopaedia of Islam, Second Edition. Volume VII: Mif–Naz. Leiden: E. J. Brill. pp. 1020–1029. doi:10.1163/1573-3912_islam_COM_0855. ISBN 978-90-04-09419-2.
- Manzano Rodríguez, Miguel Angel (1992). La intervención de los Benimerines en la Península Ibérica (in Spanish). Editorial CSIC – CSIC Press. ISBN 978-84-00-07220-9.
- O'Callaghan, Joseph F. (2011). The Gibraltar Crusade: Castile and the Battle for the Strait. Philadelphia, Pennsylvania: University of Pennsylvania Press. ISBN 978-0-8122-0463-6.
- Powers, David S. (2002). Law, Society and Culture in the Maghrib, 1300-1500. Cambridge University Press. ISBN 978-0-521-81691-5.
- Vidal Castro, Francisco. "Ismail I". In Real Academia de la Historia (ed.). Diccionario Biográfico electrónico. Archived from the original on 27 January 2023.
- Vidal Castro, Francisco. "Muhammad IV". In Real Academia de la Historia (ed.). Diccionario Biográfico electrónico.
