= Battle of Oujda =

1248 battle

Date	1248
Location	Temzezdekt, near Oujda, (present-day Morocco)
Result	Zayyanid victory

Belligerents
Almohad Caliphate; Marinid Sultanate	Zayyanid Sultanate

Commanders and leaders
Abu al-Hasan as-Said al-Mutadid †	Yaghmurasen ibn Zyan

Units involved
Unknown	Unknown

The Battle of Oujda occurred when the Almohad Caliph, supported by the Marinids, directed an offensive against the Zayyanids.

In 1248 the Almohads, joined by the Marinids who had just submitted to the Almohad Caliph, laid siege to the fortress where Yaghmurasen ibn Zyan was staying. The Almohad Caliph Abu al-Hasan as-Said al-Mutadid had set up camp and invited Yaghmurasen to submit to him and recognise him as his overlord. Yaghmurasen rejected this invitation and the Almohad Caliph marched against him, the Almohad Caliph was ambushed and defeated by Yaghmurasen. The fighting took place in front of the Temzezdekt fortress, south of Oujda.

The Almohad caliph was mortally wounded by a spear blow from a certain Yusuf ben Abd el Mumin, and Ya'kub ben Jabar, a cousin of Yaghmurasan, killed the vizier Yahya ibn Attuch. The death of Caliph Abu al-Hasan as-Said al-Mutadid caused the dispersal of the Almohad besiegers. In an alternative version, Yaghmurasen out of respect for the caliphal dignity dismounts and expresses his regrets. The injured caliph died shortly after.

The Mu'minid caliph abandons a substantial booty in the hands of the Zianid victors: the Koran of Othman Ibn Affan, third caliph of Islam, (an original copy of the Koranic vulgate having belonged to the Umayyad caliphs, then Umayyads of Cordoba before to be taken by the Almohads during their conquest of Spain), the Dragon's necklace, named in thoban and a number of valuable objects.

The Almohad Caliph was killed, his head was taken and ordered to be shown to the mother of the Ziyyanid sultan, who had advised her son to surrender before the battle and to whom he had, in response, promised to bring the head of his enemy.

The victory enhanced the prestige of Yaghmurasen who then only held the title of amir al muslimin. He is seen as the equal of the other sovereigns of the Maghreb.
