= Muhammad ibn al-Mahruq =

Muhammad ibn al-Mahruq (Arabic: محمد بن المحروق) was a minister in the Emirate of Granada. He served as the wakil, the superintendent of the sultan's finances, during the reign of Ismail I (r. 1314–1325). He stayed in the post at the accession of Muhammad IV, and a few months later elevated to vizier, replacing Abu al-Hasan ibn Mas'ud who died. From late 1326, Ibn al-Mahruq was involved in a civil war against a political rival, Uthman ibn Abi al-Ula. To end the civil war, Muhammad IV ordered him assassinated on 6 November 1328, during his meeting with the Sultan's grandmother Fatima bint al-Ahmar.
