= Abu Hammu Musa I =

Ruler of the Tlemcen Kingdom (r. 1308–1318)

- Dinar of Abu Hammu Musa I

Sultan of Tlemcen
- Reign: 1308–1318
- Predecessor: Abu Zayyan I
- Successor: Abu Tashufin I
- Born: 1266
- Died: 22 July 1318 (aged 52)
- Issue: Abu Tashufin I; Abu Tashufin II
Names
- Musa ibn Abī Saʿīd Uthman
- House: Zayyanid

Musa ibn Abī Saʿīd ʿUt̲h̲mān ibn Yag̲h̲murāsan (Arabic: أبو حمو موسى الأول) (died 1318), known as Abu Hammu Musa I, was the fourth Zayyanid Sultan of the Kingdom of Tlemcen. He was proclaimed Sultan on 21 S̲h̲awwāl 707/15 April 1308 after the death of his brother Abu-I Zayyan I. He ruled until 1318, when he was assassinated at the hands of his son Abu Tashufin I, who ascended the throne in his place.

== Biography ==
When Abū Ḥammū Musa came to the throne, the Kingdom of Tlemcen was facing a serious crisis, following the long and devastating Marinid Siege of Tlemcen. Abū Ḥammū continued his brother's policy of seeking to restore the Zayyanid's power by managing to pacify the kingdom. He regained his authority over the Banu Tujin and Maghrawa tribes and re-established control over the coastal cities of Bijaya and Constantine. The fortifications of the kingdom were strengthened and he managed to prevent Marinids from expanding beyond the city of Oujda. As he was busy maintaining a strong army, he showed little interest in the material and intellectual needs of his subjects. He often mistreated his son Abu Tashufin, who assassinated him and then succeeded him on the throne on 22 Jumada I 718/22 July 1318.

Abu Hammu Musa I Zayyanid
Preceded by Abu Zayyan I	Sultan of Tlemcen; 1308–1318	Succeeded by Abu Tashufin I
