= Abu Sa'id Uthman I, Abd al-Wadid =

Ruler of the Sultanate of Tlemcen from 1283 to 1303

Abu Sa'id Uthman I

Sultan of Tlemcen
- Reign: 1283–1304
- Predecessor: Yaghmurasen Ibn Zyan
- Successor: Abu Zayyan Muhammad I
- Born: 1233
- Died: 5 June 1304 (aged 71); Tlemcen
- Issue: Abu Zayyan Muhammad I; Abu Hammu Musa I
- Dynasty: Zayyanid
- Father: Yaghmurasen Ibn Zyan
- Religion: Islam
- Occupation: Warrior, Monarch
- Arabic name
- Personal (Ism): Uthman عثمان
- Patronymic (Nasab): ibn Yaghmurasen ابن يغمراسن
- Teknonymic (Kunya): Abu Sa'id أبو سعيد

Abu Sa'id Uthman I (Arabic: أبو سعيد عثمان الأول), or Othmane ibn Yaghmurasen or in Algerian Arabic ( أبو سعيد عثمان الأول, Abu Sa'id Othman āl-awel), ruled the Zenata Berber Kingdom of Tlemcen (in modern day Algeria) from March 1283 to June 1304.

== Biography ==
Abu Said Uthman I succeeded his father Yaghmurasen ibn Zayan (reigned 1236–1283) as ruler of the Zayyanid dynasty. Through marriages with the Hafsids, he was able to establish good relations with his eastern neighbours. This allowed Uthman I to withstand the ongoing attacks of the Marinids of Fez. The siege of Tlemcen by the Marinids was maintained from 1299 to 1307 during which time the Marinids built the siege city of al-Mansura, which was at times even used as the residence of the Marinid rulers. Despite the superiority of the Marinids, the Zayyanids were able to withstand the siege.

Abu Said Uthman I did not live to see the end of the siege. Only under his successor Abu Zayyan I (reigned 1304-1308), did the Marinids withdraw back to Al-Maghrib (al-Aqsa) following the death of their sultan, and the subsequent dynastic infighting weakened their power.

== Expeditions ==
Abu Said Uthman I led many military actions designed to consolidate his power and strengthen his position against his rivals (mainly the Marinids).

- In 1287 he captured the city of Mâzoûna (located on the right bank of the Chelif River from the Maghrawa) and laid siege to the city of Taferdjint (possibly on the left bank of the Chelif River in the country of the Toudjin).
- During 1290–91, he launched another expedition against the Toudjin. He marched through their lands and took control of the Wâncharis mountains, which was their refuge. Uthman I took the family members of Mohammed Ibn‘Abd el-Qawi as prisoners but later sent them back to their home.
- During May 1289, he captured the city of Ténès from the Maghrawas and captured the city of Médéa from the Toudjin.
- The Marinid Sultan Abu Yaqub Yusuf an-Nasr marched against Tlemcen in July 1290. After a siege lasting two months in September 1290 the Marinid Sultan returned to his capital.
- A month later Abu Said Uthman I attacked the Maghrawas who had established relations with the Marinid ruler during the siege of Tlemcen. He conquered their lands and forced them to obeisance, leaving his son Abu Hammu I in command of the city of Chelif. Abu Said Uthman I then returned to Tlemcen.
- In April 1291, Abu Said Uthman I marched against the Toudjin once more. He killed their leader and devastated their lands.
- During 1293–94 Abu Said Uthman I took the city of Brechk located 19 miles west from Cherchell and 8 miles East of Ténès from Tsabit ben Mandil of the Maghrawa after 40 days of siege. Tasbit fled to Al-Maghreb (al-Aqsa) by sea.
- During 1295–96, the Marinid Sultan marched against Tlemcen for the second time. He camped under the walls of Nedroma, then headed to Mount Djidara (near Oran) before returning back to his kingdom.

== See also ==
- Medieval Algeria topics

Abu Sa'id Uthman I, Abd al-Wadid Zayyanid dynasty
Preceded by Yaghmurasen Ibn Zyan	Sultan of Tlemcen, Kingdom of Tlemcen; 1283–1303	Succeeded by Abu Zayyan I
