= Abu Zayyan Muhammad I =

Ruler of the Tlemcen Kingdom (r. 1304–1308)

Sultan of Tlemcen
- Reign: 6 June 1304 – 14 April 1308
- Predecessor: Abu Sa'id Uthman I
- Successor: Abu Hammu I
- Born: 1263
- Died: 14 April 1308 (aged 44-45); Tlemcen
- House: Zayyanid
- Religion: Islam
- Occupation: Monarch; Politician; Military leader
- Arabic name
- Personal (Ism): Muhammad محمد
- Patronymic (Nasab): ibn Uthman ابن عثمان
- Teknonymic (Kunya): Abu Zayyan أبو زيان

Abu Zayyan Muhammad ibn Abi Said Uthman ibn Yaghmurasan (Arabic: أبو زيان الأول) (died 1308), known as Abu Zayyan Muhammad I, was the third Zayyanid Sultan of the Kingdom of Tlemcen. He succeeded his father Abu Said Uthman I on June 6, 1304.

== Biography ==
=== Siege of Tlemcen ===
Five years before his accession to the throne, under the reign of his father Abu Sa'id Uthman I, the Marinids, led by Sultan Abu Yaqub Yusuf an-Nasr, arrived in front the walls of Tlemcen, launching one of the longest sieges in history, which lasted eight years and three months, so much so that the Marinid siege field become a real city, known as al-Mansura. Muhammad ascended the throne after the death due to a stroke of his father in 1304, the fifth year of siege. When Muhammad ascended the throne Tlemcen was now exhausted and the population (which was very loyal to zayyanid dynasty and had until then resisted with great courage) began negotiations to reach an agreement for the capitulation, however, Muhammad convinced the city to resist again and he formed a new army and continued the defense.

To try to put away the besiegers, the ambassadors of Abu Zayyan convinced the Nasrid sultan, Muhammad III, to foment an uprising of a pretender to the Marinid throne, a certain Uthman ibn Idris, who landed in the Maghreb with a Granadian army and conquered Ceuta in 1306, proclaimed himself Sultan of the Maghreb. However, the Sultan Abu Ya'qub ignored the threat that had broken out in the north of his reign, preferring to carry on the siege of Tlemcen, now exhausted, it seemed was going to fall. Uthman ibn idris' troops, unchallenged, managed to conquer the city of Asilah, Larache and much of Ghomara region.

In May 1307, Sultan Abu Yusuf Ya'qub was assassinated in the field of siege by a eunuch, for unclear reasons, probably for reasons related to internal conspiracies of his harem. He was succeeded by his nephew, Abu Thabit 'Amir who, wisely, chose to end the siege of Tlemcen to go to face the rebel Uthman ibn Idris in Ceuta.

=== Attempts to restore zayyanid power ===
Immediately after the end of the siege, Abu Zayyan Muhammad and his brother Abu Hammou I launched a campaign against the tribes of the eastern part of his kingdom who had supported the enemy; the Tudjin Berbers were forced to submit and pay tribute, the Arab tribes were severely treated and driven back into the desert. On his return to Tlemcen, he devoted himself to repairing the damage caused by the siege but died shortly afterwards, on 14 April 1308.

Abu Zayyan Muhammad I Zayyanid
Preceded by Abu Said Uthman I	Sultan of Tlemcen, Kingdom of Tlemcen; 1304–1308	Succeeded by Abu Hammu I
