= Abu Thabit 'Amir =

Marinid Sultan (r. 1307–1308)

- Amīr al-Muslimīn

Marinid Sultan
- Reign: May 1307 – 28 July 1308
- Predecessor: Abu Yaqub Yusuf an-Nasr
- Successor: Abu al-Rabi Sulayman
- Born: 12 September 1284
- Died: 28 July 1308 (aged 23); Tanger
Names
- Abū Thābit ʿAmir al-Marīni
- Dynasty: Marinid
- Father: Abu Yaqub Yusuf an-Nasr
- Religion: Islam

Abu Thabit 'Amir ibn Yusuf (Arabic: أبو ثابت عامر) (1284–28 July 1308) was a Marinid ruler for around a year. Son or grandson of Abu Yaqub Yusuf, whom he succeeded in 1307.

== Biography ==
The Marinid sultan Abu Yaqub Yusuf was in the Kingdom of Tlemcen laying siege to the Abd al-Wadid capital when he was assassinated. During this long siege, which had been in place since 1299, the Marinid sultan was unable to prevent a Nasrid-sponsored pretender Uthman ibn Abi al-Ula from landing in Ceuta in 1306 and seizing much of northern Morocco. The new Marinid sultan Abu Thabit, whose ascendancy was contested by four pretenders, had to choose between pressing the siege or recovering his dominions. He opted for the latter.

Acting quickly, Abu Thabit dispatched three of the pretenders, then struck a deal with the Abd al-Wadid ruler Abu Zayyan I to allow an orderly lifting of the siege of Tlemcen. Abu Thabit rushed his troops back to Morocco to take on the fourth pretender, Uthman, leaving little or no garrisons to hold the Marinid positions in his wake. The Abd al-Wadids set about razing the Marinid siege camp at Tlemcen (by now, evolved into a veritable city, known as 'al-Mahalla al-Mansura') and proceeded down the coast to Oujda, rolling back the hard-won Marinid gains of the last few years.

To coordinate his operations against Uthman, Abu Thabit erected a new town, Tetouan, just south of Ceuta.

In July 1308, Abu Thabit fell ill and died in Tetouan. He was succeeded by his brother, Abu al-Rabi Sulayman as Marinid sultan.

== Sources ==
- C. A. Julien, Histoire de l'Afrique du Nord, des origines à 1830, Payot (1961, reedit. orig. 1931)
- C. E. Bosworth, The New Islamic Dynasties: A Chronological and Genealogical Manual, Edinburgh University Press (2004), pp. 41–42 ISBN 9780748621378

Preceded by Abu Yaqub Yusuf	Marinid Dynasty; 1307–1308	Succeeded by Abu al-Rabi Sulayman
