= Abu al-Rabi Sulayman =

Marinid Sultan (r. 1308–1310)

Abu ar-Rabi Sulayman
- Marinid Sultan; Amīr al-Muslimīn

Marinid Sultan
- Reign: July 1308 – 23 November 1310
- Predecessor: Abu Thabit Amir
- Successor: Abu Sa'id Uthman II
- Born: March 1289
- Died: 23 November 1310 (aged 21)
Names
- Abū ar-Rabīʿ Sulaymān al-Marīni
- Dynasty: Marinid
- Father: Abu Yaqub Yusuf
- Religion: Islam

Abu ar-Rabi Sulayman (Arabic: أبو الربيع سليمان abū ar-rabīʿ sulaymān) (March 1289 – 23 November 1310, reigned 28 July 1308 – 23 November 1310) was a Marinid ruler. He was the son or grandson of Abu Yaqub Yusuf and brother of Abu Thabit Amir, whom he succeeded in 1308, at the age of 19.

== Biography ==
Abu ar-Rabi Sulayman succeeded his brother Abu Thabit Amir as Marinid Sultan in July 1308. Abu Thabit had died at Tetouan in the Rif, while laying siege to Ceuta, then held by Othman ibn Idris, a Nasrid-sponsored pretender to the Marinid throne. It is alleged that emissaries of Abu al-Rabi were party to the talks at Alcalá de Henares in late 1309 between Ferdinand IV of Castile and James II of Aragon directed against the Nasrid sultan Muhammad III of Granada. After Muhammad III was deposed in a palace coup by his brother Nasr in March 1309, the Nasrids were quick to repair relations, abandoning the pretender Othman ibn Idris and actively assisting Abu al-Rabi in recovering Ceuta in July 1309.

The Marinids were quick to return the favour. Abu al-Rabi dispatched a Marinid fleet to force the Castilians to lift the siege of Algeciras in January 1310, and dispatched sufficient North African troops to assist the Granadines to fend off the Aragonese landing near Almería.

As part of the deal, a marriage treaty was contracted between Abu al-Rabi and a Granadine princess. The Nasrid ruler Nasr of Granada granted the Iberian towns of Algeciras and Ronda to the Marinids as dowry.

Abu al-Rabi Sulayman fell ill and died in November 1310. Without sons of his own, he was succeeded by an uncle, Abu Sa'id Uthman II as Marinid sultan of Morocco.

== Sources ==
- C.A. Julien, Histoire de l'Afrique du Nord, des origines à 1830, Payot (1961, reedit. orig. 1931)
- C.E. Bosworth, The New Islamic Dynasties: A Chronological and Genealogical Manual, Edinburgh University Press (2004), pp. 41–42 ISBN 9780748621378

Preceded by Abu Thabit Amir	Marinid Dynasty; 1308–1310	Succeeded by Abu Sa'id Uthman II
