= Abu Sa'id Uthman II =

Marinid Sultan (r. 1310–1331)

- Marinid Sultan; Amīr al-Muslimīn

Marinid Sultan
- Reign: November 1310 – August 1331
- Predecessor: Abu al-Rabi Sulayman
- Successor: Abu al-Hasan Ali ibn Othman
- Born: December 1276; Fez
- Died: August 1331 (aged 54); Taza
Names
- Abū Saʿīd ʿUthmān ibn Yūsuf al-Marīnī
- Dynasty: Marinid
- Father: Abu Yusuf Yaqub ibn Abd al-Haqq
- Mother: Aisha bint Mhalhal al-Kholtī
- Religion: Islam

Abu Sa'id Uthman II (Arabic: أبو سعيد عبد الله عثمان بن يوسف ابو يعقوب; Abū Sa'īd 'Abdullāh 'Uthmān ibn Yūsuf Abū Ya'qūb; [abu: saʕi:d ʕuθma:n bin ju:suf]) (December 1276 – August 1331) was the 9th Marinid sultan, reigning from 1310 to 1331. A younger son of Abu Yusuf Yaqub ibn Abd al-Haqq, Abū Sa'īd 'Uthmān succeeded his nephew Abū al-Rabï' Sulaymān in November 1310, at the age of 33.

== Biography ==
His full name was Abū Sa'īd 'Uthmān ibn Yūsuf Abū Ya'qūb ibn 'Abd al-Ḥaqq. He was the son of Abu Yusuf Yaqub ibn Abd al-Haqq and his wife ʿĀʾisha bint Abī’l-Aṭiyya who was a daughter of the emir of the Khulṭ Arabs, Abī’l-Aṭiyya Mhalhal ibn Yahya al-Khulṭī. Abu Sa'id Uthman was described by his biographer as being of a white complexion, average height and well featured.

=== Reign ===
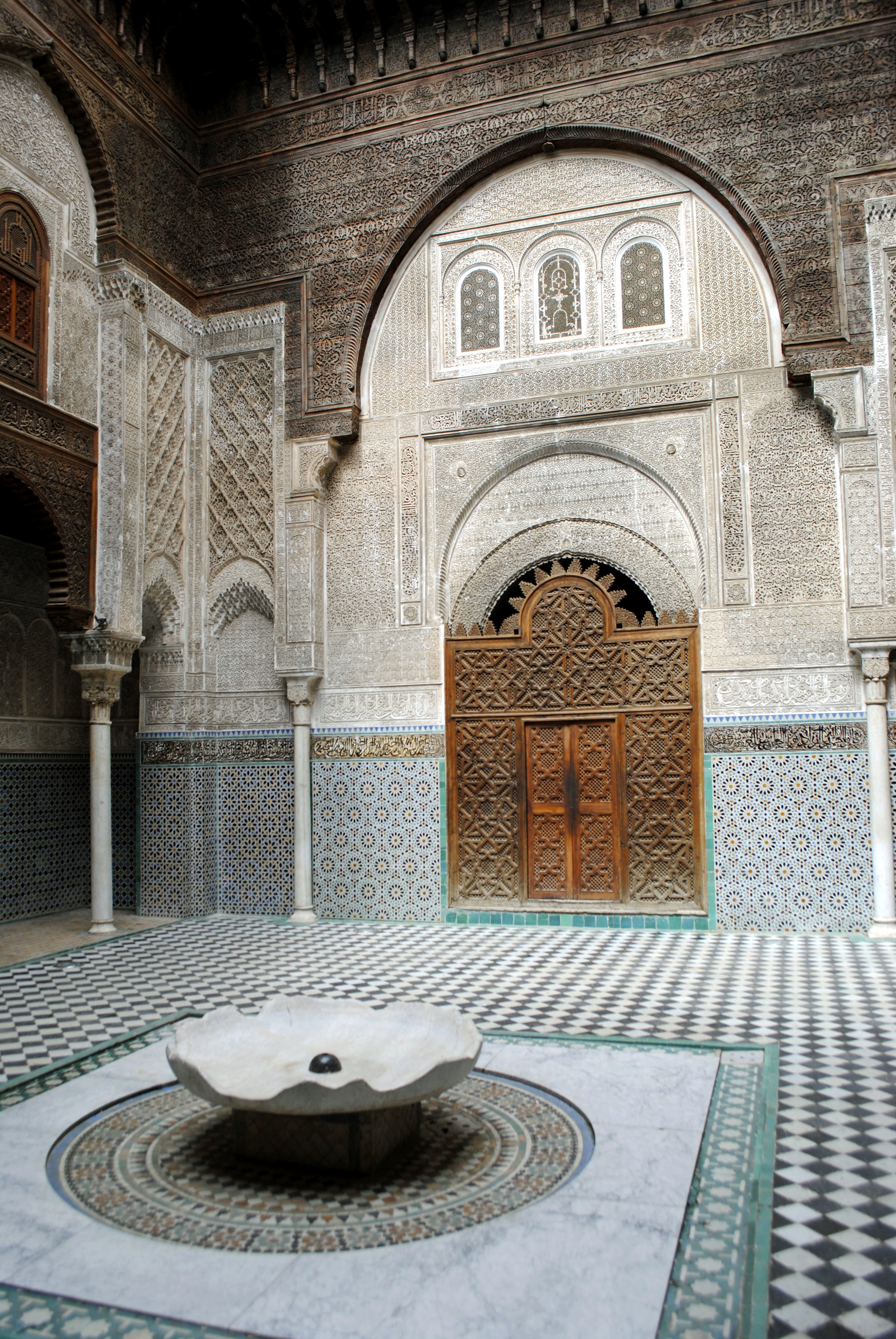
Al-Attarine Madrasa, built in 1323–25 during Abu Sa'id Uthman II's reign.

Abu Sa'id Uthman ascended to power after a tumultuous period during which the Marinids had survived a dangerous rebellion in Ceuta, a long conflict with the Kingdom of Tlemcen and a severe check from Ferdinand IV of Castile, who, in the previous year (1309–10), had seized Gibraltar and laid siege to Marinid-owned Algeciras.

Pious and preferring peace, Abu Sa'id Uthman refrained from any great enterprises. In 1313, hoping to divest himself of any entanglements on the Iberian Peninsula, he returned the towns of Algeciras and Ronda to the Naṣrid ruler Nasr of Granada.

In 1315, Abu Sa'id Uthman faced a rebellion by his son and designated heir, Abu Ali, who ensconced himself in Fez. At first not enthusiastic about a confrontation, the sultan entered into negotiations which would pass the Marinid state over to his son and leave himself as governor of Taza. But Abu Sa'id Uthman gained courage when he heard Abu Ali had fallen ill, and hurried to lay siege to Fez and secure his son's capitulation. Abu Ali was removed from the line of succession, in favour of another son, Abu al-Ḥasan Ali. However, Abu Sa'id Uthman granted Abu Ali an appanage centered on Sijilmasa in present day southern Morocco, which he would rule as a quasi-independent state for the next couple of decades. In 1316, Yahya ibn Afzi, governor of Ceuta, revolted against the Marinid sultan, and managed to maintain Ceuta as effectively independent for nearly a dozen years, before returning to the fold.

In 1319, facing a renewed challenge from Castile, the Naṣrid ruler Ismail I of Granada appealed to the Marinid sultan for assistance, but Abu Sa'id Uthman imposed such onerous conditions that the Granadines decided to handle the matter without him.

In 1320 his son Abu Ali renewed his revolt against his father. From his base in Sijilmasa, Abu Ali seized control of much of southern Morocco (including Marrakesh), threatening to split the Marinid dominions in two. In 1322, the Marinid sultan Abu Sa'id Uthman marched against the south and defeated Abu Ali at the Oum er-Rebia. But, once again, he reconciled with his son and allowed him to retain Sijilmasa.

Abu Sa'id Uthman built three significant madrasas in Fez: Fez al-Jedid (1320), Es-Sahrij (1321) and Al-Attarine (1323).

In 1329, pressed by an invasion from Abdalwadid sultan Abu Tashufin of Tlemcen, the Ḥafṣid ruler Abu Bakr of Ifriqiya appealed to the Marinid sultan Abu Sa'id Uthman for assistance, offering his daughter Fatimah as a bride for the Marinid heir Abu al-Ḥasan. Satisfied by the terms, Abu Sa'id Uthman arranged a diversionary raid against Tlemcen from the west, while dispatching a Marinid fleet to support the Ḥafṣid efforts in the east.

=== Death and succession ===
In August 1331, while arranging for the reception of the Tunisian princess, Abu Sa'id Uthman fell ill and died in the environs of Taza. He was succeeded by his son and designated heir Abu al-Hasan, although his other son Abu Ali retained his quasi-independent appanage in the south.

== Biography ==
- Julien, Charles-André, Histoire de l'Afrique du Nord, des origines à 1830, édition originale 1931, réédition Payot, Paris, 1961

Preceded by Abū al-Rabī' Sulaymān	Marīnīd; 1310–1331	Succeeded by Abū al-Ḥasan
