= Abu Yaqub Yusuf an-Nasr =

Marinid Sultan (r. 1286–1307)

- Sultan of Morocco; Amīr al-Muslimīn
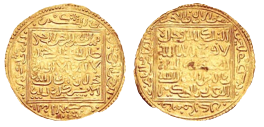
- Dinar of Abu Yaqub Yusuf

Marinid Sultan
- Reign: March 1286 – 13 May 1307
- Predecessor: Abu Yusuf Yaqub ibn Abd al-Haqq
- Successor: Abu Thabit Amir
- Died: 13 May 1307; Tlemcen
Names
- Abū Yaʿqūb Yūsuf ibn Yaʿqūb al-Marīni
- Dynasty: Marinid
- Father: Abū Yūsuf Yaʿqūb ibn ʿAbd al-Ḥaqq
- Mother: Lalla Oum'el'Iz bint Mohammed al-Alaoui
- Religion: Islam

Abu Yaqub Yusuf an-Nasr (Arabic: أَبُو يُوسُف يَعقُوب الناصر, romanized: abū yūsuf ya`qūb an-nāṣr) (died 13 May 1307) was a Marinid ruler. He was the son of Abu Yusuf Ya'qub, whom he succeeded in 1286. His mother was a sharifa, Lalla Oum'el'Iz bint Mohammed al-Alaoui. He was assassinated in 1307.

== Biography ==
Abu Yaqub Yusuf succeeded his father Abu Yusuf Ya'qub in March 1286, shortly after the latter's expedition to Spain and peace treaty with Sancho IV of Castile. The accession was contested by several of his relatives, including his brother, some of whom were backed by and received protection from the Abdalwadid rulers of the Kingdom of Tlemcen. In response to this threat, one of Abu Yaqub's first acts was to reach agreement on a fresh treaty with the Nasrid ruler Muhammad II of Granada, ceding all Marinid possessions in Spain, with the exception of Algeciras, Tarifa, Ronda and Guadix. (Although Guadix would pass over to the Granada later in 1288).

In November 1288, Abu Yaqub's own son Abu Amir, hatched a conspiracy to depose him. The plot was soon discovered and stopped, but Abu Amir and his advisers took refuge in the court of the Abdalwadid ruler Abu Said Othman of Tlemcen. Abu Yaqub was soon reconciled with his son, but demanded that his fellow conspirators be handed over for justice. Othman refused to release them. A Marinid fleet blockaded Tlemcen through much of 1290, but to little effect.

In 1291, the truce with Sancho IV of Castile expired, so hostilities in Spain were renewed. While Abu Yaqub was busy against Tlemcen, Sancho IV conspired with the Nasrid sultan Muhammad II of Granada to seize the three remaining Marinid citadels in Spain - Tarifa, Algeciras and Ronda - for themselves. With Granadine assistance, the Marinid citadel of Tarifa fell to Sancho IV in October 1292. But Sancho refused to honor his agreement to hand the citadel over to Granada, and instead he decided to keep Tarifa for himself.

In response, Muhammad II immediately tried to repair relations with the Marinids. At a meeting in Tangiers in early 1293, Abu Yaqub agreed to assist Muhammad II in recovering Tarifa from Castile, but on the condition that Tarifa would be turned over to the Marinids, in return for which the Marinids would transfer their claims to Algeciras and Ronda to Granada. As part of the deal, Muhammad II handed over to Abu Yaqub four valuable 7th-century copies of the Qur'an, which had been drafted by the Caliph Uthman, which the fleeing Umayyads had brought from Damascus to Cordoba back in the 750s and had since been held by the royal treasury of Granada. The estranged Castilian prince Infante Don Juan (uncle of Sancho IV), then in exile, participated in this discussion and agreed to participate in the campaign.

Marinid Sultan Abu Yaqub undertook his first crossing of the straits in 1293 (or 1294) to lay siege of Tarifa. But the citadel, held by the Castilian noble Alonso Perez de Guzman held out. It is said that when Infante Don Juan threatened to kill Guzman's son, whom he was holding prisoner, Guzman's only response was to toss a knife from the walls and ask him to proceed.

Around 1294, while still in Spain, Abu Yaqub received word that a revolt had broken out among the Berber Wattasids of the Rif, fomented by the Abdalwadids of Tlemcen. Plans for the resumption of the siege of Tarifa were shelved, as Abu Yaqub had to spend much of the year dealing with the Rif uprising.

The failed siege of Tarifa persuaded the Marinid sultan Abu Yaqub to abandon his plans for conquering territory on the peninsula. In 1295, he formally handed over the last two remaining Marinid citadels, Algeciras and Ronda, to Muhammad II of Granada.

=== Siege of Tlemcen ===
The abandonment of his territories in Spain gave Marinid sultan Abu Yaqub a free hand to pursue a war against the Abdalwadids of Tlemcen in 1295. Marinid forces moved systematically and slowly along the coast, taking Taourirt (1295), Oujda (1296), Taount and Nedroma (1298) before finally arriving at Tlemcen in May 1299. Settling down for a long siege, Abu Yaqub erected a siege camp that turned into a veritable city, known as al-Mahalla al-Mansura ('Camp of Victory'), with markets, public baths, palaces, and mosques of its own. From here, he conducted the siege against Tlemcen, while dispatching detachments to seize the remaining coastal possessions of the Abdalwadid sultanate, all the way to Algiers.

Nonetheless, the besieged city of Tlemcen refused to fall. The death of the Abdalwadid sultan Othman in 1303 prompted the city to contemplate capitulation, but his successor Abu Zayyan I rallied the resistance and ensured it continued to hold out.

With an eye to relieving the siege, Abdalwadid agents persuaded the new Nasrid sultan Muhammad III of Granada to transport a Marinid pretender, a certain Uthman ibn Abi al-Ula, to Ceuta in 1306. Uthman landed with Granadan help and immediately proclaimed himself ruler of Morocco. But the Marinid emir Abu Yaqub, sensing his siege was finally having an effect, and Tlemcen was on the verge of falling, decided to ignore the threat in his rear and press on with the siege. Unchallenged, Uthman's partisans added the neighboring towns of Asilah, Larache and much of the Ghomara region to his cause.

On May 1307, the Marinid sultan Abu Yaqub Yusuf was assassinated in the Tlemcen siege camp by a eunuch over an obscure harem affair. He was succeeded by his son (or grandson), Abu Thabit Amir as Marinid sultan of Morocco, who opted to abandon the siege of Tlemcen and to confront Uthman in Ceuta. Abu Yaqub's twelve years of war against Tlemcen had ended with nothing to show for his efforts.

== Sources ==
- C.A. Julien, Histoire de l'Afrique du Nord, des origines à 1830, Payot (1961, reedit. orig. 1931)
- C.E. Bosworth, The New Islamic Dynasties: A Chronological and Genealogical Manual, Edinburgh University Press (2004), pp. 41–42 ISBN 9780748621378

Preceded by Abu Yusuf Ya'qub	Marinid Dynasty; 1286–1307	Succeeded by Abu Thabit Amir
