= Yaghmurasen ibn Zyan =

Zayyanid ruler of Tlemcen from 1236 to 1283

Yaghmurasen Ibn Zyan يغمراسن إبن زيان
- Amîr al-Muslîmîn; Shaykh
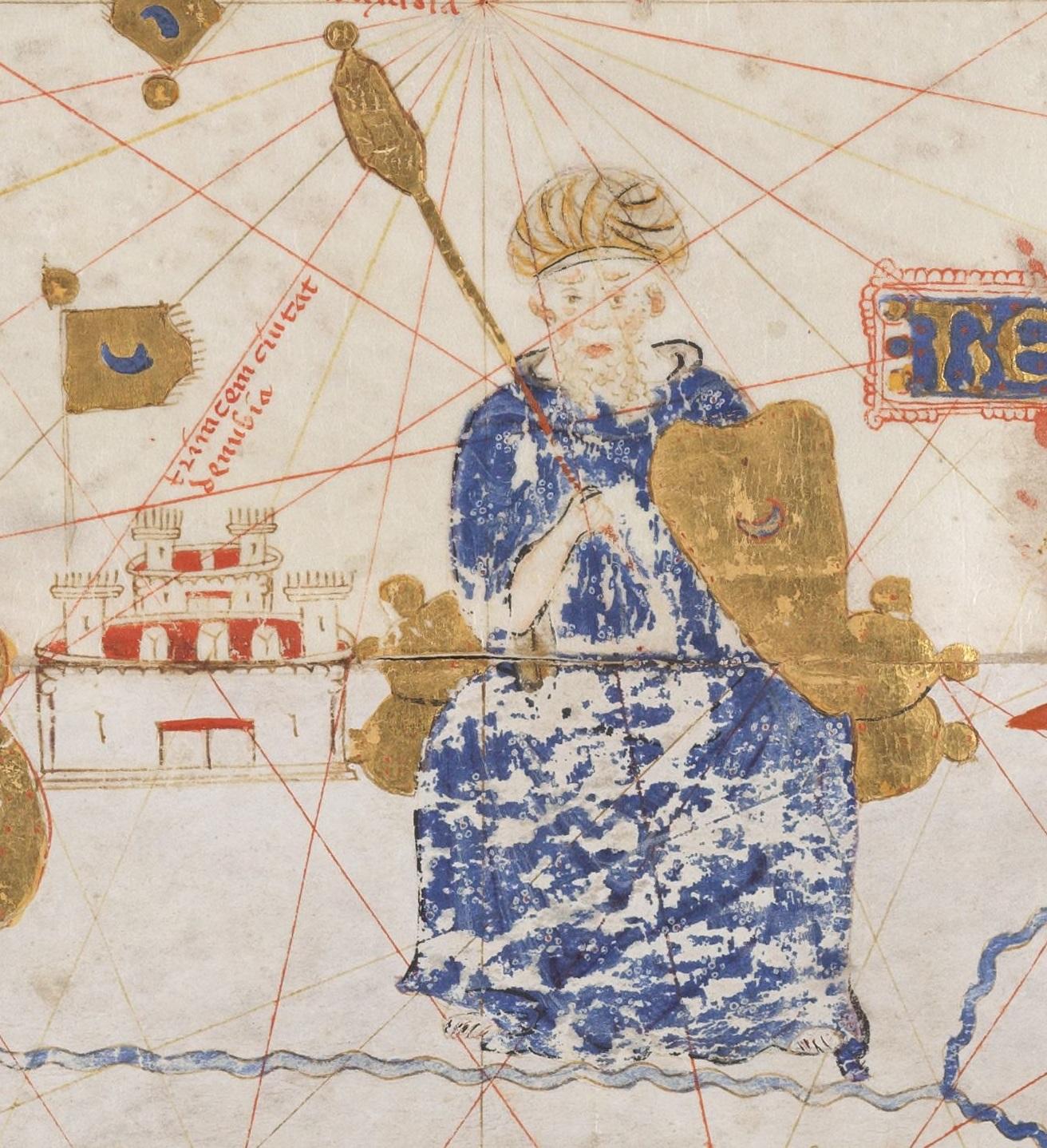
- Possible depiction of Yaghmurasen

Sultan of Tlemcen
- Reign: c.1236 – 1283
- Successor: Abu Sa'id Uthman I
- Born: 1206
- Died: February/March 1283 (aged 76–77); Miliana (present-day Algeria)
- Issue: Abu Sa'id Uthman I; Talha; Faris; Abu Zakariyya Yahya
- Dynasty: Zayyanid
- Religion: Islam
- Arabic name
- Personal (Ism): Yaghmurāsan يغمراسن
- Patronymic (Nasab): ibn Zayyān ibn Thābit ابن زيان بن ثابت
- Teknonymic (Kunya): Abū Yaḥyā أيو يحيى

Yaghmurasen Ibn Zyan (Arabic: يغمراسن إبن زيان, romanized: Yaghmurāsan ibn Zayyān; (Note: long name: Yaghmurasan ben Ziyan ben Thabet ben Mohamed ben Zegraz ben Tiddugues ben Taaullah ben Ali ben Abd al-Qasem ben Abd al-Wad. The Encyclopédie berbère gives Yaghamrāzan and Yaghmurāsim as alternative spellings for his name.) 1206 – February/March 1283) was the founder of the Zayyanid dynasty. Under his reign the Zayyanid Kingdom of Tlemcen extended over present-day north-western Algeria.

== Life ==
He was of the Zenata Berber tribe. He founded the Zayyanid state in 1235, and warred with the Almohad Caliphate until 1248. He was successful in his military campaigns against the Merinids and the Maqil Arab tribe.

The governor of Ceuta, Abou'l-Hassan ben-Khelas, had revolted against the Almohads and recognised the sovereignty of Yaghmurasen, after this the Almohad ruler decided to march against Tlemcen but was defeated by Yaghmurasen. When the Almohad Caliph marched against him, Yaghmurasen defeated him in the Battle of Oujda, the Almohad Caliphs head was taken and ordered to be shown to his mother.

Ibn Khaldun mentions anecdotes about him. Thus Yaghomracen heard genealogists who traced his descent from Muhammad. He commented about this claim in his local Berber language and said this:

If it is true, it will benefit us before God; but, in this world, we will owe our success only to our swords.

When an architect wanted to write his name on a minaret that he had built, Yaghmurasen replied in his Zenati dialect "God knows" (Issen Rebbi).

== Name ==
In his commentary on the hagiographic book of Ibn al-Zayyat al-Tadili (Attashawof), Ahmed Toufiq explains that Yaghmur/Ighmur means "the virile/stallion." According to Michael Peyron, the name Yaghmurasen appears to have a Berber etymology, yugh amur nsen meaning "he purchased/their/share".

== See also ==
- Zayyanid dynasty
