= Zayyanid dynasty =

Berber Zenata dynasty that ruled the kingdom of Tlemcen

- Current region: Maghreb; northwestern Algeria
- Founded: 1235
- Founder: Yaghmurasen Ibn Zyan
- Final ruler: Al Hassan ibn Abu Muhammad II
- Titles: Sultan of Tlemcen
- Deposition: 1557

The Zayyanid dynasty or Ziyanids (Arabic: زيانيون, Ziyāniyyūn) or Abd al-Wadids (Arabic: بنو عبد الواد, Bānu ʿAbd āl-Wād) was a Berber Zenata dynasty that ruled the Kingdom of Tlemcen, mainly in modern Algeria centered on the town of Tlemcen in northwest Algeria. The Zayyanid dynasty's rule lasted from 1235 to 1557.

== History ==
On the collapse of the Almohad Caliphate's rule around 1236, the Kingdom of Tlemcen became independent under the rule of the Zayyanids, and Yaghmurasen Ibn Zyan. Ibn Zyan was able to maintain control over the rival Berber groups, and when faced with the outside threat of the Marinids, he formed an alliance with the Sultan of Granada and the King of Castile, Alfonso X.

After an eight-year siege of Tlemcen by the Marinids that ended in 1307, the reigns of Abu Hammu I (r. 1308–1318) and Abu Tashufin I (r. 1318–1337) marked a second political apogee of the Zayyanids with a consolidated hold over the central Maghreb. This period of strength was followed by a Marinid occupation of Tlemcen between 1337 and 1359 (with an interruption from 1348 to 1352). There were occasional Marinid attempts to retake Tlemcen up to 1370, but they found that they were unable to hold the region against local resistance. Under the long reign of Abu Hammu II (r. 1359–1389), the Zayyanid state enjoyed a third period of political strength.

In the 15th century, Zayyanid expansion eastward was attempted, but proved disastrous, as consequences of these incursions they were so weakened that over the following two centuries, the Zayyanid kingdom was intermittently a vassal of Hafsid Ifriqiya, Marinid Morocco, or Aragon. During the first half of the 16th century, Spain and the Ottoman Regency of Algiers fought over control of Tlemcen, with the Zayyanid sultans often installed as puppets of one side or the other. By 1551, the Ottomans had occupied Tlemcen and the last Zayyanid ruler, Hasan al-Abdallah, fled to Oran under Spanish protection and died a few years later, thus ending Zayyanid rule.

== List of rulers ==
Dates and most alternate names taken from John Stewart's African States and Rulers (1989).

No.	Name	Alternate Name	Reign Begin	Reign End	Notes
1	Yaghmurasen ibn Zyan	Abu Yahya I bin Zayyan	1236	March 1283	Founder
2	Abu Said Uthman I	Othmane Ibn Yaghmoracen	March 1283	6 June 1304	Son of Abu Yahya I
3	Abu Zayyan I	Abu Zayyar I Muhammad	6 June 1304	14 April 1308	Son of Abu Said Uthman I
4	Abu Hammu I	Abu Hamma I Musa	14 April 1308	22 July 1318	Brother of Abu Zayyan I Assassinated by his son Abu Tashufin I
5	Abu Tashufin I	Abu Tashufin I Abdal Rahman	22 July 1318	May 1336	Son of Abu Hammu I
First Marinid conquest (1337–1348) (Marinid ruler was Abu al-Hasan Ali)
6	Abu Said Uthman II	Abu Sa'id Uthman II Abdal Rahman	1348	1352	Son of Abu Tashufin I Co-ruler with Abu Thabid I
7	Abu Thabit I	Abu Thabit	1348	1352	Son of Abu Tashufin I Co-ruler with Abu Said Uthman II
Second Marinid conquest (1352–1359) (Marinid ruler was Abu Inan)
8	Abu Hammu II Musa	Abu Hammu II ibn Abi Yaqub	February 1359	20 May 1360	First Reign; Brother of Abu Said Uthman II
9	Abu Zayyan II	Abu Zayyan Muhammad II ibn Uthman	20 May 1360	1360	Ruled during times when Abu Hammu II was forced from power
-	Abu Hammu II	-	1360	1370	Second Reign; Expedition to Bugia defeated, 1366
-	Abu Zayyan II	-	1370	1372	Second Reign
-	Abu Hammu II	-	1372	1383	Third Reign
-	Abu Zayyan II	-	1383	1384	Third Reign
-	Abu Hammu II	-	1384	1387	Fourth Reign
-	Abu Zayyan II	-	1387	1387	Fourth and final Reign
-	Abu Hammu II	-	1387	1389	Fifth and final Reign
10	Abu Tashufin II	Abu Tashufin II Abdal Rahman	1389	29 May 1393	Son of Abu Hammu I
11	Abu Thabid II	Abu Thabit II Yusuf	29 May 1393	8 July 1393	Son of Abu Tashufin I
12	Abul Hadjdjadj I	Abu Hadjjaj Yusuf	8 July 1393	November 1393	Brother of Abu Thabid II
13	Abu Zayyan II	Abu Zayyan II Muhammad	November 1393	1397	Brother of Abul Hadjdjadj I
14	Abu Muhammad I	Abu Muhammad Abdallah I	1397	1400	Brother of Abu Zayyan II
15	Abu Abdallah I	Abu Abdallah Muhammad I	1400	1411	Brother of Abu Muhammad I
16	Abd al-Rahman I	Abd al-Rahman ibn Musa U	1411	1411	Son of Abu Muhammad I
17	Said I	Abu Sa'id ibn Musa	1411	November 1412	Brother of Abu Muhammad I
18	Abu Malek I	Abu Malek Abd al-Wahid	November 1412	May 1424	First reign Brother of Said I
19	Abu Abdallah II	Abu Abdallah Muhammad II	May 1424	1427	First reign Son of Abd al-Rahman I
Interregnum – Civil War (1427–1429)
-	Abu Malek I	-	1429	1430	Second reign
-	Abu Abdallah II	-	1430	1430	Second reign
20	Abu Abbas Ahmad I	Abu al-Abbas Ahmad I	1430	January 1462	Son of Abu Thabid II
21	Abu Abdallah III	Abu Abdallah Muhammad III	February 1462	1468	Son of Abu Abbas Ahmad I
22	Abu Tashufin III	-	1468	1468	Son of Abu Abdallah III
23	Abu Abdallah IV	Abu Abdallah Muhammad IV	1468	1504	Brother of Abu Tashufin III
24	Abu Abdallah V	Abu Abdallah Muhammad V	1504	1517	Son of Abu Abdallah IV
25	Abu Hammu III	Abu Hammu III Musa	1517	1527	Son of Abu Abbas Ahmad I
26	Abu Muhammad II	Abu Muhammad Abdallah II	1527	January 1541	Brother of Abu Hammu III
27	Abu Zayyan III	Abu Zayyan Ahmad	January 1541	7 March 1543	First Reign; Son of Abu Muhammad II
28	Abu Abdallah VI	Abu Abdallah Muhammad VI	7 March 1543	June 1543	Brother of Abu Zayyan III
-	Abu Zayyan III	-	June 1543	1550	Second Reign
29	Al Hassan ibn Abu Muhammad II	-	1550	1557	Brother of Abu Zayyan III

== See also ==
- Aftasid dynasty
- Wattasid dynasty
- List of Sunni Muslim dynasties
- History of Algeria
