= Zayyanid architecture =

Period of architecture in North Africa

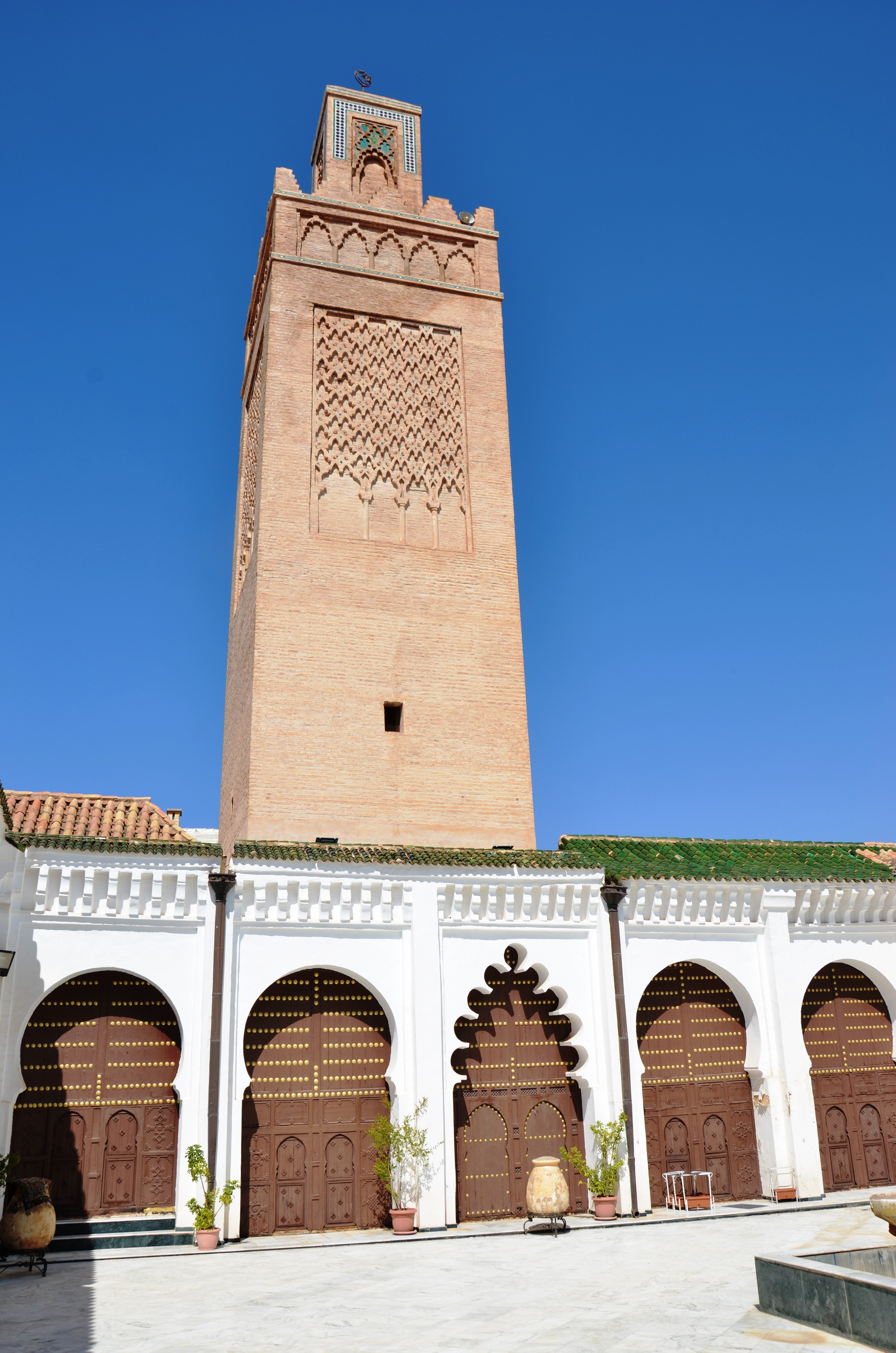
The minaret, and possibly the courtyard, of the Great Mosque of Tlemcen date from the time of the first Zayyanid sultan, Yaghmurasen, c. 1236

Zayyanid architecture originated in the Kingdom of Tlemcen between the 13th and 16th centuries in the northwestern region of present-day Algeria. It is a continuation of the western Islamic architectural traditions, often known as the "Hispano-Moresque style," with elements that were further developed to create distinctive designs lasting for centuries. This architectural style was significantly influenced by the Almohad Caliphate and Andalusian architecture, resulting in a lasting heritage of Moorish architectural achievements.

== Historical background ==
After the Battle of Las Navas de Tolosa, the Islamic Maghreb witnessed the emergence of three major dynasties starting from the 13th century: the Hafsid dynasty in Ifriqiya, the Zayyanid dynasty in central Maghreb, and the Marinid dynasty in western Maghreb. This division was an inevitable result of the tense political situation in the region at that time, which led to conflicts and wars. As the Almohad state weakened, each of these dynasties sought to establish its rule and define its borders at the expense of the others.

When the prince Yaghmurasen Ibn Zyan declared his independence from Almohad rule in 1235, he aimed to solidify the state's entity and establish its foundations. He designated the city of Tlemcen as the political capital of the Beni Abd al-Wad dynasty, the base of the Central Maghreb, and a center of cultural influence in the Islamic Maghreb during the Middle Ages. Tlemcen played a significant role across various domains, especially in trading, Tlemcen emerged as the primary trading hub, surpassing Tiaret in the region. It housed European trading centers that facilitated connections between African and European merchants. Tlemcen played a vital role in the trade of African gold, which reached European hands through this pivotal city. The Zayyanid dynasty experienced remarkable development and prosperity in the field of urbanism. Despite periods of political and social unrest in Tlemcen under Zayyanid rule, religious, civic, and military buildings witnessed notable activity. Additionally, a large number of scholars emerged, Leaving behind an impact on the fields of science and architecture in the region. As a result, the city of Tlemcen, the capital of the Zayyanids, was also considered one of the most well-policed and civilized cities in the world.

== Mosque architecture ==
The Abd al-Wadids had expertise in Islamic architecture, leaving behind them structures characterized by their distinct incorporation of local zellij and ceramic decorations. One example is the Mosque of Sidi Bel Hassan. Considered as one of the well preserved structures from the Zayyanid architecture, it was adorned with exquisite decorative and artistic elements. The mosques of Ouled Al-Imam and Sidi Ibrahim are two other examples. The Zayyanids erected minarets for already-standing mosques, such as the minaret of Agadir Mosque, the minaret of Algiers Mosque, and the two minarets of the Grand Mosque in Tlemcen and Nedroma.

=== Minaret ===
The Zayyanids left various minarets across their kingdom that have been preserved up to the present day, with a great part of them being built in their capital Tlemcen. These minarets are square-shaped and typically consist of two floors.

These minarets can be traced back to the Zayyanid period in central Maghreb. Among them are eight minarets, including the minaret of Sidi Abu Al-Hasan Mosque, the minaret of Sidi Ibrahim Mosque, the minaret of the Great Mosque of Tlemcen, the minaret of the Nador Mosque, the minaret of Agadir, the minaret of Ouled El-Imam Mosque, the minaret of the Great Mosque of Algiers, and the minaret of the Mustur Mosque.

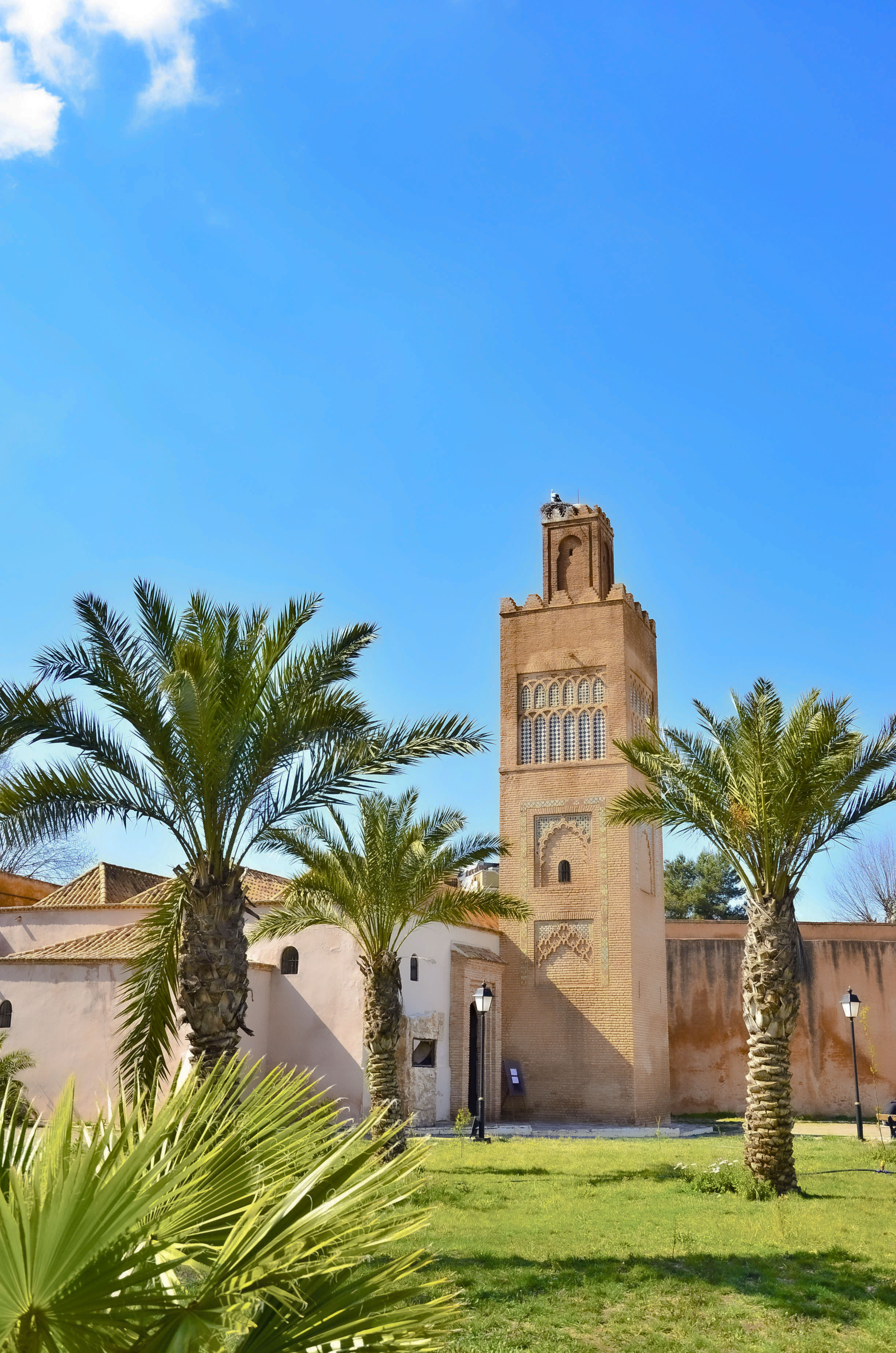
El Mechouar Mosque Minaret, achieved by the sultan Abu Hammu I in 1317.

Zayyanid minarets are characterized by their square shape and their placement at the corners of the back wall of the mosque, except for the mosques of Tlemcen and Algiers, where the minaret is positioned at the center of the back wall, aligned with the mihrab. They are also notable for their moderate height, which is proportional to the size of the mosque, whether large or small.

The Zayyanid minarets, both in their general exterior appearance and decorative elements, were influenced by the Almohad minarets. Evidence of this influence is the fact that Zayyanid minarets have two floors instead of three.

As for the internal structure of the minaret, it bears a striking resemblance to the minaret of the Qalat Bani Hammad Mosque.

=== Outside appearance ===
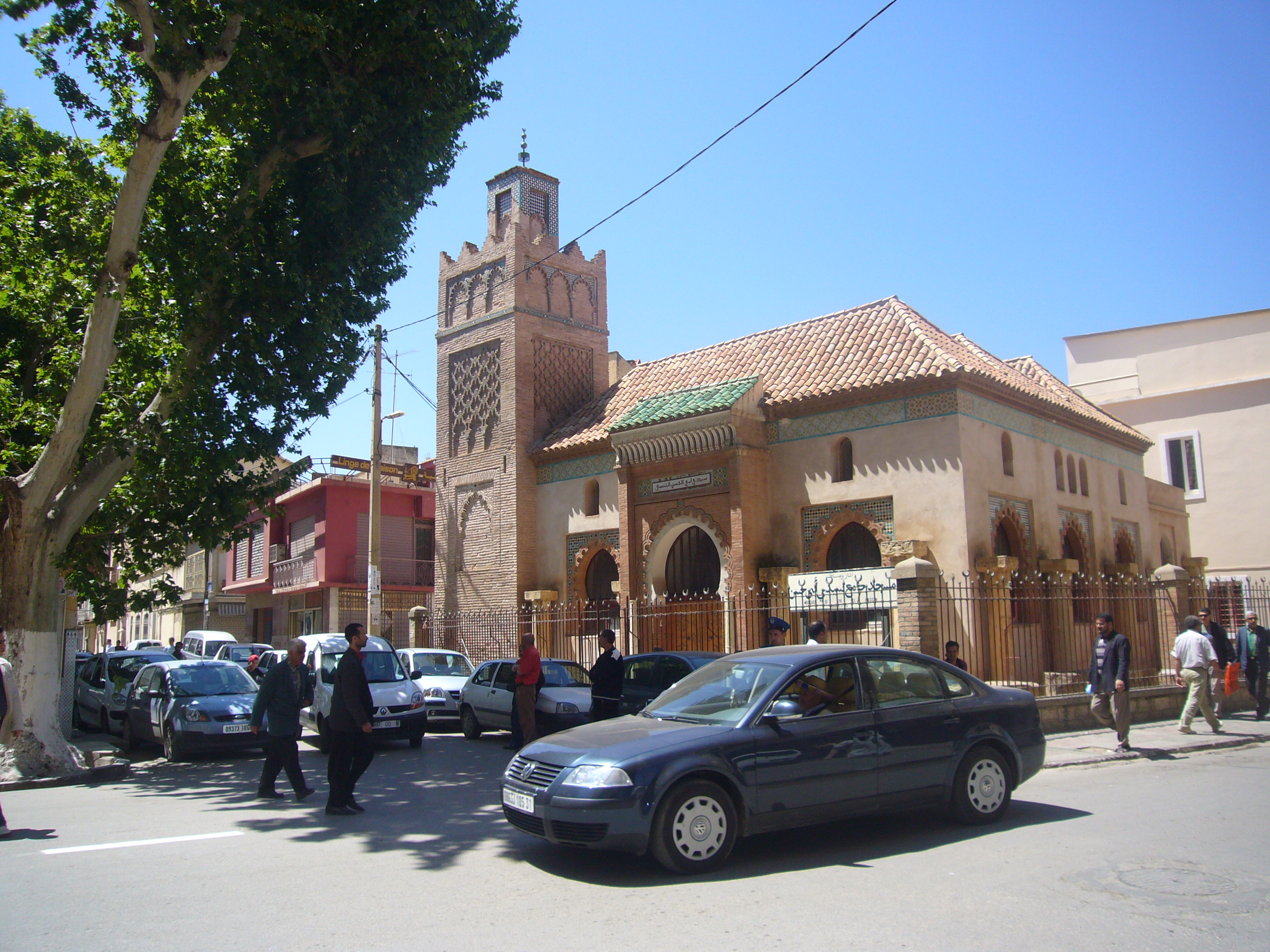
Sidi Belahcen Mosque Tlemcen, constructed by the Zayyanid sultan Abu Said Uthman I

Mosques during the Abd al-Wadids realm adopted a rectangular architectural form, oriented from north to south in Sidi Bel Hassan and Sidi Ibrahim mosques, and from east to west in the Ouled El Imam mosque. Most of the minaret occupies one of the corners of the rectangle, for example, the southeast corner in the Sidi Bel Hassan Mosque, the northwest corner in the Sidi Ibrahim Mosque, and the northeast corner in the Ouled El Imam Mosque.

As for the entrances, their shape, position, and number vary from one mosque to another. The main entrance of Sidi Bel Hassan Mosque is located in the middle of the eastern wall and is a prominent commemorative entrance. The second entrance opens on the southwest side and is a simple and ordinary entrance resembling the three entrances of Ouled El Imam mosque, one on the eastern wall and the other two on the northern wall overlooking the shared courtyard with the madrasa, historically.

Sidi Ibrahim mosque includes three prominent commemorative entrances occupying the three sides of the mosque except for the southeast side. They are organized in a balanced and coordinated manner.

The roofs of the three mosques appear from the outside in a sloping or truncated pyramid shape. This roofing style is suited to the region's climate, as it helps rainwater to drain and slide off during winter and provides cooling inside the mosque during summer. The roofs appear to be covered with solid, shiny, green-colored tiles, and they run vertically along the qibla wall in Sidi Bel Hassan and Ouled El Imam mosques, and in parallel in Sidi Ibrahim Mosque, where its dome in front of the mihrab is slightly prominent outward with small windows for lighting and ventilation, some of which are open, and others are closed. Additional windows for lighting and ventilation are opened in the walls of the three mosques.

=== Interior appearance ===
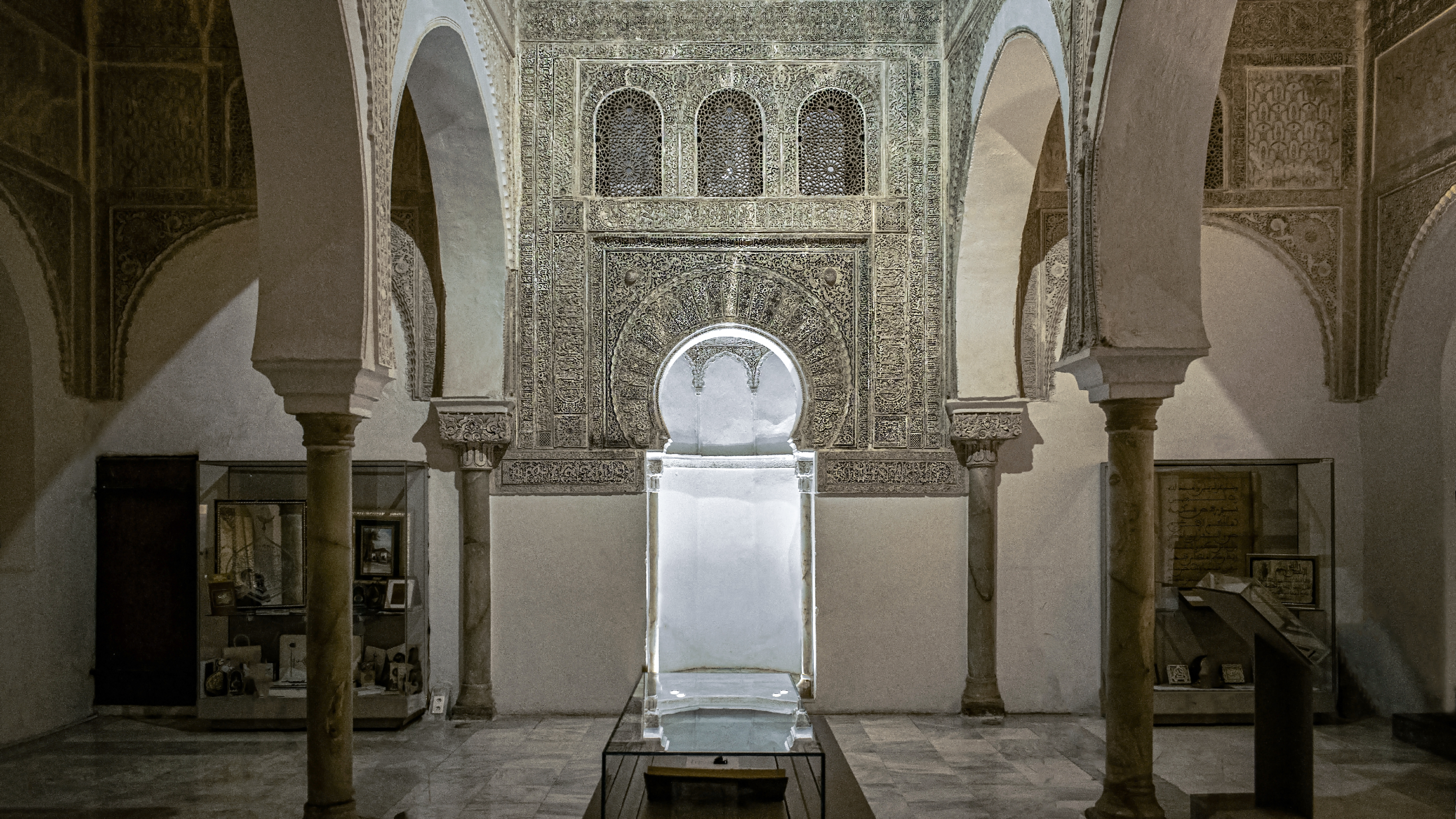
Mihrab of the Sidi Bel Hassan Mosque

The Zayyanid mosques did preserve their architectural foundation, except for the El-Mechouar Mosque, which underwent a complete change in its architectural form, retaining only its minaret as an original element. In reality, the Zayyanid mosques are small in size compared to the previous Almoravid mosques in Tlemcen, which confirms their secondary function as evident from their general dimensions. For instance, Sidi Bel Hassan Mosque measures approximately 10.20 meters in length and 9.70 meters in width, and is characterized by the absence of a courtyard. While Ouled El Imam mosque measures about 9 meters in length and 6.30 meters in width. Sidi Ibrahim mosque is considered the largest and most spacious, with the prayer hall measuring approximately 19 meters in length and 15.40 meters in width.

Each mosque features a small door that leads to the minaret. The entrances of Sidi Bel Hassan and Ouled El Imam mosques directly connect to the prayer hall, while two of the entrances in Sidi Ibrahim mosque lead to the rear of the prayer hall and one leads to an open central courtyard.

== Palaces ==
Palace construction was widespread throughout the Zayyanid era across the kingdom. Sultans of the Zayyanid dynasty showed great interest in building and construction. Among the important architectural structures established during the Zayyanid era were the palaces, including the Palace of El Mechouar.

Yaghmurasen had a keen interest in building and construction, and he passed this passion on to his son Uthman and his grandson Abu Hammu I in establishing both religious and urban architectural structures. Historical records attest that sultan Abu Hammu I built a palace near the town of Mazouna when he conquered it in 1311. His son Abu Tashufin I (1318-1337 CE) was also interested about construction, making his era a period of urban prosperity in Tlemcen. The number of houses and mansions in his time reached around sixteen. He was particularly fond of building palaces, and among his palaces were three famous ones: Dar Al-Malik, Dar Al-Surur, and the palace of Abu Fehr in El Mechouar complexe. However, we do not know their exact locations as they were destroyed by the Marinids when Abu al-Abbas Ahmed attacked Tlemcen in 1387.

=== El Mechouar ===
It is the royal palace and the main headquarters of the sultans of the Zayyanid dynasty. It was built by Yaghmurasen ibn Zyan and later expanded by Abu Hamu Musa I, who added some facilities to it. One of the most important historical texts that mentioned the palace of El Mechouar is the precise description given by the traveler Hassan Al-Wazzan, who said, "The royal palace of El Mechouar is located south of the city and is surrounded by high walls in the form of a fortress. It contains other small palaces with gardens and orchards, all of them well-built and adorned with beautiful architectural decorations. The palace has two gates, one opening towards the open country and the other in the middle of the city where the chief of the guard resides."

The palace walls showed rich decorations, enhanced with zellij and intricately carved stucco. Additionally, the artistry of Islamic calligraphy decorated this structure. The remains of one of the palaces stood out to present-day archaeologists with its central alcove in the grand audience hall. Inspired by earlier Zirid palaces, this feature set it apart from contemporary palace designs in other regions. In 2010–2011 a modern reconstruction was erected over these remains, which has an unclear relation with the design of the original palace.

Within the palatial complex, an array of residences, pavilions, and gardens surrounded the landscape, complemented by essential facilities like a mosque and a hammam.

During the Zayyanid era, four prominent palaces emerged: Dar al-Malik (Arabic: دال الملك), Dar Abu Fahr (Arabic: دار ابي فهر), Dar al-Surur (Arabic: دار السرور), and Dar al-Raha (Arabic: دار الراحة).Abu Tashufin I, during his reign from 1318 to 1337, was the visionary behind the construction of three of these palaces.

The architects designed some of these palaces to cater to different seasons. The summer residence, crafted from mudbrick, preserved a refreshing coolness, while the winter residence, crafted from stone, provided warmth during the colder months.

It is noteworthy that the palace of El Mechouar stands as a remarkable landmark of the Kingdom of Tlemcen, showcasing the Zayyanid art and architecture with evident influence from the Andalusian style.

== Fortifications ==
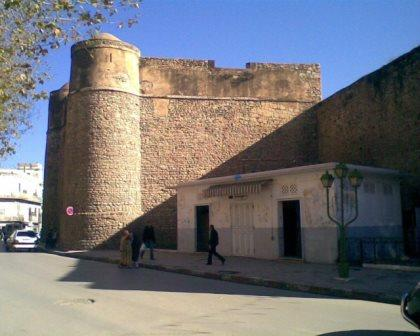
El Mechouar defensive fortress.

During their reign, the Zayyanids took significant measures to fortify several cities in the Maghreb al Awsat, including Honaine, Nedroma, Ténès, and their capital, Tlemcen. As an example, Algiers was encompassed by imposing and grand walls under the command of Sultan Abu Tashufin I. While most of their efforts were concentrated in Tlemcen due to frequent raids by the Marinids, surrounding their capital with a deep trench that encircled the city, reinforced with towering walls built from clay, sand, and limestone.

The political and military circumstances faced by the Zayyanid state, along with developments among neighboring Marinids and Hafsids, prompted them to focus on establishing diverse military fortifications that catered to the prevailing political and military conditions and solidified their position. Consequently, these military fortifications became a stronghold for the region.

In the mid-13th century, Tlemcen was established by merging two ancient cities, Tagrart and Agadir, into a single unified city under the rule of Sultan Yaghmurasen. Under his rule, Tlemcen was transformed into a unified city protected by high walls, consisting of approximately seven layers in some areas. Yaghmoracen also initiated the construction of the imposing Kachout walls in 1265. A Moroccan traveler described these walls as "the strongest and most solid walls", attesting to their height and invincibility.

The Zayyanid sultans also constructed numerous fortresses, castles, and towers, and other fortifications. In Tlemcen, they built tower defenses in order to strengthen their capital, among them the El Machouar Fort and Castle, and El Kalaa Fort. The construction of these structures was intensified during the siege of Bejaia and other attacks on the Hafsids, such as the Temzezdekt that was supplied by three thousand soldiers. Abu Tachufin also built more fortifications on the eastern side of the kingdom to strengthen his position in that area, including Bakr and Yaqut Fort.

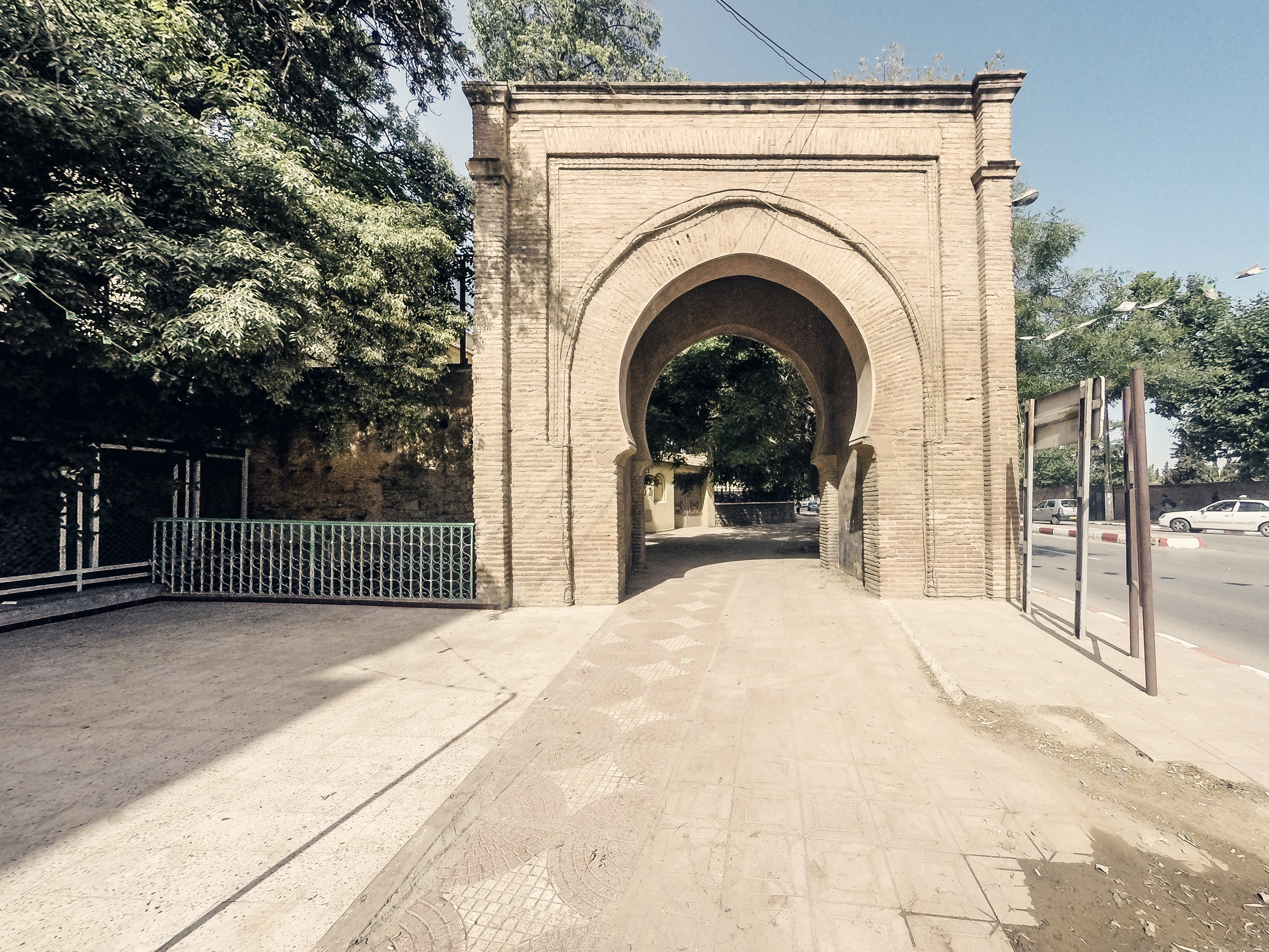
Bab el Khemis, one of the old gates of Tlemcen.

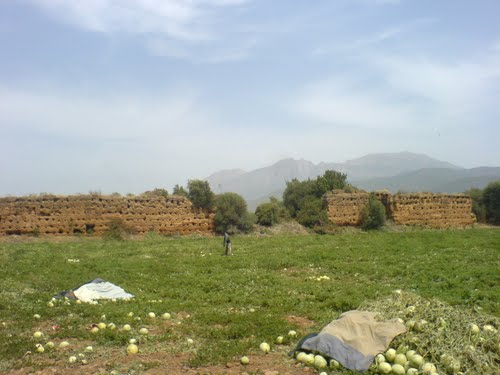
Remnants of the Zianide fortress of Timzizdekt.

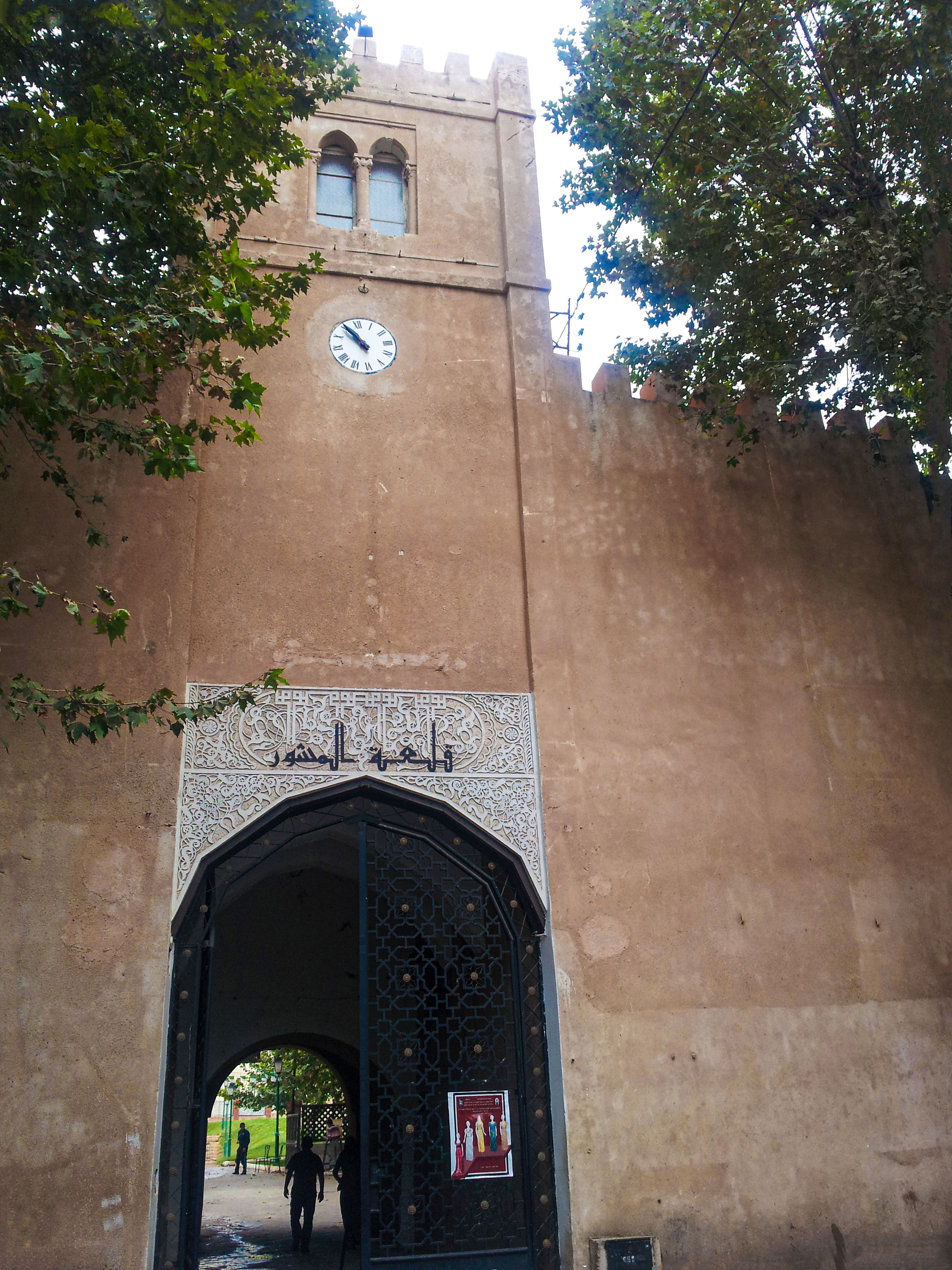
Modern image of El Mechouar entrance.

== Other constructions ==
=== Madrasas ===
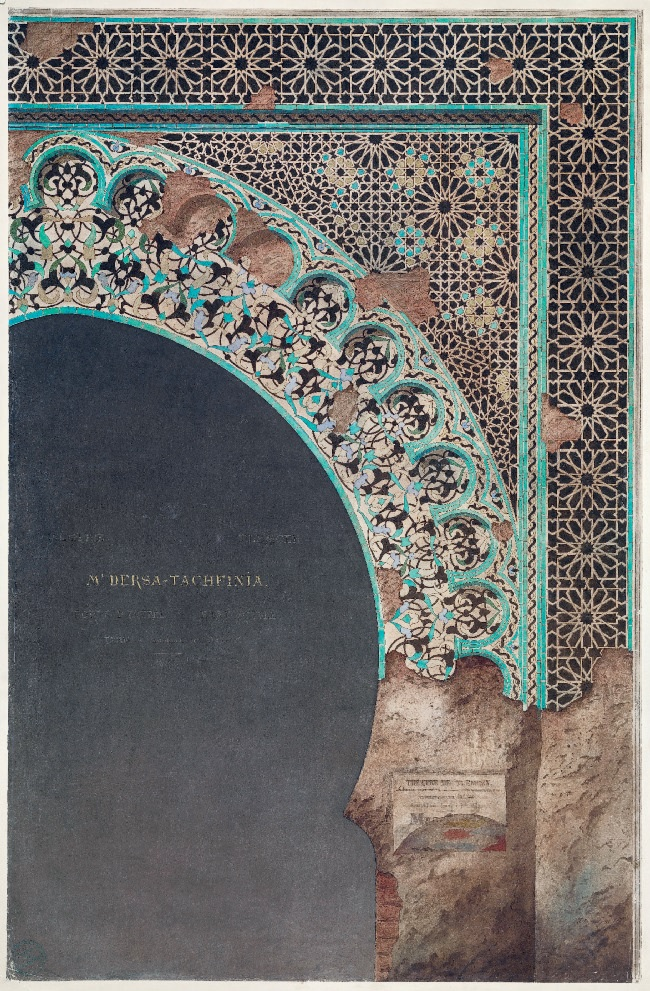
Zellij fragments of the decoration on the entrance portal from the Tashfiniya Madrasa.

The Zayyanid dynasty were the first rulers to build madrasas in the territory controlled by the Kingdom of Tlemcen in central Maghreb, same as their neighbouring dynasties, the Hafsids and the Marinids, introduced the first madrasas to the eastern and western Maghreb. The first madrasa was built in 1310 in Tlemcen by Abu Hammu I and was called "al-Madrasa al-Qadima" or "Old Madrasa" (now madrasa Ouled El Imam).

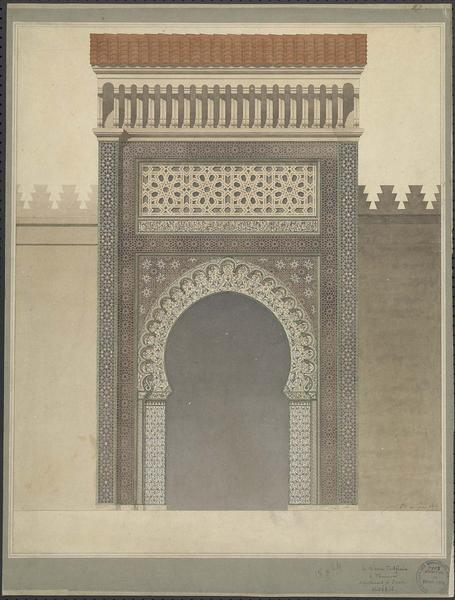
Reconstruction of the madrasa's entrance portal in the 19th century, before its demolition.

The Abd al-Wadid rulers showed great interest in building madrasas, aiming to revive the Maliki school of thought and uproot the roots of the Almohad school. Moreover, the establishment of schools aimed to spread education and culture in Tlemcen, as well as guide the subjects. It also marked the advancement of scientific and cultural life. Madrasas in the kingdom featured a library for the students' benefit, along with a private wing to accommodate both students and travelers. Financial support for these institutions came from both the central power and affluent merchants and scholars.

Schools spread widely in the city of Tlemcen during the Zayyanid era and served as a refuge for students of knowledge. The traveler Al-Hassan Al-Wazzan referred to these madrasas, stating, "There are many excellent mosques in the city of Tlemcen, with imams and preachers, and five well-built, adorned schools." Ibn Al-Ahmar also mentioned these madrasas, indicating that the number of schools established in the city of Tlemcen during the Zayyanid dynasty amounted to five major schools.

The most notable examples of Zayyanid schools is the Tashfiniya Madrasa (now demolished) built by Abu Tashufin I in the early 14th century, which was the second Madrasa and great monument of the city of Tlemcen. The most prominent characteristic of the madrasa's ornamentation was its utilization of vibrant zellij tilework, adorning numerous facets of the edifice. This exquisite style involved skillfully assembling tile pieces of various hues, such as turquoise, light blue, black, and white, into intricate mosaics, resulting in elaborate arabesque and geometric motifs. This made it truly the largest school in the Central Maghreb at that time, and it continued to fulfill its scholarly mission until the end of the 16th century. Among its renowned teachers was the Maliki scholar Abu Musa Al-Mushaddali, who was among the leading scholars.

=== Civic work ===
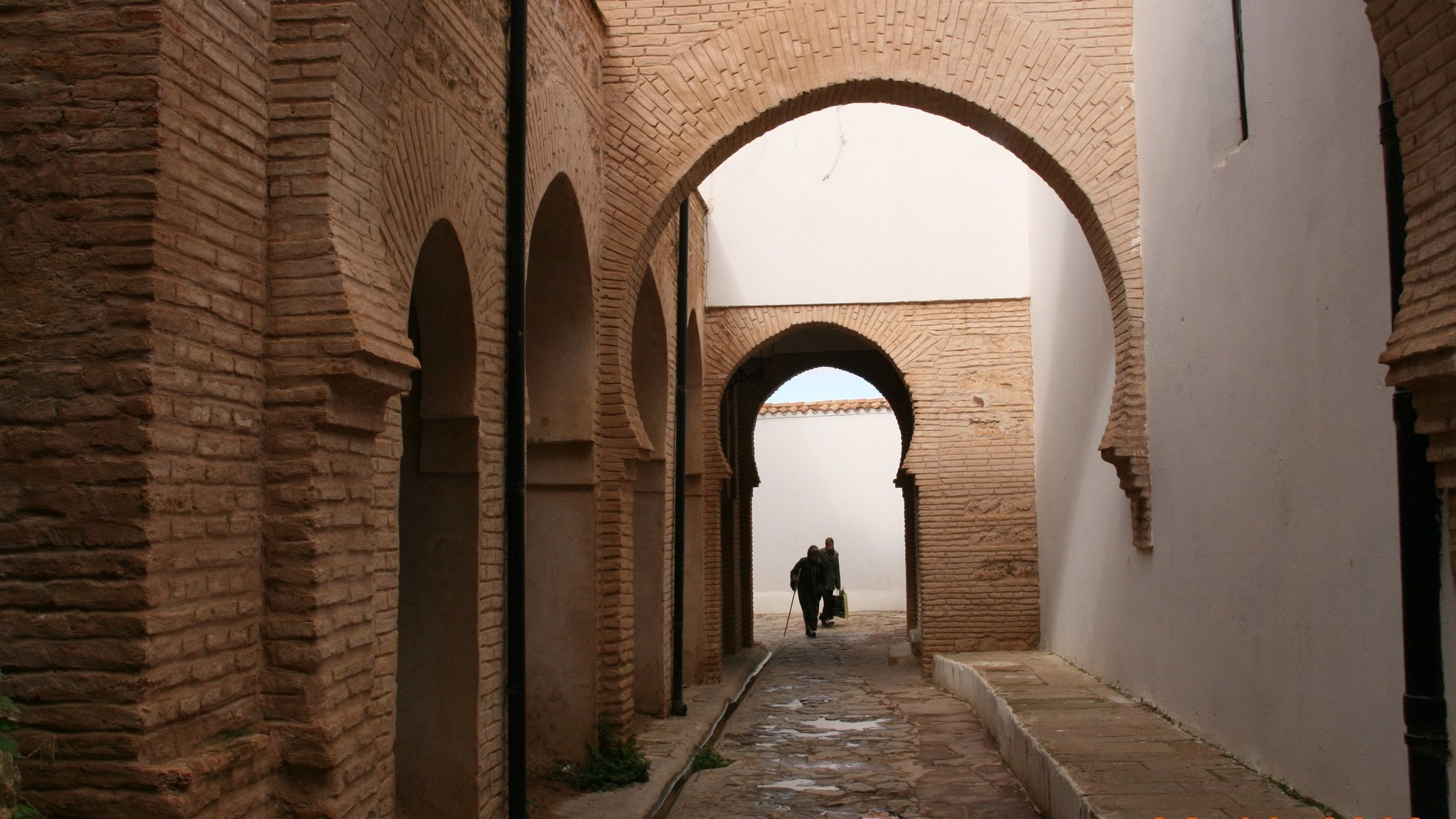
Historical corridor of El Ubbad in Tlemcen, dating back to the Zayyanid era.

During the Zayyanid rule in Tlemcen, a remarkable number of civic infrastructure and buildings were constructed, serving various purposes. Historical texts highlight the presence of numerous hammams scattered across the city. One Moroccan traveler attested the cleanliness found in Hammam Al-A'la, which gained widespread renown. Additionally, the Zayyanids built several Fonduqs (lodging places) to accommodate European traders in Tlemcen as well as the city of Oran. Hassan al-Wazzan, a traveler of the time, noted the existence of funduqs with imposing walls during his journey to the city. In Tlemcen, given the city's significant trading importance, Sultan Abu Hammu I allocated substantial areas on the north and south sides for these funduqs. Some civil structures from the Zayyanid era still stand today, such as the bridge of Safsaf and the grand Basin of Tlemcen, built under the reign of Abu Tashufin I, which was used for distributing to the fields and houses during times of drought and to withstand sieges during times of war.

== Decoration ==
=== Geometric patterns ===
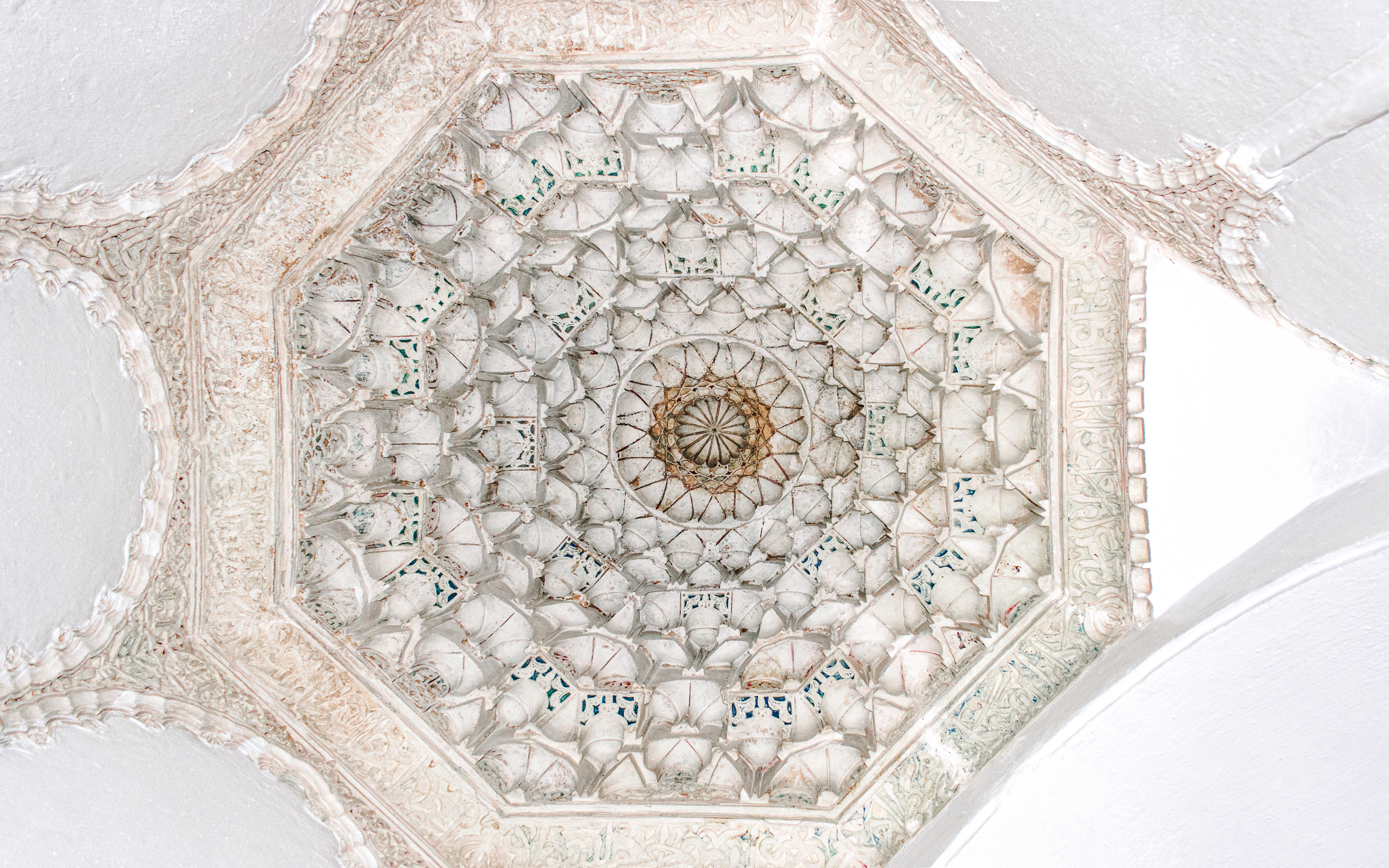
Muqarnas inside the mihrab of Sidi Bel Hassan Mosque

One of the prominent geometric patterns in Zayyanid constructions can be observed in the Sidi Bel Hassan Mosque which incorporated geometric shapes that converged with floral and calligraphic elements. Examples include geometric friezes containing shapes from both ornamentations. Some geometric motifs, however, stood alone without additional embellishments, a rarity in Zayyanid architecture, such as the star-shaped polygons. Other geometric forms intersected to create squares or polygons, often serving as a framework for calligraphic ornamentation, especially on the mihrab facade. Similar patterns were applied to the minaret, adorned with geometric shapes in zellij tiles. Crossing motifs, featuring smaller intersections within them, formed the structure, a design also present in the minaret of the Mosque of Ouled El Imam. In addition, various other constructions featured geometric patterns manifested through zellij displayed in squares, polygon's stars and derivatives with multiple colors. Additionally, star shaped polygons and gypsum decorations including ceramic lattice work are also attested among Zayyanid decoration.

=== Floral and vegetal motifs ===
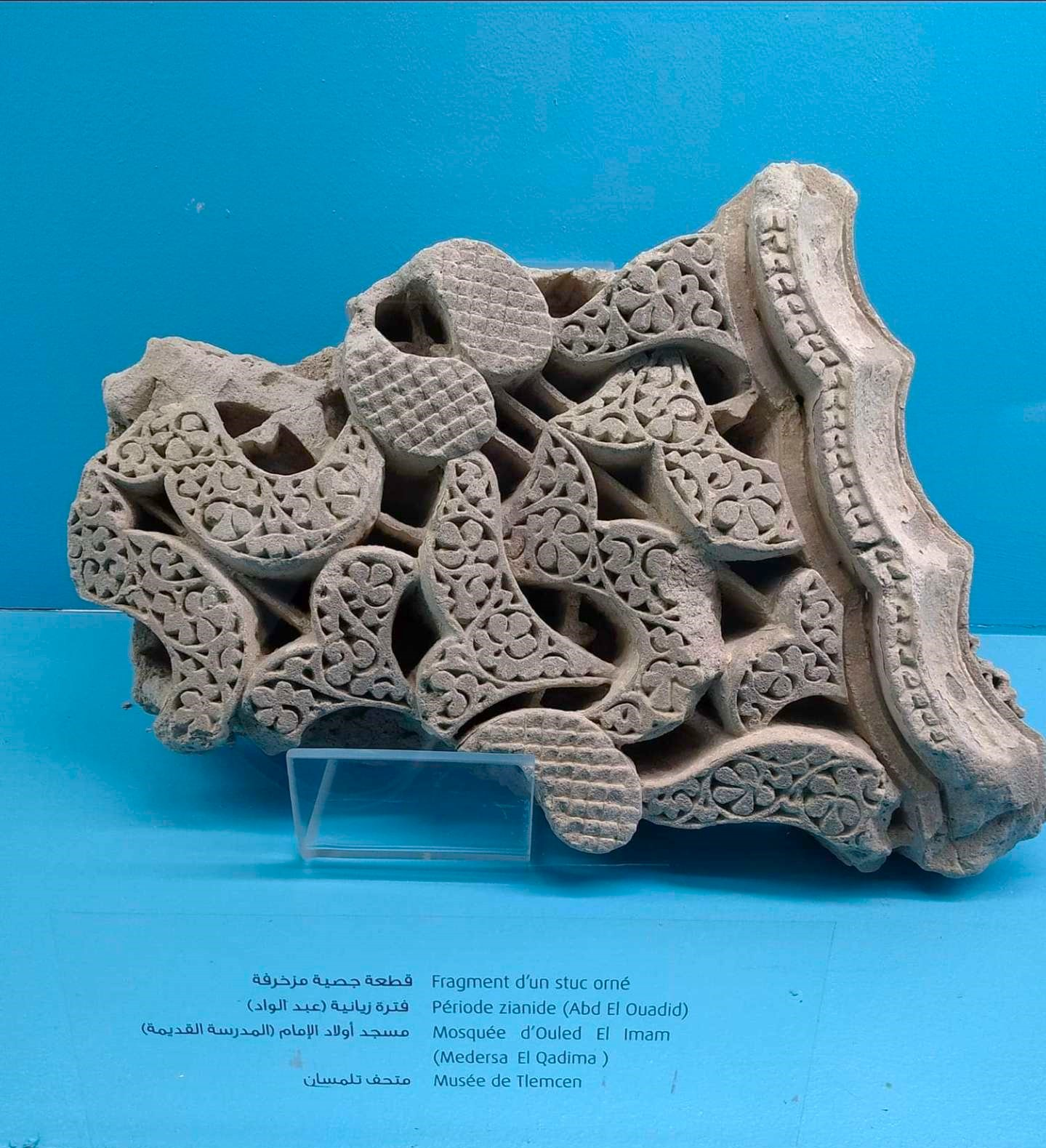
An arabesque decorative piece from the Zayyanid madrasa of Ouled El Imam, currently housed in the Museum of Tlemcen.

The vegetal and floral ornamentation received significant attention during the Zayyanid period. This is reflected in the diversity of elements employed in various structures, including the Sidi Bel Hassan Mosque. Among these motifs are Palmettes in their various forms, whether simple, double, or triple, in addition to helical and curved stems, and three-lobed leaves, as well as quadrifoliate, along with grapevine that were also present in the decorations of the Almoravid craftsmen. All of the Zayyanid structures share the same ornamentation style with only minor variations. For example, the mosque of Oulad Al-Imam featured vegetal adornments represented by simple palmettes incorporating pentagonal leaves. Among the components of this botanical embellishment is the "maharra", from which palm fronds branch out. This element is also recurrent in the design of the mosque of Sidi Ibrahim.

=== Calligraphic Ornaments ===
Islamic calligraphy were also in use in coordination with the other geometric and vegetal Ornaments, it forms in the Naskh script that covers most of the marginal notes in various writings, many of which are Quranic verses, it was the most used script during the Zayyanid period in opposite of the almoravids that were more in use of Kufic script. Kufic script was also present in the mihrab of Sidi Bel Hassan Mosque and Sidi ibrahim complex. It was also used in capitals and for commemorative plaques, and prominently appeared in mosques such as Sidi Ibrahim, as well as minarets like those of the Great Mosque of Nedroma and the El Mechouar Mosque minaret.

== Sources ==
- Abun-Nasr, Jamil (1987). A history of the Maghrib in the Islamic period. Cambridge University Press. ISBN 052133767-4.
- al-Abdari, Abu Abdullah Muhammad bin Muhammad (1968). الرحلة المغربية [Moroccan journey] (in Arabic). Mohammed V University. p. 11.
- al-Jazairi, Ibn al-Annabi (2018). السعي المحمود في نظام الجنود [Praiseworthy pursuit in the soldiers' system] (in Arabic). Dār al-Waʻy. p. 130. ISBN 978-993137632-3.
- Arnold, Felix (2017). Islamic Palace Architecture in the Western Mediterranean: A History. Oxford University Press. pp. 223–224. ISBN 978-019062455-2.
- azzoug, abdelkrim (2006). Kitab Tatawer Al-maadine fi Al-djazair كتاب تطور المآذن في الجزائر [Book on the development of minarets in Algeria] (in Arabic). Cairo: Maktabat Zahra El-Shark. p. 52 – via Internet Archive.
- Bel, A. (1993). "'Abdalwadides". First Encyclopaedia of Islam: 1913-1936. BRILL. p. 65. ISBN 978-90-04-09796-4.
- Bloom, Jonathan; Blair, Sheila, eds. (2009). "Architecture". Grove Encyclopedia of Islamic Art and Architecture. Oxford University Press. pp. 155, 158. ISBN 978-019530991-1.
- Bloom, Jonathan M. (2020). Architecture of the Islamic West: North Africa and the Iberian Peninsula, 700–1800. Yale University Press. p. 187. ISBN 978-030021870-1.
- Bourouiba, Rachid (1969). L'Art religieux musulman en Algérie du XIè au XIVè siècle [Islamica religious art in Algeria from the 11th to the 14th century] (in French). University of Aix-en-Provence. p. 186.
- Brunschvig, Robert (1940). La Berbérie Orientale sous les Hafsides, des origines à la fin du XVe siècle [The Eastern Barbary Coast under the Hafsids, from their origins to the end of the 15th century] (D.Litt. thesis) (in French). Algiers: University of Algiers.
- Charpentier, Agnès (2018). Tlemcen médiévale: urbanisme, architecture et arts (in French). Éditions de Boccard. ISBN 978-270180525-2.
- El-Tenessy (1830). History of Beni Zeiyan (in Arabic). National Foundation for Typographic Arts, Algeria. p. 141 – via Internet Archive.
- Filali, Abdelaziz (2002). تلمسان في العهد الزياني [Tlemcen during the Zayyanid Era: A Political, Architectural, Social, and Cultural Study]. Algeria: National Foundation for Typographic Arts. p. 116 – via Internet Archive.
- Hadjiat, Abdelhamid (1974). Kitab Abou Hamou Moussa al-Zayani. Algeria: National Company for Publishing and Distribution. p. 60 – via Internet Archive.
- Hamma, Walid; Djedid, Abdelkader; Ouissi, Mohammed Nabil (Summer 2016). "Délimitation du patrimoine urbain de la ville historique de Tlemcen en Algérie" [Delimitation of the urban legacy of the historical city of Tlemcen in Algeria] (PDF). Cinq Continents (in French). 6 (13): 42–60.
- Iles, Sidi Mohammed; Hamma, Walid (2019). "The Zianides mosques in Tlemcen: An architectural study" (PDF). International Journal of Human Settlements (in French). 3 (2). Archived from the original on 14 July 2020.
- Ismail, Ibn al-Ahmar (2001). The History of the Zayyanid State in Tlemcen (in Arabic). The Library of Religious Culture, Egypt – via Internet Archive.
- Julien, Charles-André (1994). Histoire de l'Afrique du Nord [History of North Africa] (in French). Paris: Édition Payot. ISBN 978-2-228-88789-2.
- Khaldūn, Yaḥyá ibn Muḥammad Ibn; Bel, Alfred (1913). Bughyat al-ruwwād fī dhikr al-mulūk min Banī ʻAbd al-Wād (in French and Arabic). Imprimerie Orientale Pierre Fontana. p. 129.
- Lafer, Ali. "Mosque and minaret of the Mechouar (citadel)". Discover Islamic Art – Museum With No Frontiers.
- Lafer, Ali (2023). "Sidi Ibrahim Mosque". Translated by Maria Vlotides. Museum With No Frontiers.
- Laraj, Abdel Aziz (15 December 1991). المساجد الزيانية بتلمسان "عمارتها وخصائصها" [The Zayaniyya Mosques in Tlemcen, "its architecture and characteristics"]. Annales de l'Université d'Alger (in Arabic). 6 (1): 101–125.
- Léon African, Jean (1526). Histoire et Description de l'Afrique [History and Description of Africa] (in French). Paris: E. Leroux. p. 20 – via Gallica.
- Marçais, Georges (1954). L'architecture musulmane d'Occident [Eastern Islamic Architecture] (in French). Paris: Arts et métiers graphiques. pp. 284–285.
- Milli, Mubarak bin Mohammed (2004). تاريخ الجزائر في القديم والحديث [The history of Algeria, ancient and modern] (in Arabic). Algerian Renaissance Library (مكتبة النهضة الجزائرية،). p. 486. ISBN 996192026-0.
- "Mosque and minaret of al-Méchouar (al-Mishwār)". Qantara: Mediterranean Heritage.
- Niane, Djibril Tamsir (1984). Africa from the Twelfth to the Sixteenth Century: 4. University of California Press. p. 93. ISBN 978-0-435-94810-8.
- Nuqadi, Sayid Muhammad (31 December 2012). التهيئة العمرانية بمدينة تلمسان من المرابطين إلى بداية الاحتلال الفرنسي: دراسة ميدانية [Urban development in the city of Tlemcen from the Almoravids to the beginning of the French occupation: a field study]. Ideas and prospects (أفكار وآفاق) (in Arabic). 2 (3): 167–178.
- Piesse, Louis (1862). Itinéraire historique et descriptif de l'Algérie: comprenant le Tell et le Sahara [Historical and descriptive itinerary of Algeria: including the Tell and the Sahara] (in French). Hachette. p. 239.
- Ricard, Prosper (1924). Pour comprendre l'art musulman dans l'Afrique du Nord et en Espagne [Understanding Muslim art in North Africa and Spain] (in French). Hachette. p. 225.
- Ruano, Delfina S. (2006). "Hafsids". In Meri, Josef W (ed.). Medieval Islamic Civilization: an Encyclopedia. Routledge. ISBN 0-415-96691-4.
- Shaw, Thomas (1830). Voyage dans la régence d'Alger (in French). Marlin. p. 242 – via Internet Archive.
- Talbi, M. (1997). "The Spread of Civilization in the Maghrib and its Impact on Western Civilization". In Ki-Zerbo, Joseph; Niane, Djibril T (eds.). General History of Africa, vol. IV: Africa from the Twelfth to the Sixteenth Century. UNESCO, James Curry Ltd., and Univ. Calif. Press. ISBN 0-85255-094-4.
- de la Véronne, Chantal (2002). Yaghmurasan: premier souverain de la dynastie berbère des Abd-Al-Wadides de Tlemcen, 633/1236-681/1283 (in French). Bouchène. p. 48. ISBN 978-291294629-4.
- Y.B. (2008). "The Abdelwâdides". Qantara: Mediterranean Heritage.
- ""قلعة المشور".. معلمٌ تاريخيٌّ يروي فصولا من حكم ملوك تلمسان" [Al-Mashwar Castle: a historical landmark that narrates chapters from the rule of the Tlemcen kings]. Al-Watan (in Arabic). Archived from the original on 4 May 2023.
