= Sidi Belahcen Mosque =

Former mosque, now museum, in Tlemcen, Algeria

Sidi Bellahsen Mosque
- مسجد سيدي بلحسن
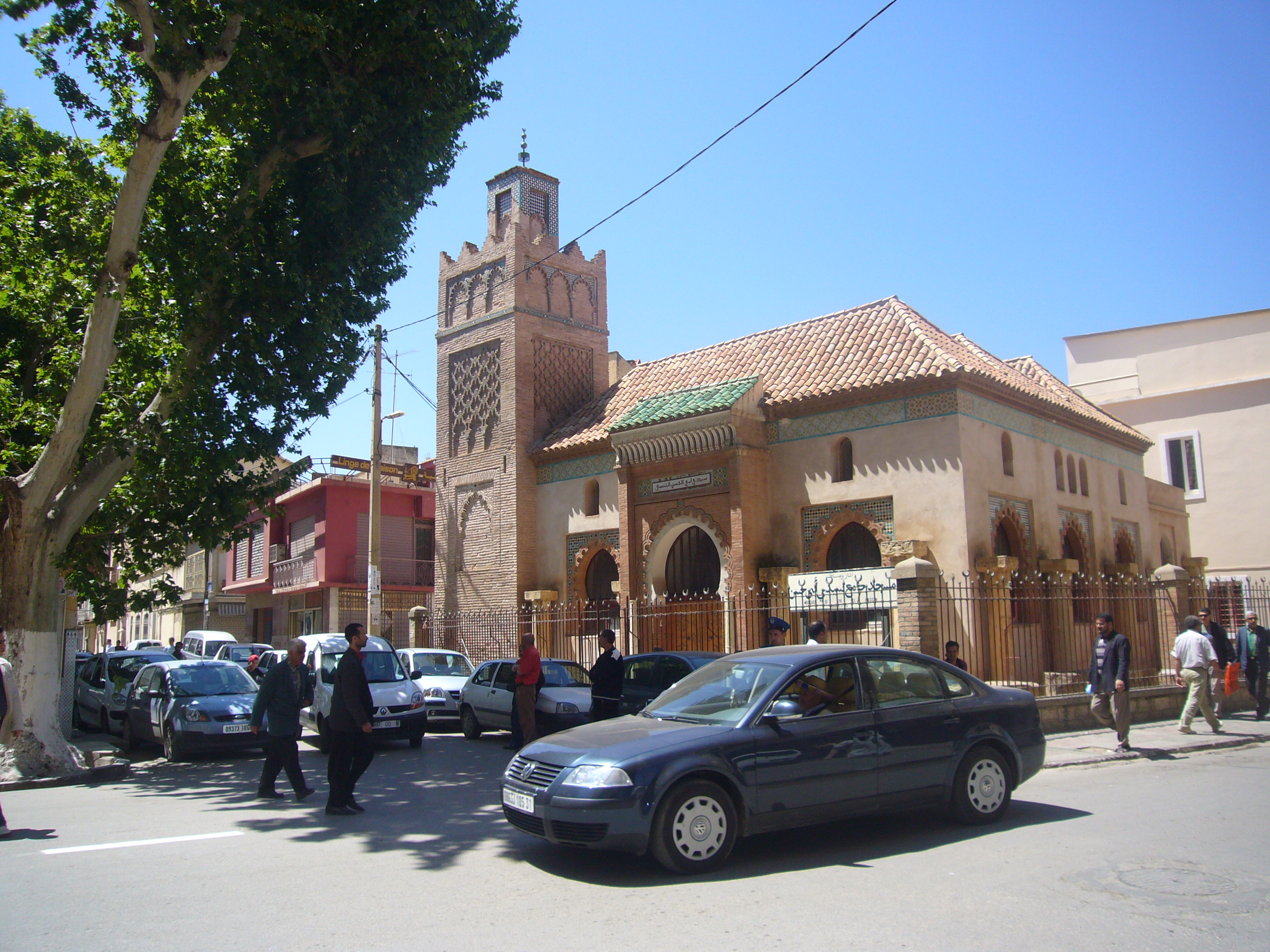

Religion
- Affiliation: Islam
- Ecclesiastical or organizational status: Mosque (former)
- Status: Inactive (currently a museum)

Location
- Location: Tlemcen, Tlemcen Province
- Country: Algeria
- Interactive map of Sidi Bellahsen Mosque
- Coordinates: 34°52′59″N 1°18′41″W

Architecture
- Style: Moorish (Zayyanid)
- Founder: Abi Ibrahim ibn Yahya
- Completed: 1296
- Minaret: 1

The Sidi Belahcen Mosque (Arabic: مسجد سيدي بلحسن; French: La Mosquée de Sidi Bel Hasan), also known as Sidi Bel Hasan Mosque or Sidi Abu al-Hasan Mosque is a former mosque in the city of Tlemcen, Algeria. The former mosque is located in the southwest of the square, next to the Great Mosque of Tlemcen.

The building has been repurposed as the National Public Museum of Islamic Calligraphy in Tlemcen, an Islamic art museum.

== History ==
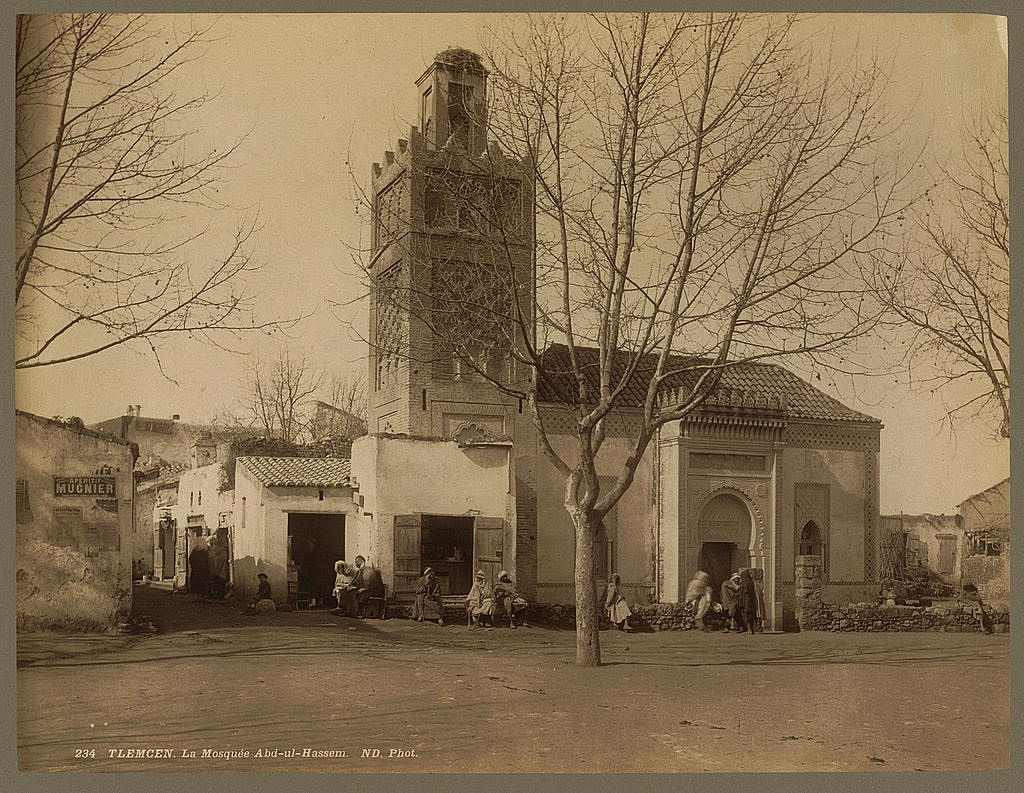
Photo of the mosque c. 1860

The mosque was founded in 1296 by the Zayyanid ruler Abi Ibrahim ibn Yahya, as inscribed on the plank of the western wall in the prayer hall and on the two groves made of plaster on top of the mihrab. The mosque's name is considered derived from the name of the local qadi and ulama Abi al-Hassan who served under the rule of Abu Said Uthman I (r. 1283–1303).

Today, the National Public Museum of Islamic Calligraphy (French: Musée public national de la calligraphie islamique) occupies the oratory of the former mosque, the adjoining room, the former courtyard, and a room on the second floor. The museum contains artefacts of Almoravid and Zayyanid art, relics found during excavations at Siga, Honaïne and the Agadir mosque, as well as Almohad and Roman coins.

== Architecture ==
The former mosque has rather modest appearance compared to the other mosques of the same era. The former mosque has no sahn and uses similar tiles for the floor and the qibla wall. The ceiling was consisted of interlocking logs made of cedar trees, which is the first of its kind in Algeria and predates three or four centuries the style employed in the Andalusian Moorish architecture.

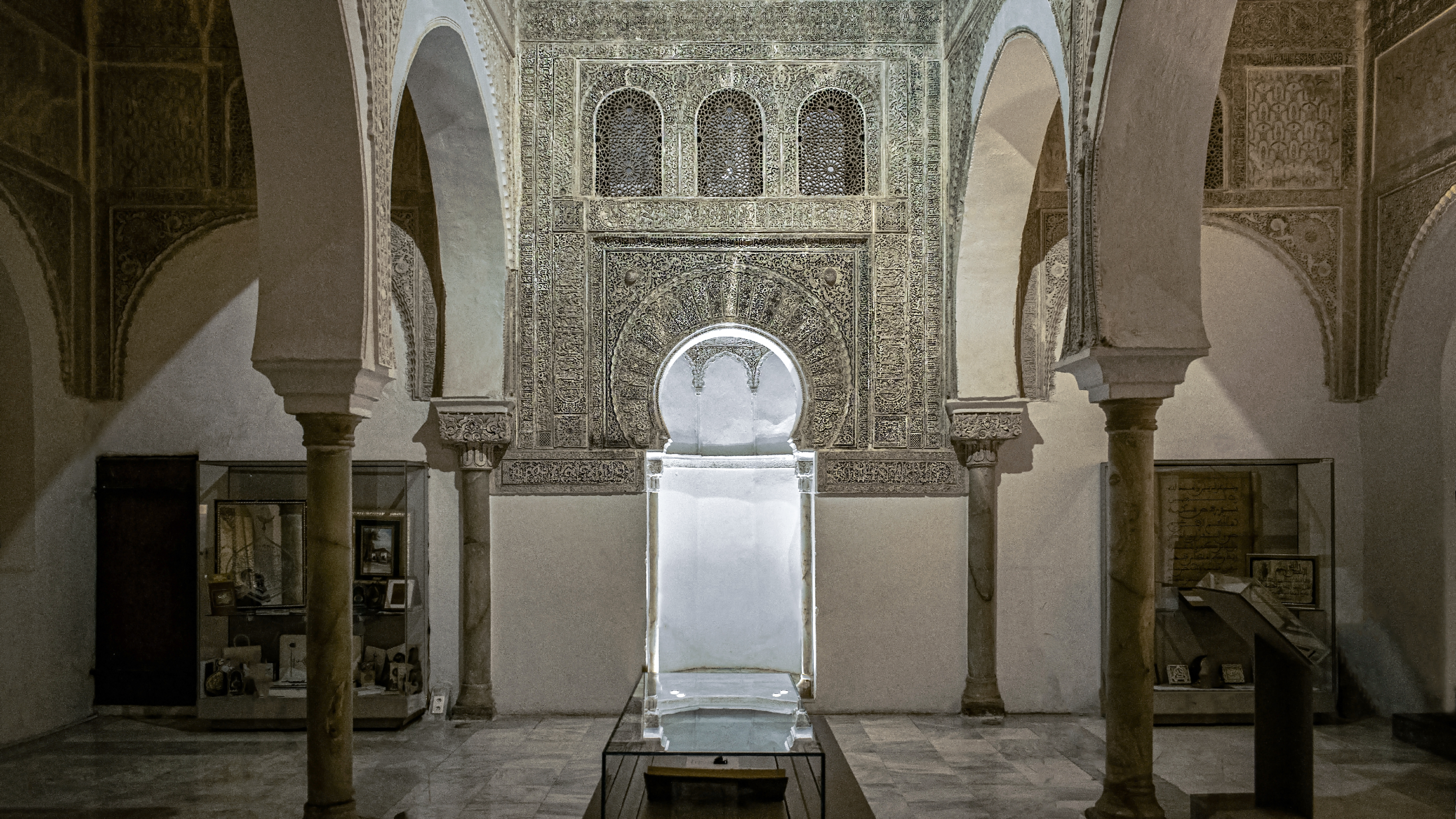
Inside the prayer hall, looking towards the mihrab (center)

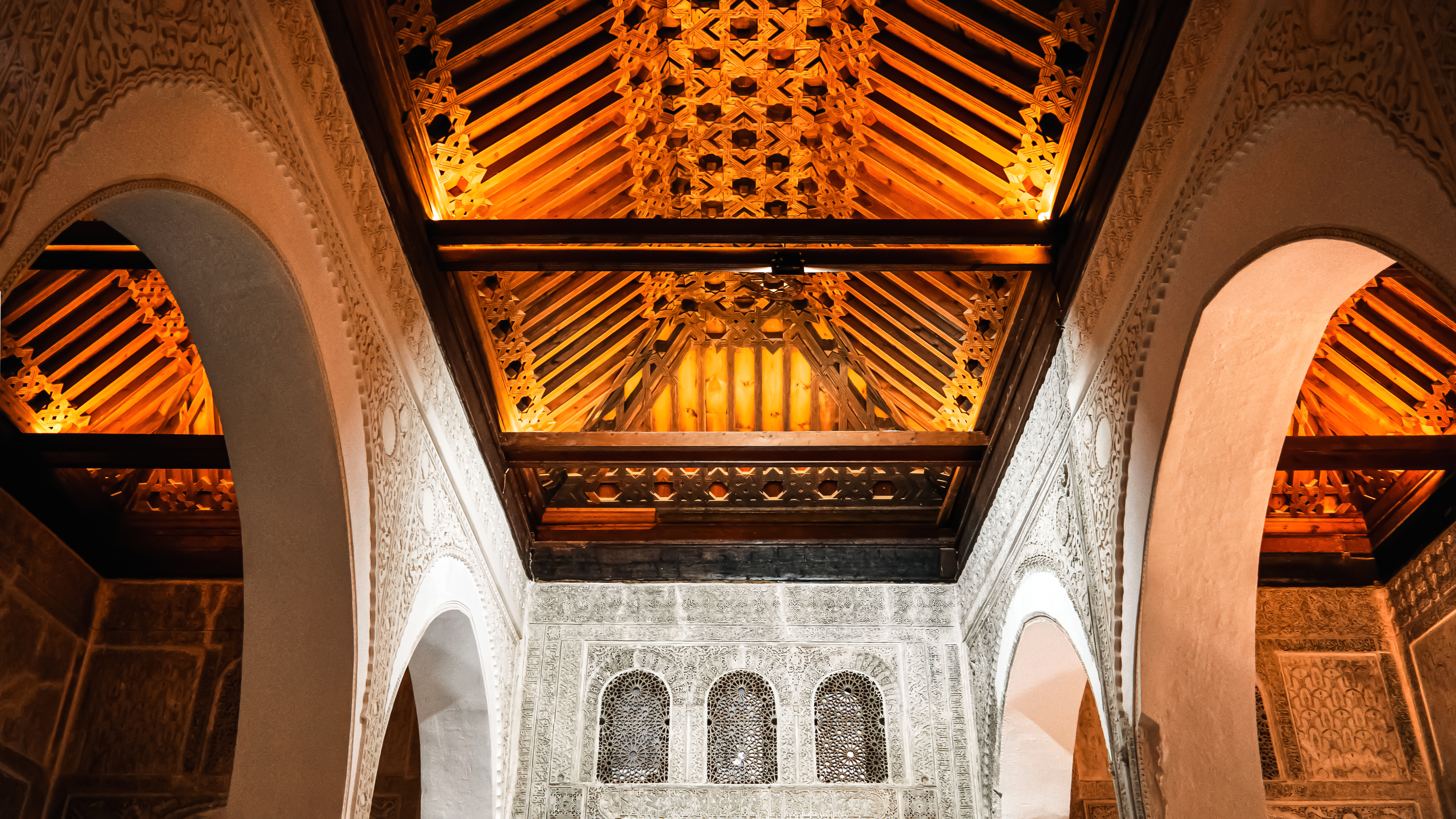
Ceiling of the prayer hall

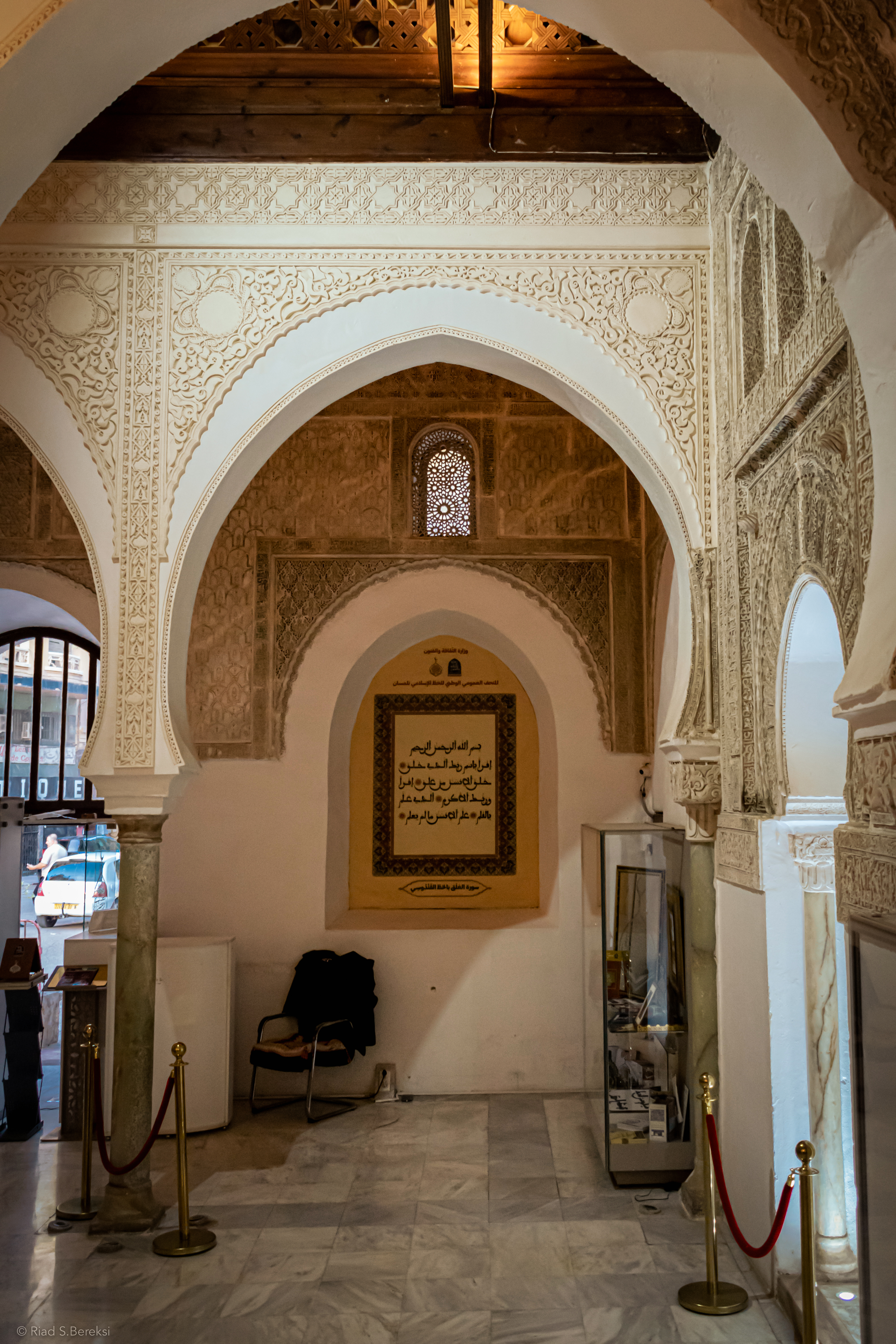
Transverse view of the prayer hall (mihrab on the right)

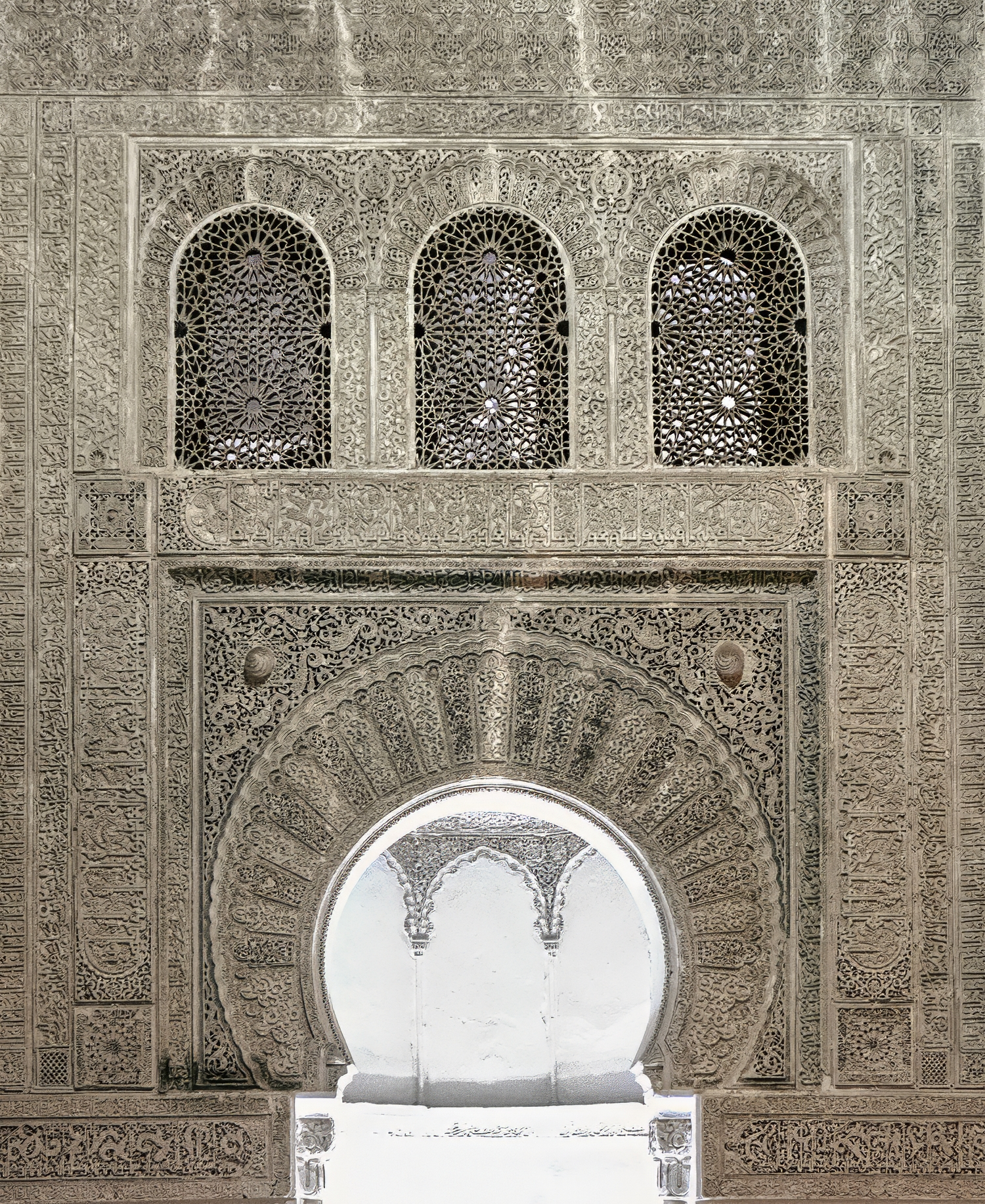
Mihrab decoration

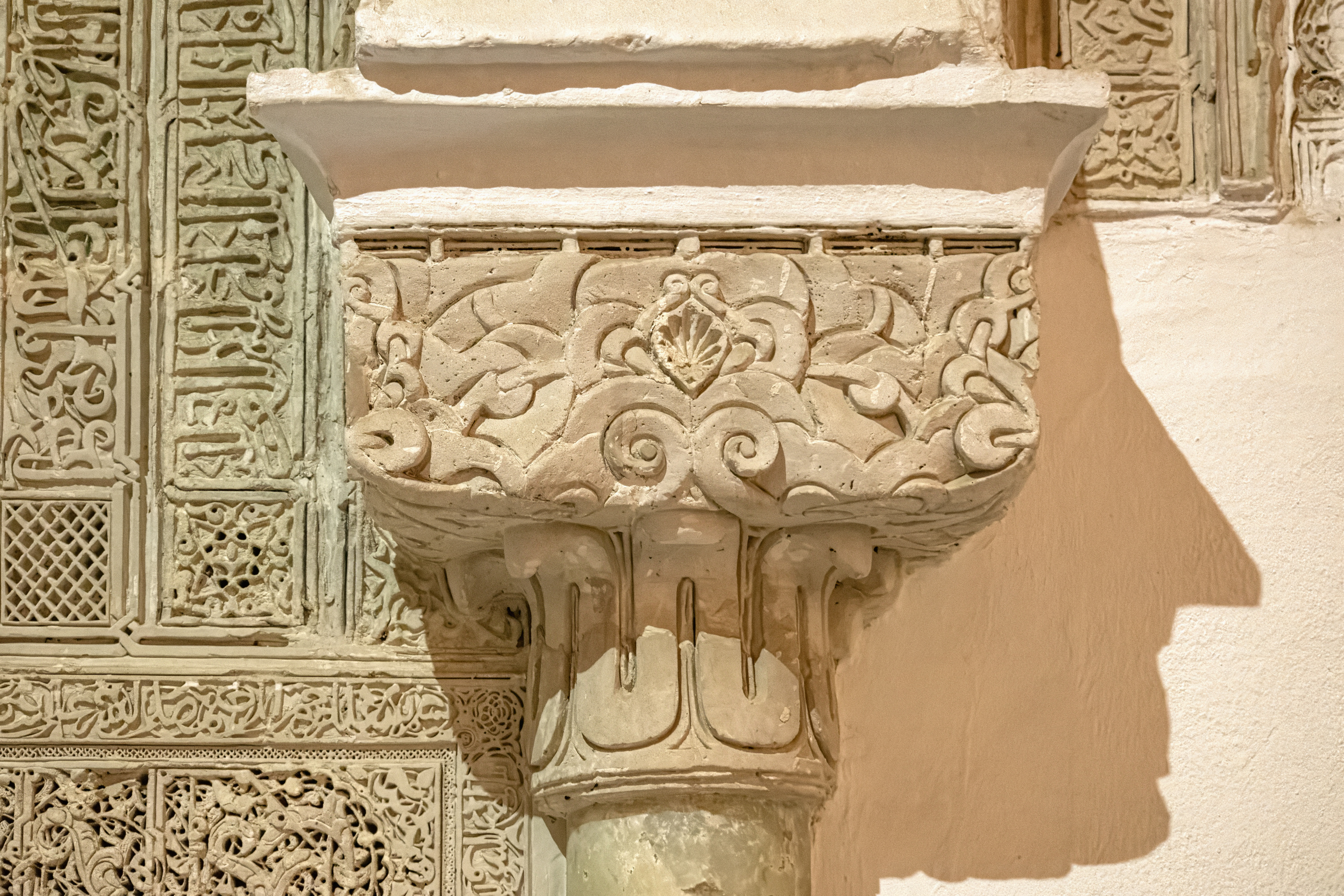
Decorative capital next to the mihrab

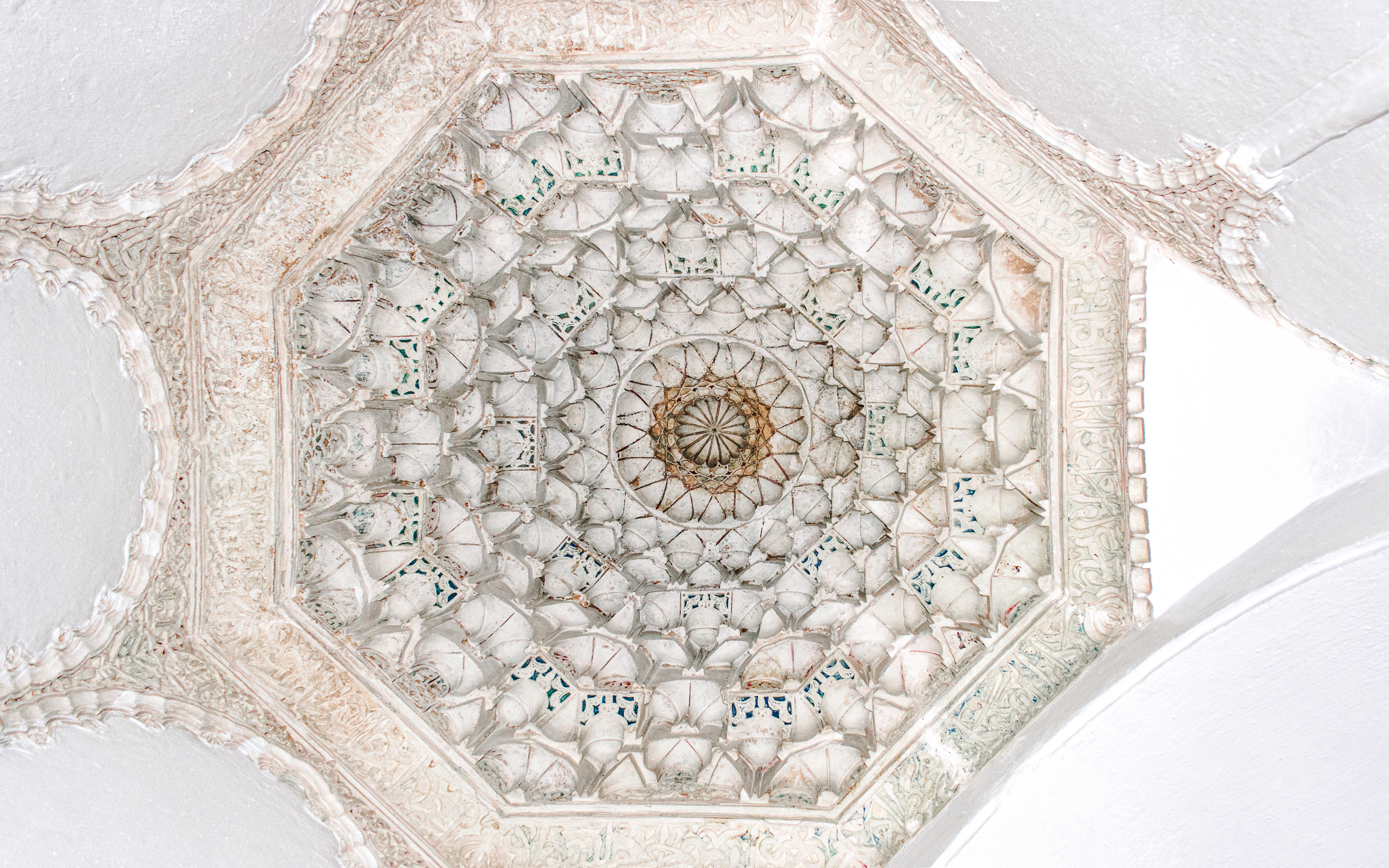
Muqarnas inside the mihrab

== See also ==
- Islam in Algeria
- List of mosques in Algeria
- List of museums in Algeria
