= El Mechouar Palace =

Zayyanid palace in Tlemcen, Algeria

Coordinates: 34.8815°N 01.3089°W

- قصر المشور
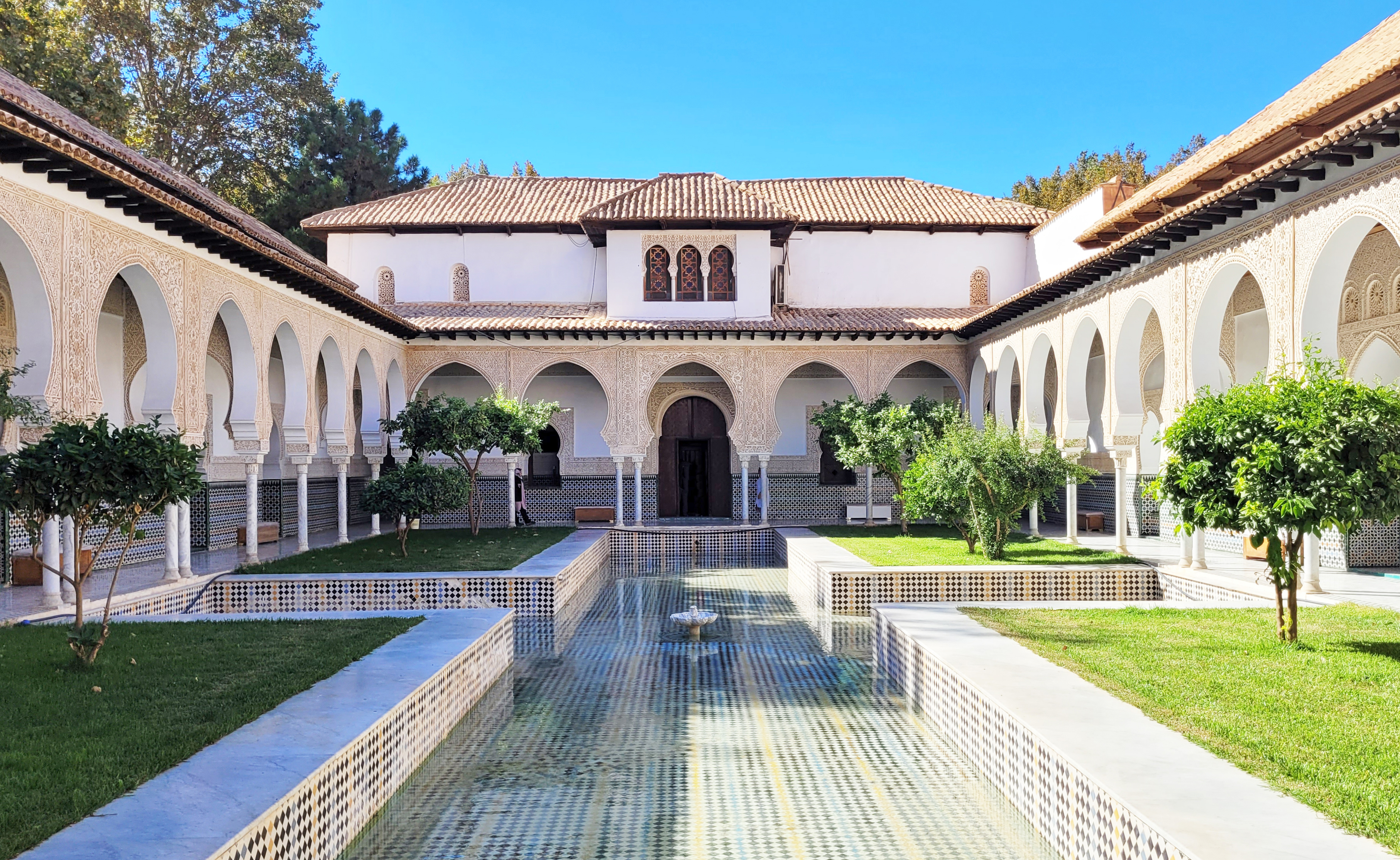
- Interactive map of the El Mechouar Palace area

General information
- Architectural style: Islamic architecture
- Location: Tlemcen, Algeria

Mechouar Palace (Arabic: قصر المشور) or the Zianide Royal Palace is the former official residence of the Zayyanid dynasty in the city of Tlemcen, Algeria. The palace is situated in the middle of the city, and used to be part of the greater Mechouar Citadel (Arabic: قلعة المشور) of which the historic defensive walls are the only major element preserved. During the Zayyanid period, the palace consisted of multiple buildings and courtyard residences. One of these courtyard structures was completely rebuilt in 2010–2011 over its former ruins and is accessible today. The nearby mosque, Mechouar Mosque, no longer exist on its original form as well except for its minaret. It was one of the main sights during the selection of Tlemcen as the Capital of Islamic Culture in 2011.

== Etymology ==
The name of the palace "Mechouar" was decided upon consultation by the Sultan Amir al-Muslimin among his viziers and officers. Mechouar in general sense could designate a place for consultation traditionally established in the Maghrebi region (Arabic: mushawara), where government of sultan's affairs are managed.

== History ==
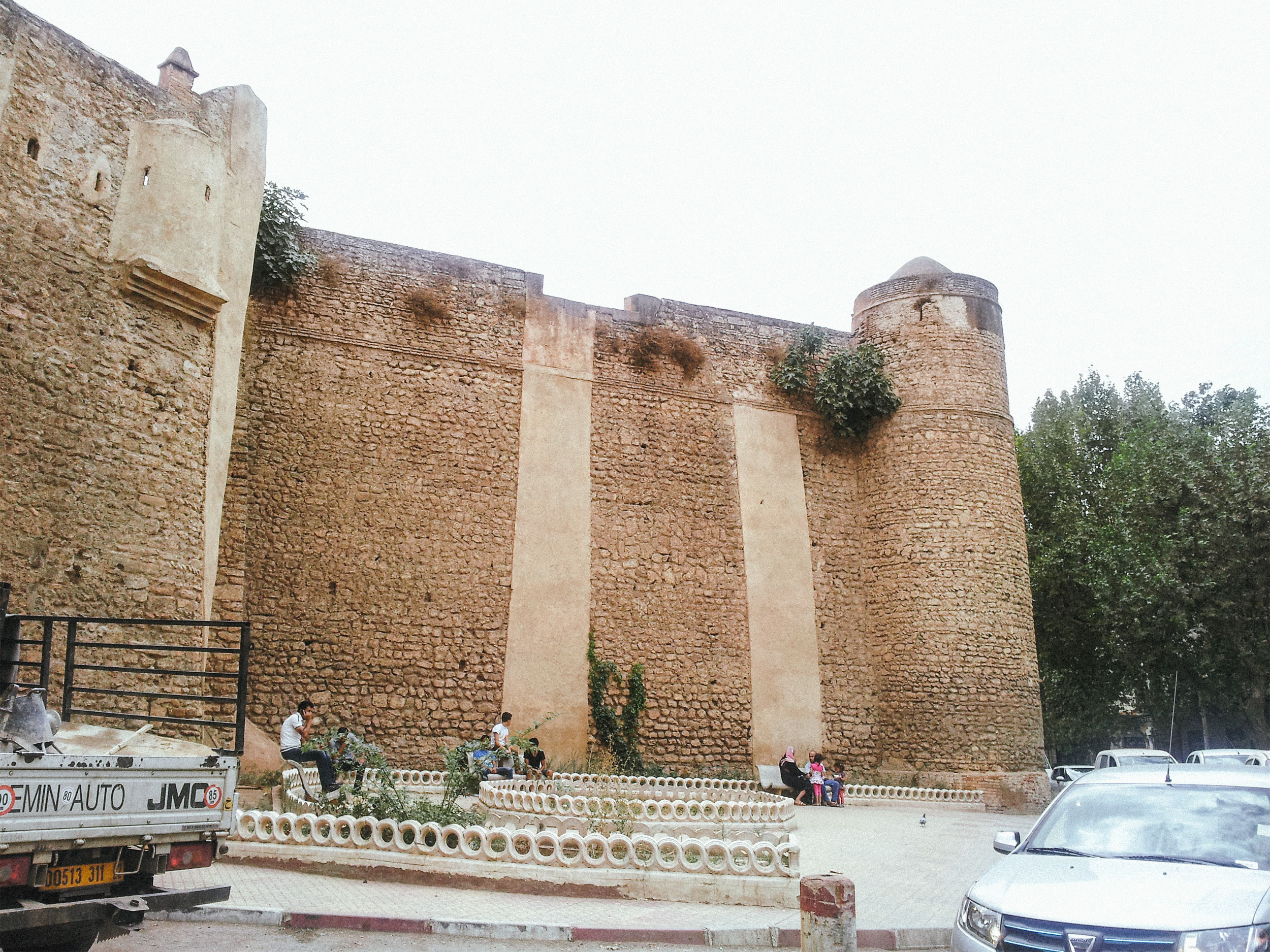
The walls of the Mechouar citadel

The construction of the Mechouar was undertaken by Yaghmurasen Ibn Zyan, the founder of the Zayyanid dynasty. The reasons that led him to abandon the old palace near Tlemcen's Great Mosque and build a new one are unknown, but according to tradition, his decision could have been prompted by either the fear of exposing his harem to prying eyes when he realized that the inside of the palace was overlooked by the minaret he had erected for the mosque next door, or the need to create a residence of his own, where his royal dignity was asserted. The location of the Mechouar was formerly the site of a kasbah established by the Almoravid leader Yusuf ibn Tashfin in what was then Tagrart (now part of Tlemcen) and then used by the Almohads.

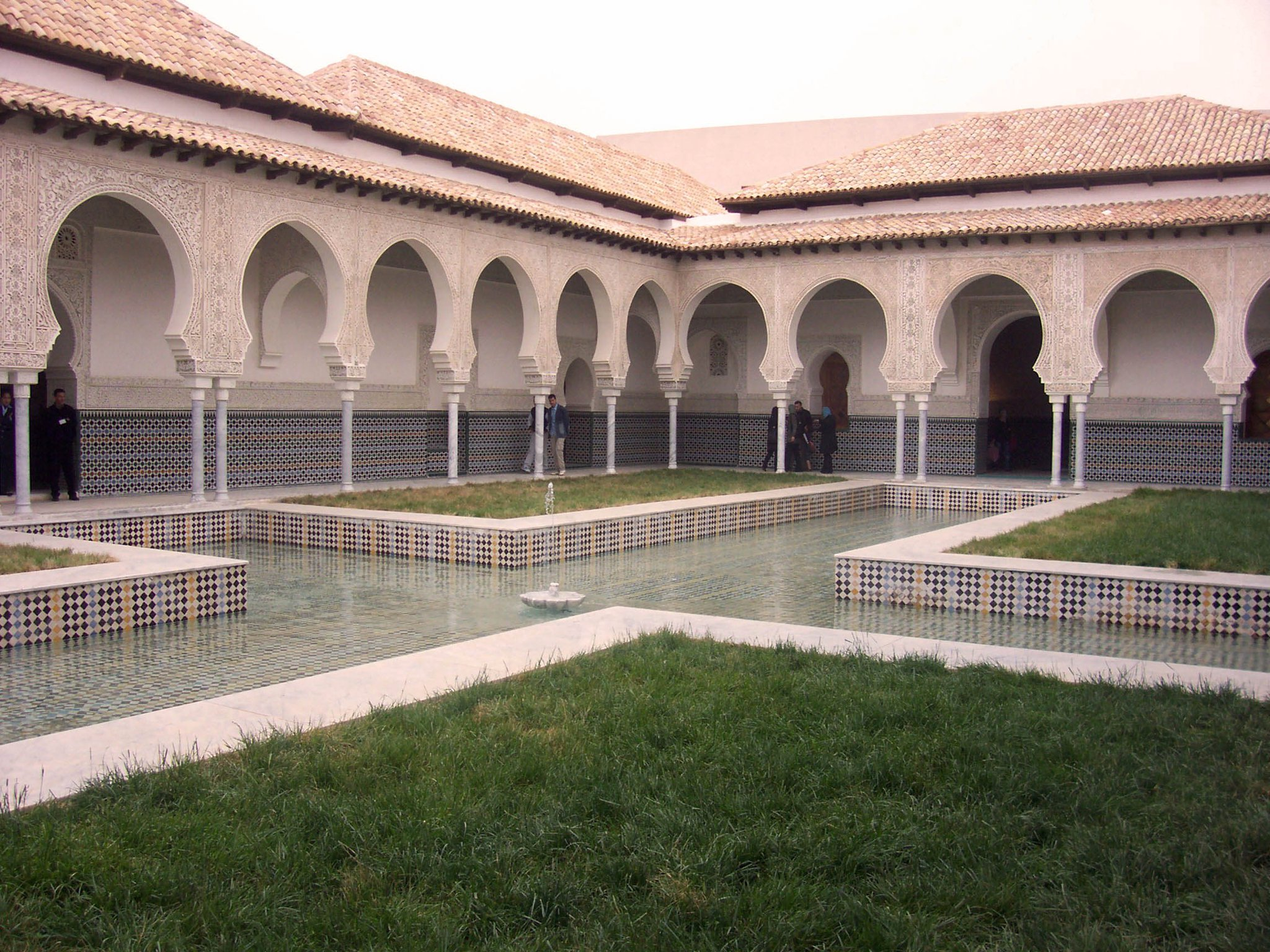
Mechouar Palace, after the 2010 reconstruction

The palatial complex contained multiple residences, pavilions, and gardens, as well as other amenities like a mosque and a hammam (bathhouse). The main residences were in the form of courtyard buildings with a fountain or water basin at their center. During the Zayyanid period, there were four main palaces: Dar al-Malik (Arabic: دار الملك), Dar Abu Fahr (Arabic: دار ابي فهر), Dar al-Surur (Arabic: دار السرور), and Dar al-Raha (Arabic: دار الراحة). Three of these were built by Abu Tashfin I (r. 1318–1337). Some of the palaces were adapted to serve for different seasons. The summer residence was built with mudbrick which kept the temperature cool, while the winter residence was made of stone which kept it warm during the cold months. Inside the summer residence was a secret passage to the adjacent mosque, which was used by the ruler during prayer time to move between the mosque and the palace while remaining unseen by the public. The passage could accommodate horses. The walls of the palace were decorated and rich decoration including zellij (tile mosaic) and carved stucco. Among the decorative motifs were Islamic calligraphy, including one sentence repeatedly inscribed which read "The splendor of God...the king that is in God" ("العزُّ القائم بالله.. الملك القائم بالله"). One of the palaces studied by modern archeologists featured a central alcove at the back of its large audience hall, an element that had precedents in earlier Zirid and Fatimid palaces but distinguished it from contemporary palace architecture in other regions.

Later during Ottoman rule, several rooms were destroyed by the Ottoman Algerian Beys during an uprising in Tlemcen against their rule. The French, led by Marshal Clausel, came to the aid of the Kouloughli garrison of Mechouar led by Mustapha Ben Ismail in 1836, and evacuated them from the city.After 1843, French occupational forces took over the palace by force, destroying some other remaining parts of it in the process. The Algerian religious and military leader Emir Abdelkader stayed in the palace for four full years during the negotiations with the French regarding the Treaty of Tafna, but he left once the treaty was breached by French forces. During the French occupation, the citadel was converted into a military barracks and the palace was converted into a military hospital, when several parts of its historical heritage were destroyed.

The ruins of one of the palaces that was used as a barracks by the French were excavated and studied in 2008. They were afterwards subjected to a near-complete reconstruction in 2010–2011 on top of the remains, which has been criticized by some scholars and conservationists. Excavations prior to the reconstruction documented a part of the original palace layout and some of its zellij decoration. The extent to which the current building reflects the palace's original design is unclear.

El Mechouar Palace today

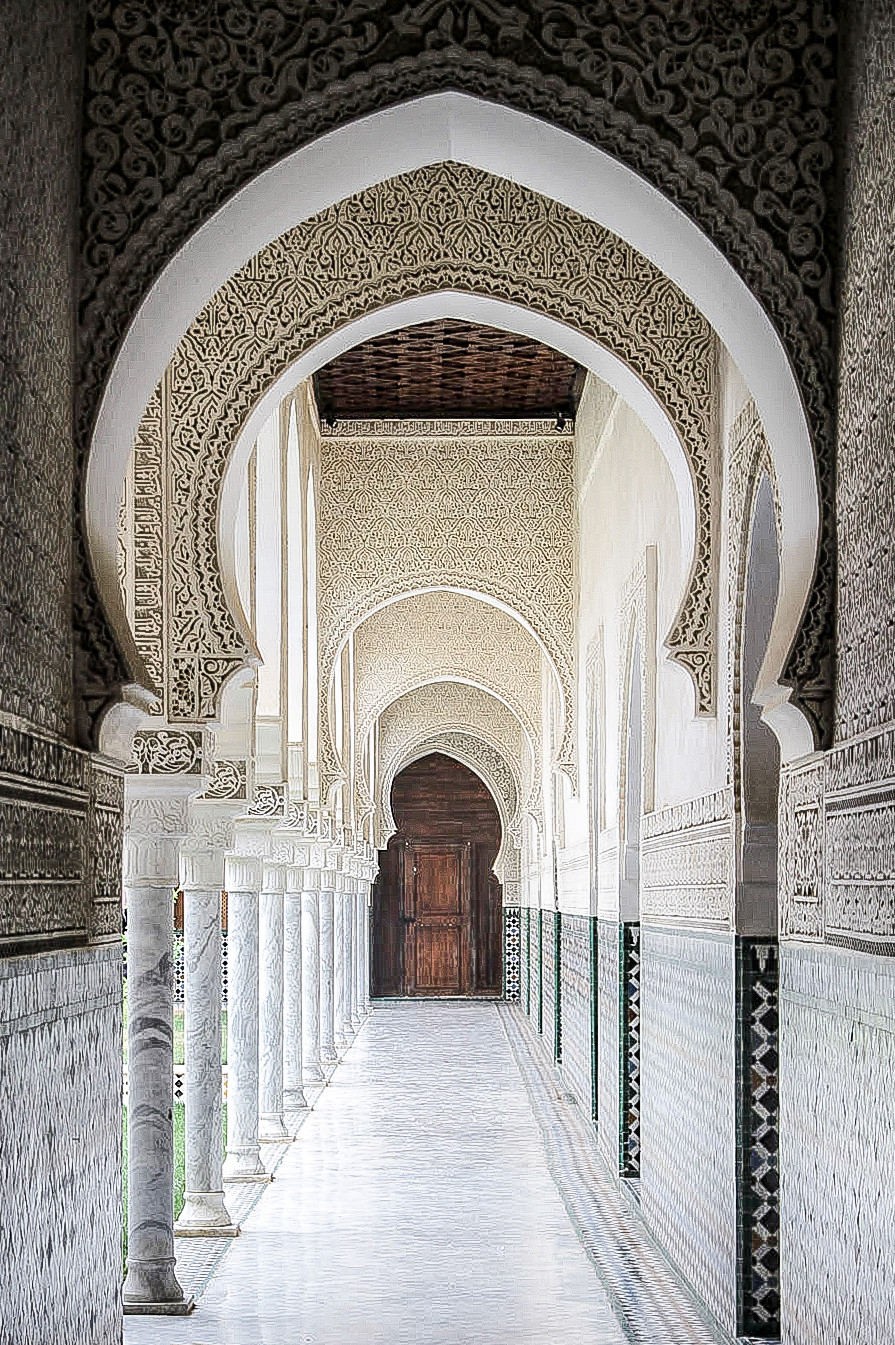
Gallery around the courtyard of the palace

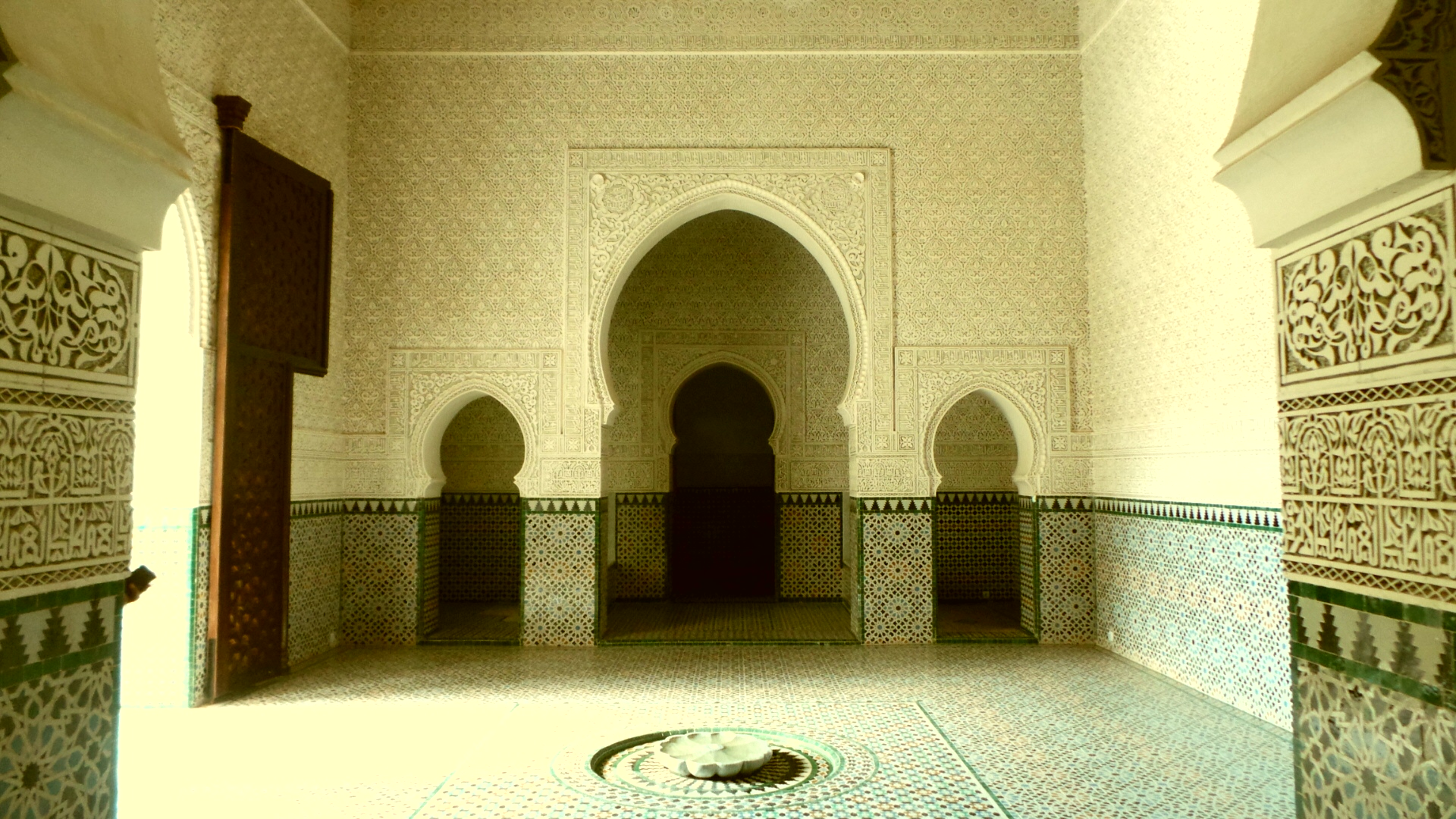
Hall inside the palace

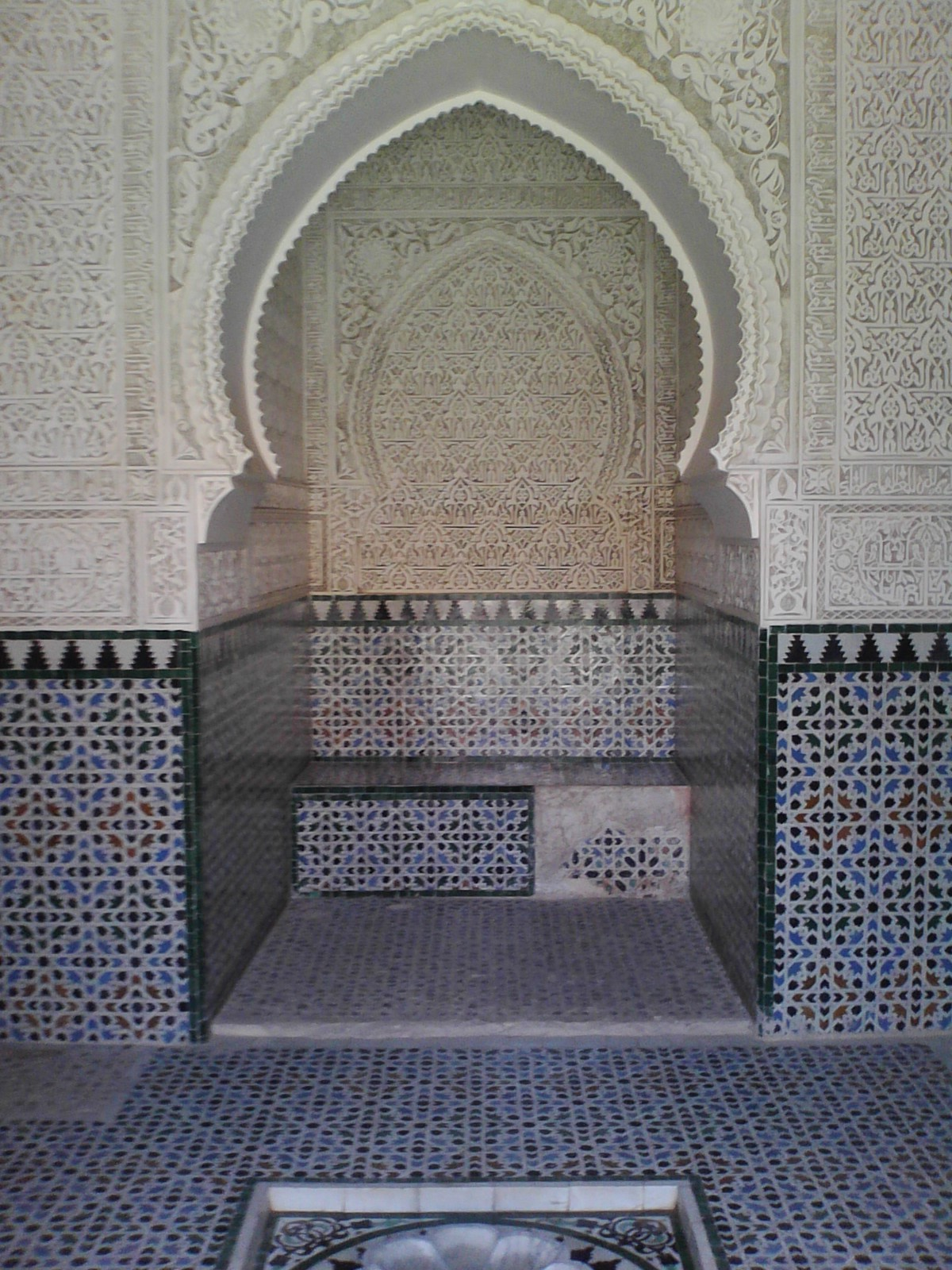
Central alcove in one of the halls, a distinguishing layout feature of the original palace

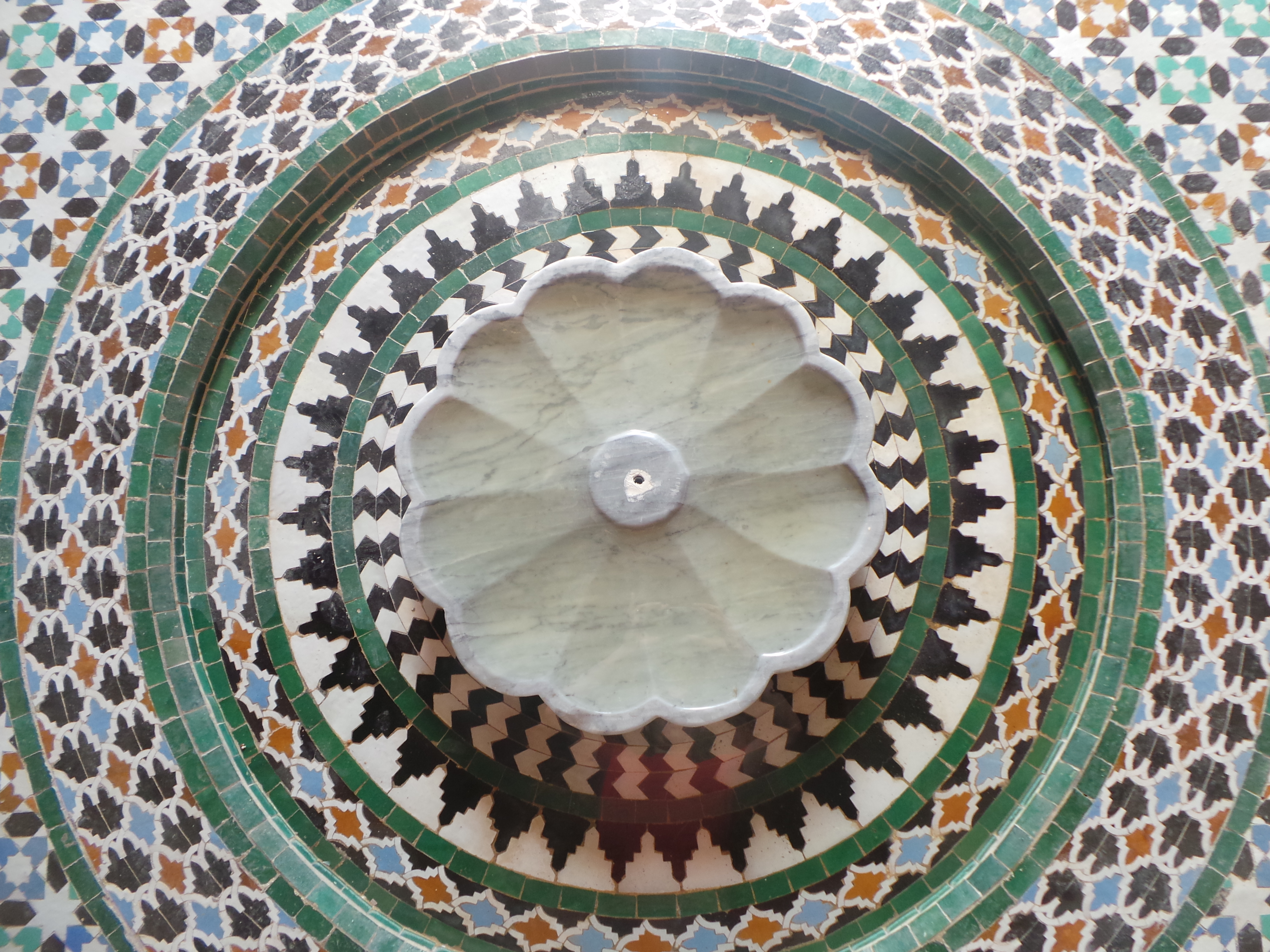
Fountain in one of the halls

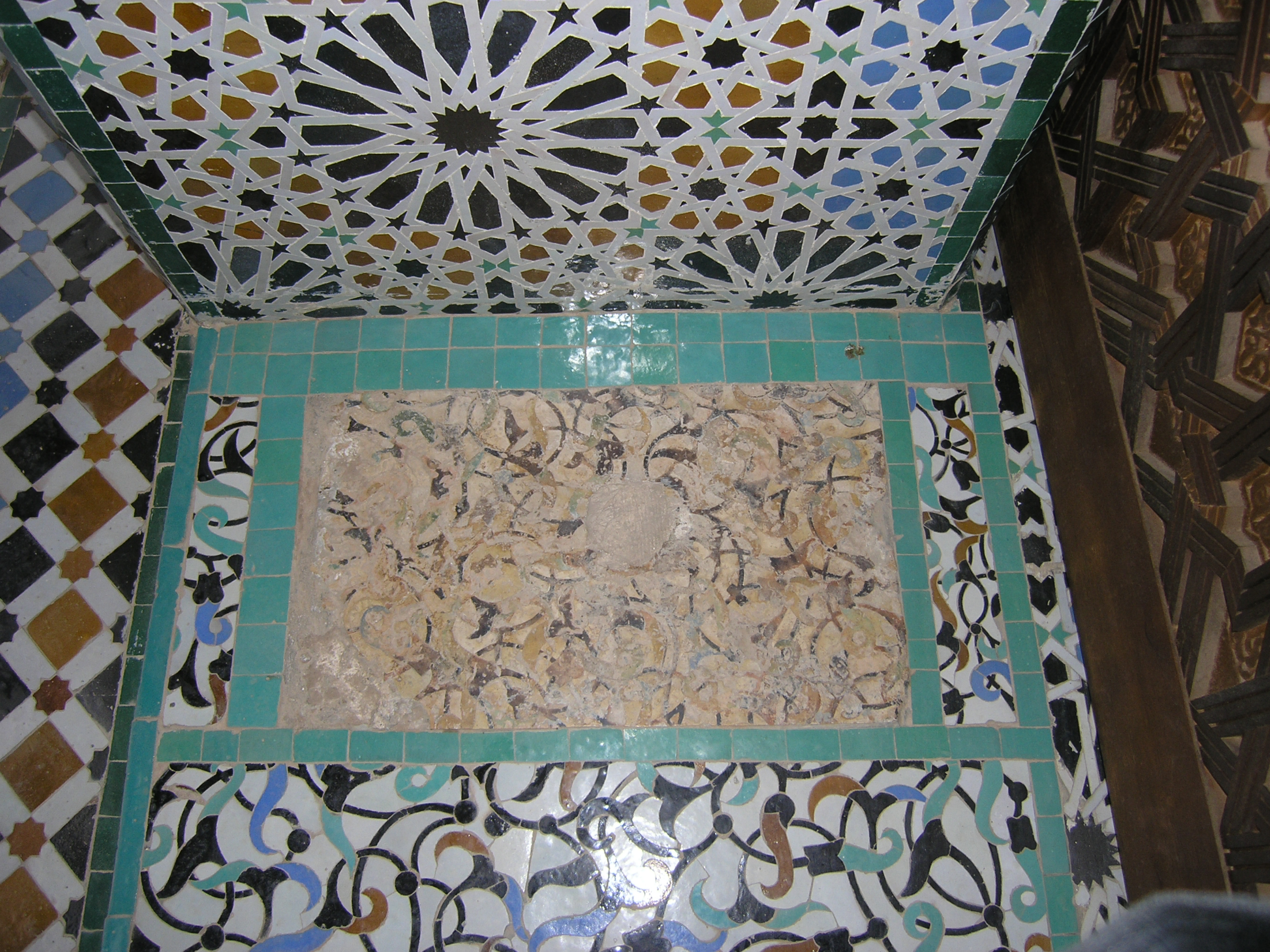
A preserved fragment of historic zellij paving inside the palace

== See also ==
- Mechouar
