= El Mechouar Mosque =

Mosque in Tlemcen, Algeria

- مسجد المشور
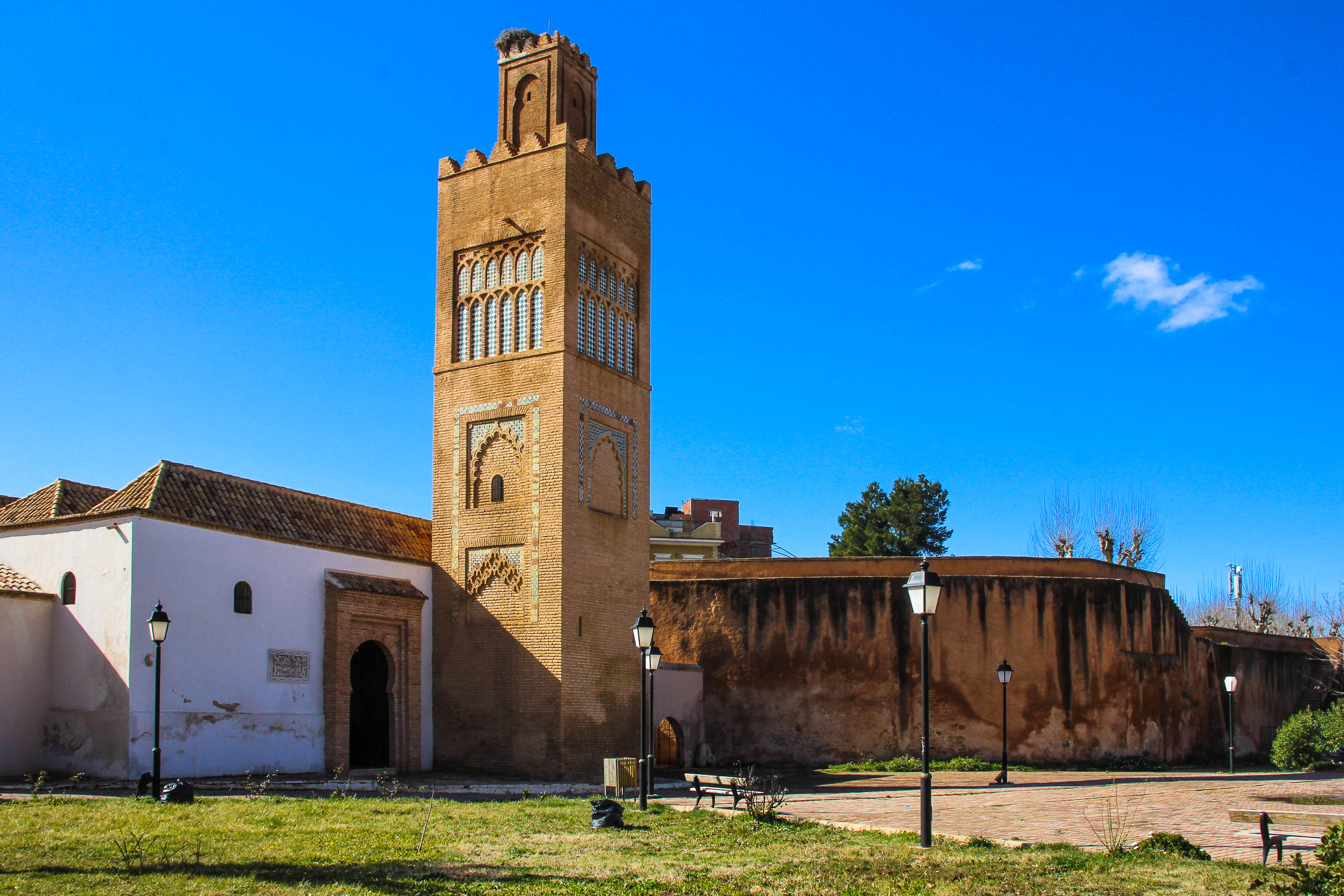
- The original minaret of the mosque

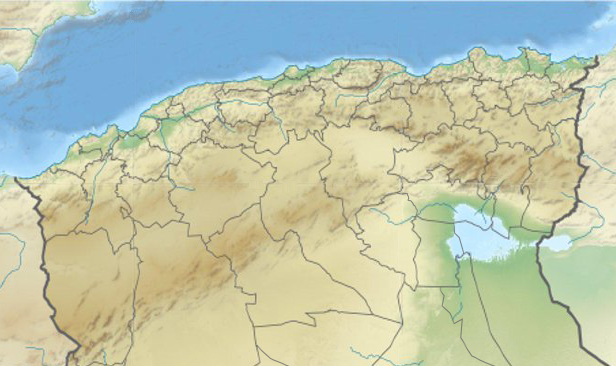
- Location of the mosque in northern Algeria

Religion
- Affiliation: Islam
- Ecclesiastical or organizational status: Mosque (1310–1840); Church (1840– ); Profane use ( –1962); Mosque (since 1962– )
- Status: Active

Location
- Location: El Mechouar Palace, Tlemcen, Tlemcen Province
- Country: Algeria
- Interactive map of El Mechouar Mosque
- Coordinates: 34°52′52″N 1°18′41″W

Architecture
- Type: Islamic architecture
- Founder: Abu Hammu I
- Completed: 1310 CE
- Minaret: 1

The Mechouar Mosque (Arabic: مسجد المشور) is a mosque in the city of Tlemcen, Algeria. The mosque is a part of the historic El Mechouar Palace which has a significant place in the history of the Kingdom of Tlemcen.

The mosque contributed greatly to the intellectual development of Tlemcen. It was one of the main sites during the selection of Tlemcen as the Capital of Islamic Culture in 2011.

== History ==
The mosque was built by Abu Hammu I in 1310 CE, following construction of the castle. It played a substantial role for Islamic intellectual development in Tlemcen, and there generations of ulamas had taught and had been taught. It was renovated several times by the Turks. However, it was converted by the French into a church in 1840, and the original roof was stripped off at the same time. During the French occupation, Tlemcen and the mosque became a center for Christianity. Later the mosque was sacked and turned into a warehouse for the military hospital. The mosque only regained its original function after the independence of Algeria, in 1962.

== Architecture ==
The mosque has no sahn and the minaret is the only part surviving in its original form. The minaret is square-shaped and covered with daylighting. Four facades of the mosque are decorated with Zellige tiles and clays. The lower part of the minaret is covered with rectangular panel surrounded by Zellige squares with a metallic luster. The minaret is the only one decorated by Zellige in Tlemcen.

== Gallery ==
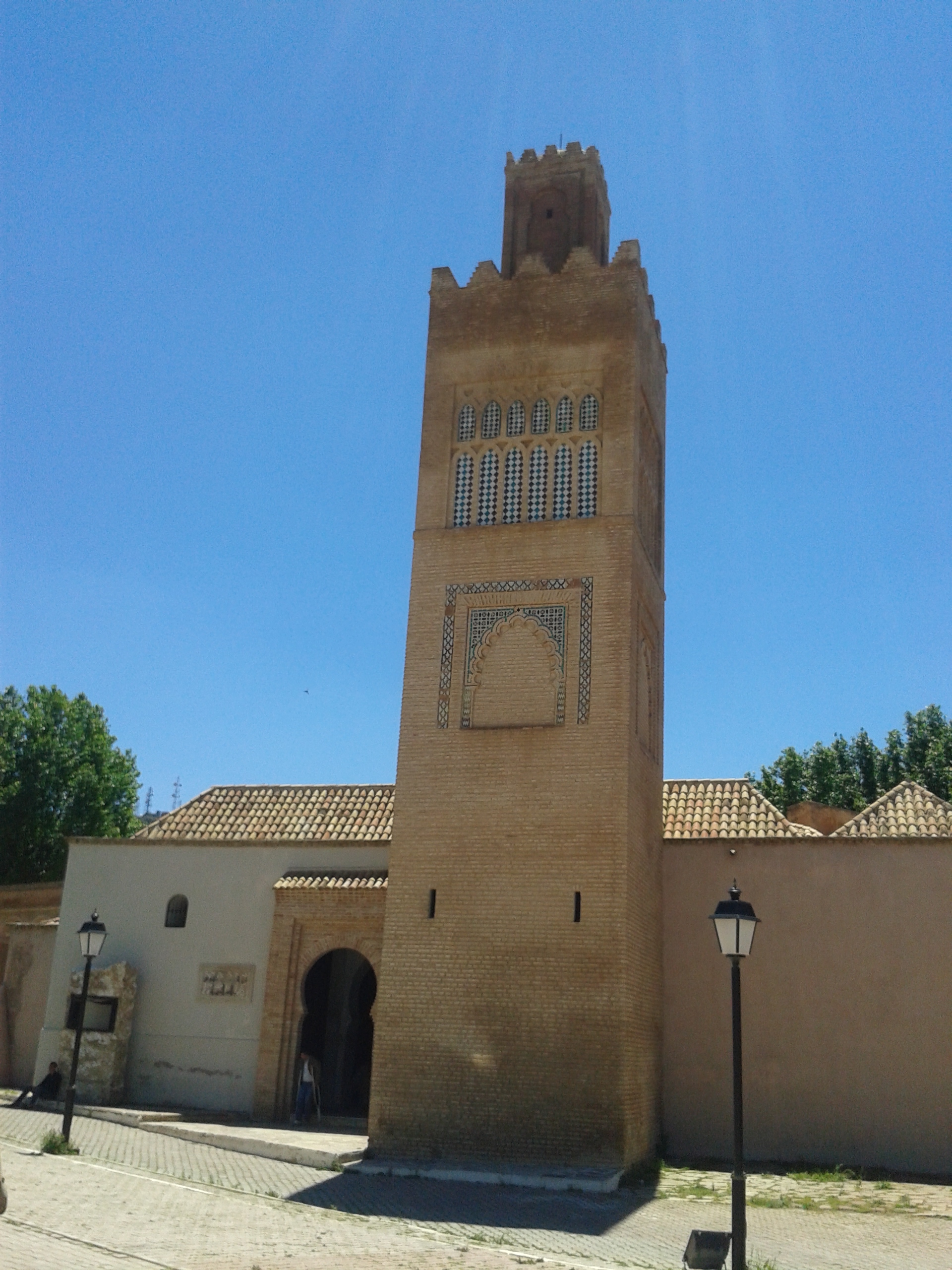
Close-up of the minaret

El Mechouar Mosque

== See also ==
- Islam in Algeria
- List of mosques in Algeria
- List of cultural assets of Algeria in Tlemcen Province
