= Umm al-Fath (II) =

Nasrid princess

Umm al-Fath II
- Born: Granada,Emirate of Granada
- Died: before 1450; Emirate of Granada
- Spouse: Muhammad IX of Granada
- Issue: Aisha; Fatima
- House: Nasrid
- Father: Yusuf II of Granada
- Mother: Umm walad

Umm al-Fath (II) (died before 1450), was a Nasrid princess married to Muhammad IX of Granada.

She is called Umm al-Fath (II) because there were two other Nasrid princesses with the same name: Umm al-Fath (I), mother of Muhammad VIII of Granada, and Umm al-Fath (III), married to Muhammad X of Granada.

== Life ==
She was born to Yusuf II of Granada and an unknown slave concubine. She was the sister of Ismail III of Granada, Yusuf III of Granada and Muhammad VII of Granada. She was close to two of her three reigning brothers, Yusuf III of Granada and Muhammad VII of Granada, and reportedly acted as their advisers.

Umm al-Fath was arranged to marry her cousin prince Muhammad on an unknown date. They had two daughters: Aisha and Fatima. The princes of the Nasrid dynasty could have many slave concubines, but normally only married members of the Nasrid dynasty to benefit dynastic legitimacy, forge alliances between different family fractions and keep royal property in the family. She owned considerable property. The Nasrid princesses had control over their own property (dowry) in accordance with Islamic law and were free to dispose of it as they pleased, provided they continued to observe the seclusion of the Nasrid harem's sex segregation.

In 1419, her husband deposed her nephew Muhammad VIII of Granada and took the throne as Muhammad IX. After the coup, the wife of Muhammad IX ordered the execution of the deposed ruler's vizier herself, so that Muhammad IX could avoid breaking his promise of amnesty. It is traditionally assumed that it was Muhammad IX's other wife Zahr al-Riyad who had the vizier executed, but it could also be Umm al-Fath (II), who are known to have legitimized the coup by giving it her blessing. Umm al-Fath (II) was Muhammad IX's favorite spouse, and are reported to have had considerable influence on him and the state affairs.

Umm al-Fath (II) was given a biography in Junnat al- rida ϔi l-taslim li-ma qaddara Allah wa-qad a, by the vizier Ibn ‘Asim from circa 1450. It was a propaganda work on the reign of Muhammad IX, in which Umm al-Fath and her virtues were praised, and her spouse was described as honoring her memory, meaning she would have been dead by before then. A contemporary biography about a Nasrid princess was very unusual, since it was seen as honorable for a Muslim woman to be completely hidden from the world and never publicly mentioned, and data on the Nasrid princesses are consequently otherwise rare.
