= Zahr al-Riyad =

- Born: Emirate of Granada
- Died: December 1431; Emirate of Granada
- Spouse: Muhammad IX of Granada (m. 1419)
- House: Nasrid
- Father: Abu Surur Mufarrij
- Mother: Gayat al-Munya

Zahr al-Riyad (died 1431), was a consort of Muhammad IX of Granada.

== Parents and Christian descent ==
Zahr al-Riyad was born to the vizier Abu Surur Mufarrij and the Nasrid princess Gayat al-Munya. Through her father, she belonged to the powerful Banu Sarraj (“Abencerrajes”) clan. Since her father was originally a Christian slave, there have been speculations as to whether Zahr al-Riyad herself had originally been born a Christian slave. However, since her mother was reportedly a Nasrid princess, it is not likely Zahr al-Riyad was born a slave, providing the Nasrid princess was her biological mother, since a Muslim princess would never been allowed to marry her father if he had still been a slave at that point.

The princes of the Nasrid dynasty could have many slave concubines, but normally only married members of the Nasrid dynasty to benefit dynastic legitimacy, forge alliances between different family fractions and keep royal property in the family. The Nasrid princesses had control over their own property (dowry) in accordance with Islamic law and were free to dispose of it as they pleased, provided they continued to observe the seclusion of the Nasrid harem's sex segregation.

== Arranged marriage and rise to power in a coup ==
Her marriage was possibly arranged to ally Muhammad IX to the Banu Sarraj party in order to depose Muhammad VIII of Granada in 1419, upon which her husband took the throne as Muhammad IX. After the coup, the wife of Muhammad IX ordered the execution of the deposed ruler's vizier herself, so that Muhammad IX could avoid breaking his promise of amnesty. It is traditionally assumed that Zahr al-Riyad was the wife who had the vizier executed, as her first act to benefit the Banu Sarraj clan, but it could also be Muhammad IX's other spouse Umm al-Fath (II), who are known to have legitimized the coup by giving it her approval.

== Diplomatic correspondence with Alfonso V of Aragon ==
Zahr al-Riyad played a political role from inside the royal harem during the reign of Muhammad IX, despite not being his favorite spouse. She functioned as a mediator and channel between Muhammad IX and her clan Banu Sarraj, which was a major player in the politics of Granada in this time period. In 1430 she conducted diplomatic negotiations via correspondence with king Alfonso V of Aragon to form an alliance with Aragon to support her husband against his rival Yusuf ibn al-Mawl, who was allied with Castile. This was the only occasion in which a Nasrid princess corresponded and negotiated with a Christian king.

== Death ==
Zahr al-Riyad died in 1431, probably in December, before Yusuf ibn al-Mawl took Granada from her spouse, who fled to Malaga.
