= Yusuf V of Granada =

Yusuf V يوسف الخامس

Sultan of Granada
- Reign: 1445–1446
- Predecessor: Muhammad IX of Granada
- Successor: Ismail III of Granada
- Born: c. 1400-1410
- Died: 1447
- House: Nasrid dynasty
- Father: Abu l-ʿAbbas Ahmad b. Naṣr
- Mother: Fatima al-hurra

Yusuf V (c. 1440/1410–1447), also known as known as "The Lame One" (al-Ahnaf / el Cojo), was the seventeenth Nasrid ruler of the Emirate of Granada.

Traditionally, historians have identified this emir as Abu 'Abd Allah Muhammad b. 'Uthman, ruling as Muhammad X. This assessment was based on Castilian chronicles which identified him only as el Cojo ("the Lame One"). However, following publication of a new Nasrid-era Arabic source, Ibn c aṣim's Junnat al-Rida, it has been shown that he was actually Yusuf b. Ahmad ruling as Yusuf V.

Born in the first decade of the fifteenth century, he was the son of Abu l-ʿAbbas Ahmad b. Naṣr. Although his father never ascended the throne, Yusuf belonged to the core of the Nasrid royal lineage. He first gained prominence in 1431 as commander of the Granadan army at the Battle of Higueruela against John II of Castile, and soon emerged as a central figure in the restoration of Muhammad IX to the throne. Appointed warden of Almería amid growing tensions at court, he gradually asserted increasing autonomy, ultimately proclaiming himself sultan and forcing his uncle’s abdication in 1445.

Yusuf V’s brief reign (1445–1446) was marked by administrative reorganization, factional realignments, and renewed frontier warfare, but it was quickly undermined by rival claimants and internal dissent. Deposed in early 1446 by the pretender Ismail III, he continued to resist from Almería, conducting vigorous campaigns against both his rival and Castilian strongholds, and recovering several fortresses along the frontier. His efforts significantly weakened Ismail’s position, yet his career ended abruptly when he was assassinated by his own vizier in 1447.

== Birth and Family ==
Yusuf’s exact date of birth is unknown but indirect evidence provides a reasonable estimate. His father, Abu l-Abbas Ahmad b. Naṣr, was born around 1380, and Yusuf himself was already commanding the Granadan army in 1431 at the Battle of Higueruela. On this basis, historians place his birth in the first decade of the fifteenth century.

Although his father never ascended the throne, Yusuf belonged to the core of the Nasrid royal lineage. He was the grandson of Yusuf II and grandnephew of the celebrated Muhammad V, one of the dynasty’s greatest rulers. He was also nephew to two reigning emirs: Muhammad VII and Yusuf III.

His mother, Fatima al-hurra, was sister to Muhammad IX, who reigned multiple times between 1419 and 1453. Contemporary accounts emphasize the particularly close bond between Fatima and her brother, suggesting that maternal ties significantly strengthened Yusuf’s political position. This relationship would later prove decisive in his rise to power. Yusuf also had at least one sister. In December 1431, when Muhammad IX fled Granada in the face of advancing rivals, he took her with him.

== Military career ==
Yusuf’s first documented public role came in 1431, when he commanded the Nasrid forces at the Battle of Higueruela near Granada. The engagement pitted the army of the Emirate against the powerful Castilian forces of John II of Castile. Although the battle did not decisively alter the balance of power, Yusuf’s leadership at such a young age demonstrates both his prominence within the ruling family and his recognized military competence. His command enhanced his prestige among the Granadan elite and the army.

In December 1431, Yusuf accompanied his uncle Muhammad IX when the latter fled the Alhambra due to the advance of the rival claimant Yusuf IV. From Granada they went first to Almería and then to Málaga where they regrouped and made plans with other loyal factions to retake the throne.

During the campaign to restore Muhammad IX, Yusuf played a decisive role. He led forces from Málaga toward Granada, entered the capital, and laid siege to the Alhambra, then held by the rival emir. In March 1432, he confronted Castilian troops allied with Yusuf IV on the outskirts of Granada. By late April, Yusuf succeeded in entering the summer palace and opening the gates of the Alhambra from the rear, effectively securing his uncle’s restoration. His contribution was so central that chroniclers regard him as the principal architect of Muhammad IX’s return to power. This achievement substantially increased his prestige and political standing.

In June 1432, shortly after Muhammad IX’s reinstatement, Yusuf departed the capital to reinforce troops in Guadix, which were attempting to repel Castilian raids. Despite the ultimate defeat of the Granadan forces, Yusuf’s continued leadership reinforced his military credentials.

== Conflict and rebellion ==
However, relations between uncle and nephew deteriorated. The reasons are unclear, but court intrigues appear to have widened the rift. Fearing a destructive conflict between her brother the Emir and her son Yusuf, Fatima al-hurra intervened. She persuaded Muhammad IX to appoint Yusuf warden of the Alcazaba of Almería.

The emir hoped the assignment might remove Yusuf as a potential rival but that was not the case. As warden of Almería, Yusuf gradually asserted increasing autonomy. He began to exercise powers normally reserved for the sultan, including minting coins in his own name and levying taxes. He even launched military actions against neighboring governors, besieging towns such as Santa Cruz de Marchena and Andarax.

Muhammad IX eventually marched against him while Yusuf fortified himself within the Alcazaba and proclaimed himself sultan. After a month-long siege and several clashes, Muhammad IX withdrew, only to discover that major cities, including Granada and Guadix, had risen in Yusuf’s favor.

Facing widespread defection, Muhammad IX abdicated in 1445. In exchange, he secured favorable terms, including residence in the Alhambra and control of Salobreña and Motril.

== Reign as Sultan (1445–1446) ==
Adopting the honorific Abu l-haŷŷaŷ and the regnal title al-Muʾayyad bi-llah (“Supported by God”), Yusuf consciously evoked the memory of Yusuf I, one of Granada’s most distinguished rulers. In the early months of his rule, he reorganized the administration, distributed offices among supporters, and issued official documents from the Alhambra. Yet stability proved elusive. A new pretender, Ismail (later Ismail III), emerged from the Castilian court, where John II maintained Granadan exiles. Establishing himself in Cambil, Ismail fomented dissent.

Yusuf responded with political maneuvering. He dismissed the vizier ʿAli b. ʿAllaq and appointed a member of the powerful Banu l-Sarraj (Abencerrajes) family, temporarily calming unrest. Once stability returned, however, he reversed course: he arrested key figures, confiscated property, reinstated ʿAli b. ʿAllaq, and launched further campaigns to suppress opposition.

Despite internal instability, Yusuf V achieved notable military successes. Between 1446 and 1447, he recovered several fortresses previously lost to Castile, including hiṣn al-Naŷaš, hiṣn al-Bariŷ, Cortes de Baza, Galera, Castilléjar, Huéscar, and others. Though some identifications remain debated, chroniclers attribute these conquests to his energetic leadership.

When Ismail III seized Granada in early 1446, Yusuf fled to Almería and continued resistance from there. He launched attacks both against the new sultan and along the Castilian frontier. In May 1446, he captured Benamaurel and Benzalema. Later campaigns recovered Arenas, Huéscar, Vélez Blanco, and Vélez Rubio. These operations coincided with dynastic disputes within Castile. Yusuf skillfully exploited internal Castilian conflicts, aligning with rebellious nobles and benefiting from the kingdom’s distractions.

Yusuf’s resurgence ended abruptly in August 1447, when his vizier ʿAli b. ʿAllaq assassinated him in Almería. The motives remain uncertain but likely involved political calculation amid shifting alliances. His death accelerated the collapse of his rival. Within a month, Ismail III fled to Castile, and Muhammad IX once again reclaimed the throne.

== Sources ==
- Catlos, Brian A. (2018). Kingdoms of faith: a new history of Islamic Spain (first ed.). New York: Basic Books. ISBN 978-0-465-05587-6.
- Echevarría, Ana (2009). Knights on the Frontier: The Moorish guard of the Kings of Castile (1410-1467). Boston: Brill. ISBN 978-90-474-2441-3.
- Echevarria, Ana (2018). "Chapter 19. The "Honourable Ladies" of Nasrid Granada". In Woodacre, Elena (ed.). A companion to global queenship. Leeds: ARC Humanities Press. ISBN 978-1-942401-46-9.
- Gallardo, B. B. (2020). "Chapter 1 The Banu Naṣr: The Founders of the Nasrid Kingdom of Granada (Thirteenth–Fifteenth Centuries)". The Nasrid Kingdom of Granada between East and West. Brill.
- Harvey, L. P. (1990). Islamic Spain, 1250 to 1500. Chicago: University of Chicago Press. ISBN 978-0-226-31960-5.
- Mediano, F. (2010). "The post-Almohad dynasties in al-Andalus and the Maghrib (seventh–ninth/thirteenth–fifteenth centuries)". The New Cambridge History of Islam. Vol. 4. Cambridge University Press.
- O'Callaghan, Joseph F. (2014). The last crusade in the West: Castile and the conquest of Granada. Middle Ages series (1st ed.). Philadelphia: University of Pennsylvania Press. ISBN 978-0-8122-4587-5.
- Vidal Castro, Francisco. "Yusuf V". Real Academia de la Historia.

Yusuf V of Granada Nasrid dynasty Died: 1447
Regnal titles
Preceded by Muhammad IX	Sultan of Granada; 1445–1446	Succeeded by Ismail III
