= Abu Abd Allah Muhammad ibn Uthman =

Formerly misidentified as Muhammad X (1415–1454)

Abu Abd Allah Muhammad ibn Uthman (1415–1454) was once thought to be the eighteenth Nasrid dynasty ruler of the Emirate of Granada.

Traditionally, historians have identified Abu Abd Allah Muhammad bin Uthman as the emir of Granada ruling as Muhammad X. This assessment was based on Castilian chronicles which identified him only as el Cojo ("the Lame One"). However, following publication of a new Nasrid-era Arabic source, Ibn c Āṣim's Junnat al-Rida, it has been shown that the eighteenth Nasrid ruler was actually Yusuf b. Ahmad ruling as Yusuf V.

== Sources ==
- O'Callaghan, Joseph F. (2014). The last crusade in the West: Castile and the conquest of Granada. Middle Ages series (1st ed.). Philadelphia: University of Pennsylvania Press. ISBN 978-0-8122-4587-5.
- Vidal Castro, Francisco. "Yusuf V". Real Academia de la Historia.
- Islamic Spain 1250 to 1500 by Leonard Patrick Harvey; University of Chicago Press, 1992
