= Romance of Abenámar =

Medieval Spanish poem

The Romance of Abenámar is a medieval Spanish romance, written as a dialog between the Moor Abenámar and the Catholic King John II of Castile. The poem is a short "frontier romance" in Castilian Spanish with assonant rhyme. The historical events it describes took place in 1431, but the author and date of composition are unknown.

== Historical context ==
The Romance of Abenámar takes place during a period of instability in the Moorish Nasrid dynasty, while the Catholic Christian kings of Castile were seeking greater tribute from and control over the Nasrid kingdom of Granada. Abenámar is either King Yusuf IV (Abenalmao) himself, or one of his courtiers. The poem is a dialogue between Abenámar and King John II of Castile, who wishes for complete possession of Granada.

In 1431, there were several claimants to the throne of Granada. King Muhammad IX had entered Iberia from Tunisia in 1428 or 1429, with the promise of Castilian support in overthrowing Muhammad VIII. However, the Castilian Catholic king John II did not decisively support either, instead playing them against each other to obtain greater tribute and the concession of Granada as a vassal of Castile. Muhammad VIII surrendered in 1429 and was killed in March 1431, leaving Muhammad IX on the throne, but without having reached an agreement with Castile. John II continued to demand greater concessions, and would not offer a permanent peace. Instead, he supported another candidate, Yusuf IV (Ibn al-Mawl, also known as Abenalmao). Yusuf agreed to tribute and to be John's vassal.

On June 27, 1431, Yusuf met with John outside the city of Granada, as they prepared to install Yusuf as king. The poem imagines their dialog as Abenámar honors John, but the city refuses to be possessed by the Catholic king.

The city, however, would become part of a unified and Catholic Spanish kingdom only a generation later, as John's daughter Isabella I of Castile and her husband Ferdinand II of Aragon conquered Granada in 1492.

== Contents ==
The poem opens with John praising the nobility of Abenámar. Although it was written by Castilians, it portrays the Moor favorably and is sympathetic to the Moorish kingdom's fight to remain independent.

As John surveys Granada from a distance he asks Abenámar about the high castles and palaces that he can see inside. Abenámar describes some of the architectural wonders of the Moorish capital, naming in turn the Alhambra, the mosque, the Nasrid palace in the Alixares, the Generalife, and the Red Towers. After seeing Granada and hearing of its wealth, John addresses the city itself and proposes marriage to it, offering Cordoba and Seville as a dowry. However, Granada proudly refuses him, replying "Casada soy, que no viuda; el moro que a mí me tiene, muy grande bien me quería." (I am married, and no widow; the Moor whom I belong to loves me very well.)

== Structure ==
The poem consists of forty-six short lines with assonant rhyme. This rhyme scheme, which matches vowels while ignoring consonants, was common in Spanish poetry of the time. Every second line participates in the rhyme by ending with the vowels ía, a stressed i followed by unstressed a. For example, the sixth and eighth lines end with the words crecida (crescent-shaped) and mentira (lie).
