= Gate of the Pomegranates =

Coordinates: 37°10′33″N 3°35′35″W

- Puerta de las Granadas (Spanish)
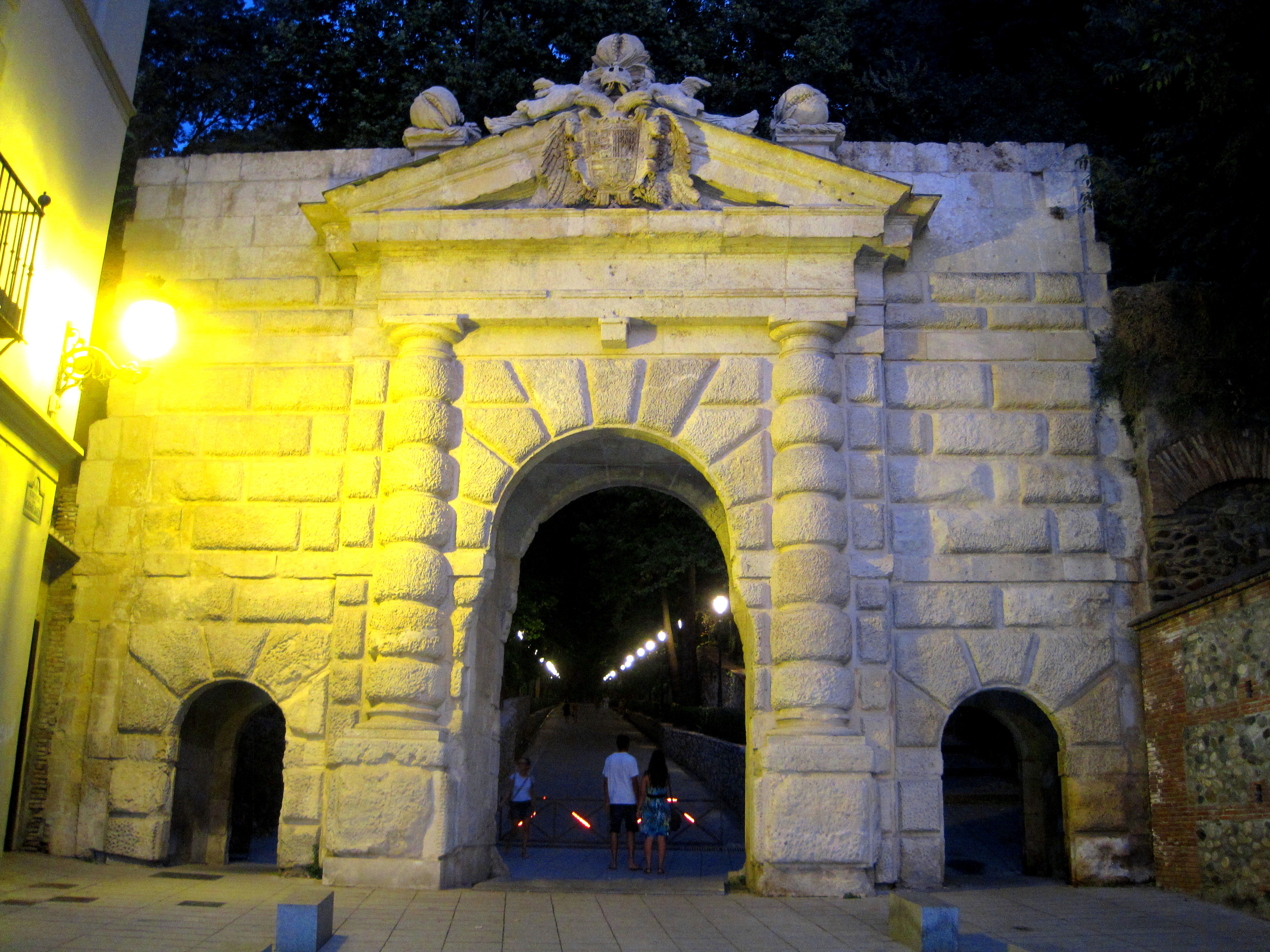

- Location within Spain
- Location: Granada, Spain

Spanish Cultural Heritage
- Official name: Puerta de las "Granadas"
- Type: Non-movable
- Criteria: Monument
- Designated: 1870
- Reference no.: RI-51-0000009

The Gate of the Pomegranates (Spanish: Puerta de las Granadas) is an historical access point of a pathway that leads through the Forest of the Alhambra to the Nasrid palace that is the Alhambra, located in the city of Granada, Spain. The path starts in the city centre, Plaza Nueva, and continues up the Cuesta de Gomérez, before reaching the monument.

== Style ==
The gate was constructed in the style of Roman triumphal arches, with a classic front façade, making it the main entrance to the walled enclosure of the Alhambra. Built during the Spanish Renaissance, under the command of Emperor Charles V, the gate is made out of bonded stone carved with Florentine designs without roughing, which highlights the ashlars of the construction.

== Brief history ==
Construction of the gate began in 1526 to commemorate the visit of Charles I of Spain to Granada after his wedding with Isabel of Portugal, according to the imperial program (Door of Justice, Pilar and Palace of Charles V). The idea was conceived by Luis Hurtado and executed by Íñigo López with help from the architect of the Palace of Carlos V, Pedro Machuca. The gate was built in substitution of the original Islamic gate, the Bib al-Buxar also known as Bib al-Jaudaq, which was a defensive tower that protected the valley located between the hill of the Sabica and the Mauror Mountain. Some of the original Arabic architecture can be seen on the right side of the gate and on its left side is a baroque door to the Palace of the Marquise of Cartagena.

Formally known as the Door of the Gomérez, the Gate of the Pomegranates receives its name from the three large open pomegranates that sit atop the main arch, accompanied by the imperial shield of Charles I of Spain and V of Germany and the allegorical figures of Peace and Abundance, concepts that the government of Charles I promised to contribute to the new lands of Al-Andalus.

The Alhambra Forest can be seen behind all arches of the gate with the right arch leading to Torres Bermejas, the Manuel de Falla Auditorium and the Carmen de los Mártires, while the left side, formerly called Cuesta Empedrada, leads to the southern border of the Alhambra where the Doors of Justice and Doors of the Carts can be found.

The central arch, surrounded by Tuscan semi-columns, provides access to paved footpaths that lead to the Palace of Charles V, the church of Santa Maria de la Alhambra and the Parador Nacional de San Francisco.

On 10 February 1870, it was declared Bien de Interés Cultural as it was deemed an integrated part of the original wall surrounding the Alhambra. The gate is managed by the Direccion del Patronato de la Alhambra y Generalife.

== Bibliography ==
BURÍN, ANTONIO. Artistic and Historical Guide of the City of Granada. Editorial Comares. Granada 1987.

== See also ==
- List of Bienes de Interés Cultural in the Province of Granada
