= List of Bienes de Interés Cultural in the Province of Granada =

This is a list of Bien de Interés Cultural landmarks in the Province of Granada, Spain.

- Alhambra
- Gate of Elvira
- Gate of the "Granadas"
- Castillo de La Calahorra
- Castillo de Salobreña
- Castillo de San Miguel (Almuñécar)
- Church of Saint Peter and Saint Paul
- Gate of Bibrambla o Arco de las Orejas
- Gate of the Pomegranates
