= Yusuf IV of Granada =

Sultan of Granada in 1432

Yusuf IV يوسف الرابع

Sultan of Granada
- Reign: 1432
- Predecessor: Muhammad IX of Granada
- Successor: Muhammad IX of Granada
- Born: 1360s
- Died: 1432
- Dynasty: Nasrides
- Religion: Islam

Yusuf IV (c. 1360s-1432), or Yusuf ibn al-Mawl, was the sixteenth Nasrid ruler of Granada from January to April 1432, during one of the most turbulent periods of Granadan history. A maternal grandson of Muhammad VI, Yusuf IV ousted Muhammad IX and took the throne of Granada with the support of the John II of Castile in return for tribute and vassal status. The tribute and other conditions imposed on Granada were widely unpopular and the emir's support sank quickly. Muhammad IX was soon welcomed back by the populace and quickly overthrew and executed Yusuf.

== Biography ==
Although documentation about Yusuf is sparse, surviving genealogical information and contemporary chronicles allow a reconstruction of his background and brief political career. Unlike most Nasrid emirs, he did not belong to the main agnatic (male-line) branch of the dynasty. His connection to the ruling house was maternal. Yusuf’s mother was a daughter of Sultan Muhammad VI (r. 1360–1362). Through her he was the maternal grandson of that ruler. His father, Muhammad ibn al-Mawl, was a member of the Banū l-Mawl, an influential Andalusi family originally from Córdoba. The family had supported the Nasrid founder in the thirteenth century, settled in Granada, and played a decisive political role. One of its members helped overthrow Muhammad III in 1309 and elevate Nasr to the throne. Though connected to the Nasrid house, his descent through the female line placed him outside the primary succession line, an important factor in evaluating his later elevation.

Since his mother, Muhammad VI’s daughter, must have been born between roughly 1346 and 1362, Yusuf was likely born between 1360 and 1390. Contemporary chronicles describe him as “very old” at the time of his death in 1432, suggesting a birth date in the 1360s.

The first clear references to Yusuf ibn al-Mawl emerge in 1431 amid acute political crisis in Granada. At the time, Muhammad IX ruled the emirate. The execution of his rival, Muhammad VIII, in April 1431 deepened factional tensions within the capital. Meanwhile, Castilian forces under King John II and his powerful constable Álvaro de Luna intensified pressure along the frontier, including a destructive campaign in the Vega de Granada in May 1431.

Opponents of Muhammad IX required a new candidate around whom to rally. Chief among the opposition was the Bannigash family. Despite being styled “legitimists” these opponents selected Yusuf ibn al-Mawl. The choice is notable because other Nasrid princes possessed stronger dynastic claims, including grandsons of Yusuf II who would later reign as Yusuf V and Sa'd. Yusuf ibn al-Mawl’s maternal connection to the ruling branch represented a further deviation from traditional succession. His elevation appears to have been a matter political calculation over dynastic legitimacy. A key role was likely played by Ridwan Bannigaš (known in Castilian sources as Gilayre), who organized support for Yusuf. Unable to overthrow Muhammad IX independently, Ridwan appealed to King John II who was then in Córdoba considering whether to attack Málaga or Granada. Ridwan assured the Castilian king that a pretender,“Don Yuzaf Abenalmao”, would join him and facilitate intervention.

Castile’s strategy of backing rival claimants to weaken Granada was well established. By supporting a dependent emir, John II hoped either to conquer the emirate outright or reduce it to effective vassalage. Despite Nasrid awareness of this policy, internal factionalism repeatedly created openings for Castilian interference.

On June 27, 1431, the Castilian army encamped in the Vega of Granada. Yusuf ibn al-Mawl soon appeared, accompanied by Ridwan and leading supporters. He denounced Muhammad IX as a usurper and offered vassalage to Castile in exchange for military assistance. The decisive encounter occurred on July 1, 1431, at the Battle of La Higueruela, where Nasrid forces were defeated. John II recognized Yusuf as claimant and pledged support.

Yet the Castilian king failed to capitalize fully on his victory. On July 10 he withdrew without having secured Muhammad IX’s submission. Yusuf and his followers retreated with the Castilian army to Córdoba, gathering additional supporters from Granada. John II instructed frontier commanders, including Diego Gómez de Ribera and the Master of Calatrava, Luis de Guzmán, to assist Yusuf’s cause. Castilian pressure, infiltration, and agitation in border districts encouraged several towns to declare for the pretender.

At Ardales on September 16, 1431, Yusuf formally signed a vassalage agreement with Castile. The treaty survives in both Arabic and Castilian versions. It justified rebellion against Muhammad IX on grounds of illegitimacy and condemned the execution of Muhammad VIII and his brother. Ratification was to follow Yusuf’s accession.

In subsequent months additional towns declared for Yusuf. Castilian aid helped expand his position: Archidona and Iznájar surrendered in early December 1431. Yusuf advanced toward Granada. Under mounting pressure, the capital recognized him in late December and Muhammad IX fled the Alhambra.

On December 31, 1431, Yusuf’s supporters entered Granada and seized the Alhambra. On January 1, 1432, Yusuf ibn al-Mawl formally assumed power as Emir Yusuf IV. On January 27, 1432, he ratified the vassalage treaty with John II. The treaty imposed severe conditions. Yusuf IV pledged lifelong vassalage, annual tribute of 20,000 gold dinars, military assistance to Castile, attendance at the Castilian court, release of all Christian captives in Granada, and prohibition of Christian conversion to Islam. In return, Castile promised military protection for Yusuf and his heirs.

These terms generated widespread resentment. The economic burden of tribute was substantial, but the requirement to release Christian captives proved especially disruptive. Captives represented both labor and ransom value; their loss inflicted hardship on many Granadan families. Moreover, perpetual vassalage conflicted with prevailing Islamic political norms. Yusuf IV’s legitimacy, already fragile, eroded rapidly.

Meanwhile Muhammad IX regrouped. After taking refuge in Almería, which remained loyal, he moved to Málaga, where he secured recognition from other towns and districts. Control of the principal ports strengthened his position. He sought diplomatic support from the Hafsid ruler Abu Faris in Tunis and encouragement from Alfonso V of Aragon, who opposed Castilian expansion.

Facing internal unrest and the proximity of his rival in Málaga, Yusuf IV requested Castilian military assistance in February 1432. Response was slow. Meanwhile, Muhammad IX acted decisively, sending a force of approximately one thousand men under his nephew Yusuf ibn Ahmad (later Yusuf V). With covert support within Granada, they gained entry and besieged Yusuf IV in the Alhambra. Much of the capital shifted allegiance.

Castilian forces briefly intervened and won a skirmish outside the city but withdrew, reportedly to seek reinforcements. Their aid proved insufficient to secure Yusuf’s position. The citizens invited Muhammad IX to return. He entered Granada and established himself in the old Zirid citadel while besieging the Alhambra. Forces loyal to him opened the gates from within. Yusuf IV attempted to hide within a concealed alcove in the Alhambra but was discovered after several days. He was executed in mid-to-late April 1432. His reign had lasted less than four months. His supporters in the Bannigash clan fled to Seville.

Yusuf may be the character, Abenamar, in the Romance of Abenamar, a medieval frontier romance describing the meeting with John II.

Yusuf IV of Granada Nasrid dynasty Cadet branch of the Banu Khazraj Died: 1432
Regnal titles
Preceded by Muhammad IX	Sultan of Granada; 1432	Succeeded by Muhammad IX
