= Mohammed VIII =

Mohammed VIII may refer to:

- Muhammed VIII, Sultan of Granada (1411–1431)
- Mohammed VIII of Bornu (1811–1814) of the Sayfawa dynasty
- Muhammad VIII al-Amin (1943-1957), the last bey of Tunisia
