= Muhammad VII =

Muhammad VII may refer to:

- Muhammed VII, Sultan of Granada (1370–1408)
- Muhammad VII al-Munsif (1881–1948)
- Muhammad VII of Bornu (1731–1747) of the Sayfawa dynasty
