= Nasrid raid on Murcia (1392) =

The Nasrid raid on Murcia of 1392 was a localized frontier conflict near Lorca between the Nasrid Kingdom of Granada and the Crown of Castile.

== Background ==
Muhammad VII succeeded to the Nasrid throne in October 1392. At the time, there was a truce with Castile in effect. Since truces were considered personal undertakings by the sovereigns that needed to be confirmed at the start of a reign, the succession of a new ruler often created a situation of increased tension along the border. Muhammad intended to maintain the truce with Castile, while at the same time adopting a more belligerent attitude. With this policy, he sought to take advantage of the minority of Henry III and the divisions it created at the court to strengthen his hand.

== Raid ==
In December 1392, while the truce was still operative, Muhammad launched an algazúa (raid) into Murcia in the vicinity of Lorca. He gave as a pretext that certain Castilian almogávares had violated his border. According to the Chronicle of Henry III and Gil González Dávila, the raiding party consisted of 700 cavalry and 3,000 infantry.

The Nasrid raiders cut down the fields and burned the town of Caravaca while the townsfolk took refuge in the fortress of the Order of Santiago. The adelantado of Murcia, Alfonso Yáñez Fajardo, caught up with the raiders at Nogalte (Nogalete) as they were returning to Granada. He defeated them, put them to flight and recovered their booty. According to the Chronicle, Fajardo had 170 knights and 400 foot soldiers. Gil González calls this "un mediano número de caballeros" ('a modest number of knights') and says that foot soldiers came from the cities of Murcia and Lorca.

== Aftermath ==
When Muhammad learned of the disaster at Nogalte, he broke off ongoing truce negotiations in Granada with envoys from King John I of Aragon and began to prepare a military response. Although he informed the Aragonese that this was directed at Lorca, John suspected that it was directed at Valencia and made preparations for war. Ultimately, truces were signed with both Castile and Aragon.

In Castile, the Nasrid raid of 1392 sparked debate about the royal policy. It was pivotal in inaugurating "the heroic period of the frontier war" as recorded in the romances fronterizos. The most important event of this phase of localized fighting, which left the truces between the monarchs in place, was the Order of Alcántara's crusade of 1394, born directly out of the debates that followed 1392's raid.

The raid was greatly exaggerated in later accounts, such as that of Martín de Cuenca Fernández Piñero (1722), who mis-dated it to 1393. In the 19th century, it was blamed for the loss of the municipal archives of Caravaca.
