= Yusuf II of Granada =

Sultan of Granada from 1391 to 1392

Yusuf II

Sultan of Granada
- Reign: 15 January 1391 – 5 October 1392 (10 Safar 793 – 16 Dhu al-Qa'da 794 AH)
- Predecessor: Muhammad V
- Successor: Muhammad VII
- Born: c. 1356
- Died: 5 October 1392 (age about 36); Granada
- Spouse: Several, names unknown; Khadija (possible)
- Issue: Yusuf III; Muhammad VII; Ali; Ahmad; Ismail III (possible); Umm al-Fath (II)
Names
- أبو الحجاج يوسف بن محمد ʾAbū al-Hajjāj Yūsuf ibn Muḥammad
- Dynasty: Nasrid
- Father: Muhammad V
- Religion: Islam

Political map of the Emirate of Granada

Abu al-Hajjaj Yusuf ibn Muhammad (Arabic: أبو الحجاج يوسف بن محمد; c. 1356 – 5 October 1392) was sultan of the Emirate of Granada, the last Muslim state in the Iberian Peninsula, from January 1391 until his death. He was the 11th sultan of the Nasrid dynasty and the first son of his predecessor, Muhammad V (r. 1354–1359, 1362–1391).

When Yusuf was about three years old, his father was dethroned and the family went into exile in Fez, the capital of the Marinid Sultanate of Morocco. His father regained the throne in 1362 and the young Yusuf was given command of the Volunteers of the Faith, a corps of North African soldiers available to fight for the emirate. He became sultan after his father's death in 1391. Yusuf's government was initially dominated by his minister, Khalid, until Khalid was suspected of conspiring against the sultan and executed. Yusuf then took control of his government and appointed the poet Ibn Zamrak, his father's vizier (whom he had imprisoned), as his vizier in July 1392.

Yusuf continued his father's peace treaty with Granada's neighbour Castile and signed a treaty with another Christian neighbour, John I of Aragon (r. 1387–1396), in August 1392. He died on 5 October 1392, after less than two years on the throne. A medieval Christian writer said that he was killed by a poisoned tunic given to him by the Marinid Sultan Abu al-Abbas Ahmad. Yusuf's death by poisoning is considered plausible by modern historians, but the report's veracity is doubted and may be exaggerated; no other sources corroborate the account. He was succeeded by his son Muhammad VII (r. 1392–1408) and by another son, Yusuf III (r. 1408–1417).

== Birth and family exile ==
Yusuf was the first son of Muhammad V of Granada (r. 1354–1359 and 1362–1391), and the only one born during the first of the sultan's two reigns. Although his date of birth is unknown, historian Francisco Vidal Castro estimated that he was born c. 757 AH or 1356 AD (a few years after his father's accession). Yusuf was about three years old when his father was dethroned on 23 August 1359; a group of men under Muhammad el Bermejo (later Muhammad VI) scaled the walls of the Alhambra that night and enthroned the sultan's half-brother, Ismail II. Yusuf was walking with his father in the Generalife gardens (Jannat al-‘Arīf) just outside the Alhambra complex; this allowed the sultan to escape to Guadix in the eastern part of the emirate before going into exile across the Mediterranean Sea to Fez, the capital of Morocco's Marinid Sultanate. Yusuf was left in Granada, but around 25 November the new sultan allowed him and his mother to join the dethroned sultan in Fez.

Muhammad V returned to al-Andalus on August 1361, creating a rival court in the Marinid Andalusian outpost of Ronda and beginning a civil war against Muhammad VI, who had dethroned Ismail II a year before. Muhammad V, supported by Peter of Castile, gained the upper hand; Muhammad VI fled the Alhambra and sought asylum with Peter on 13 March 1362. Muhammad V entered the abandoned royal palace and retook the throne; Muhammad VI was murdered by Peter on 25 April, and his head was sent to Muhammad V.

== Return to al-Andalus ==
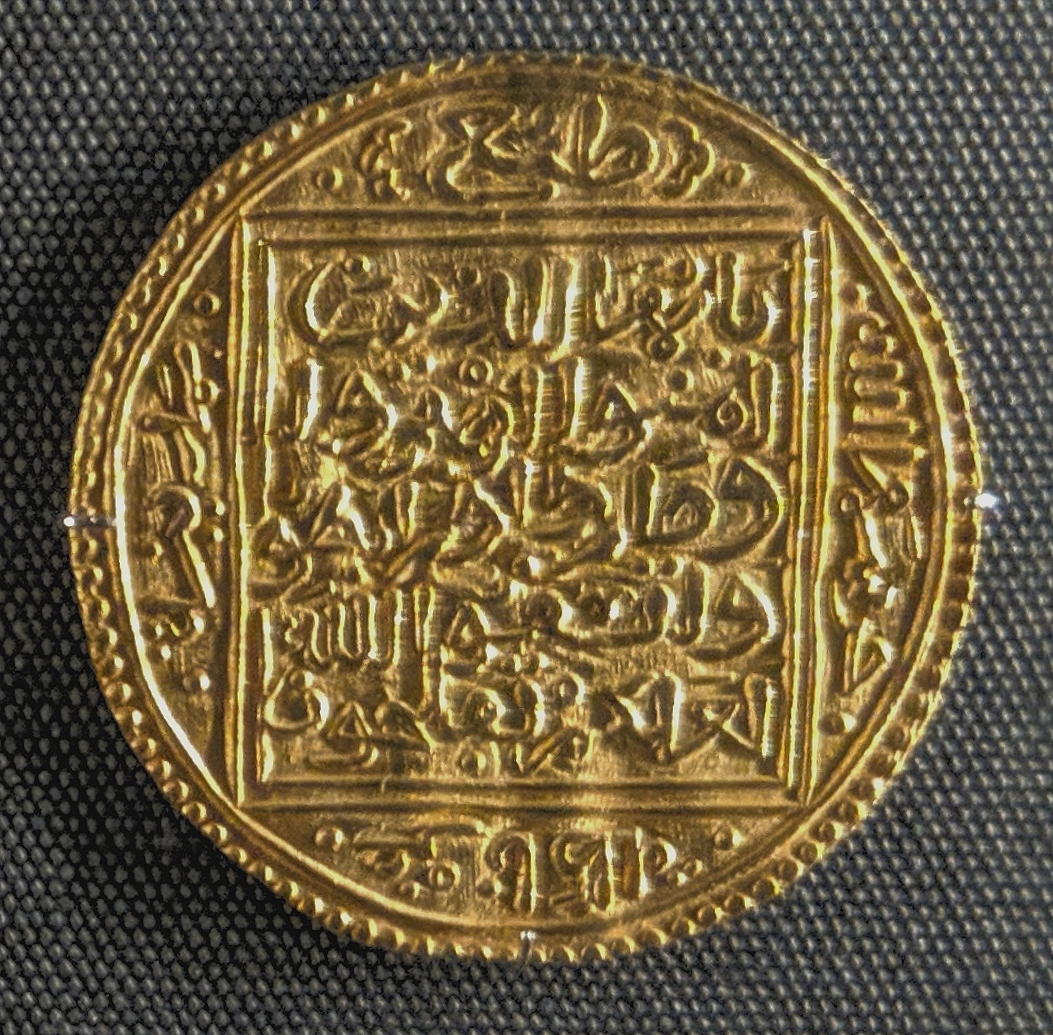
Coin of Muhammad V, Yusuf's father and one of Granada's longest-reigning Nasrid rulers

Yusuf was still in Fez during his father's second accession, and the recently enthroned Marinid Sultan Abu Zayyan Muhammad attempted to use him as a bargaining chip so Muhammad V would return Ronda to him. The Marinids yielded; Yusuf was allowed to return to Granada with his father's vizier, Ibn al-Khatib (who had also been in exile in Morocco), although Ronda remained under Granadan control. Yusuf's party arrived in Granada, the capital city, on 14 June 1362. His brothers, Abu Nasr Sa'd, Nasr (both probably born between 1362 and 1369) and Abu Abdullah Muhammad, were born afterwards.

Yusuf was circumcised in 764 AH (approximately October 1362 to October 1363); this has helped historians determine his birth year, because boys were customarily circumcised at age seven. Muhammad removed Yahya ibn Umar, shaykh al-ghuzat (chief) of the Volunteers of the Faith, from his post on 26 June 1363. The Volunteers were North African soldiers fighting for Granada, and their chief had always been a dissident prince related to the Berber Marinid dynasty; however, the sultan appointed the young Yusuf chief and Sa'd a commander. Yusuf also received a tax-free estate by his father.

Muhammad V presided over one of the dynasty's longest reigns. Around the time that Yusuf reached adulthood, he was detained and summoned to court on the suspicion of rebelling against his father; he was acquitted, however, after an investigation. In 1390, when his father and John I of Castile (r. 1379–1390) signed a treaty that extended peace between their kingdoms, Yusuf and John's son Henry added their signatures. Yusuf was about 35 years old when his father died in January 1391.

== Rule ==
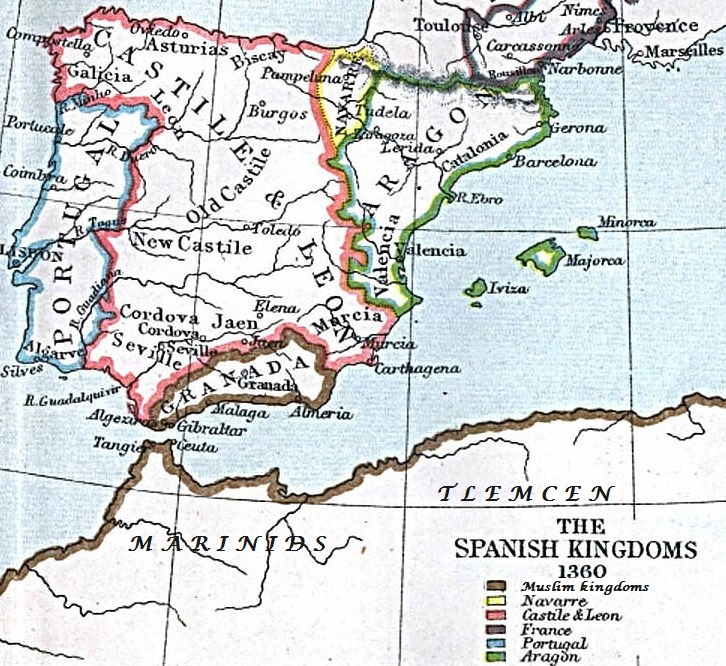
The Emirate of Granada and surrounding kingdoms in 1360

Yusuf II took the throne on 15 January 1391 (10 Safar 793 AH), the day of his father's death, and adopted the laqab (regnal honorific) of al-Mustaghni bi-llah ("He who is satisfied with God"). He sent a letter that day to Alonso Yáñez de Fajardo, the Castilian adelantado of Murcia, confirming the continuation of the truce which Muhammad V had signed with John I in 1390. Although bilateral treaties typically expired on the death of either signatory, the 1390 treaty remained in effect because both successors – Yusuf and Henry III (r. 1390–1406) – had also signed it. Yusuf maintained peace with Aragon, whose King John I had had good relations with Muhammad V. In March 1391, Yusuf sent the Aragonese king a letter notifying John of his father's death and his enthronement; the king replied with the customary condolences, expressing surprise at the sultan's delay in sending the letter.

During the first year of his rule, Yusuf imprisoned the poet Ibn Zamrak (his father's vizier) in an Almerían dungeon. His reign was dominated by Khalid, his father's mawla, (Note: A servant, client or freedman) who became his first minister (al-qaim bi-dawlati-hi, "the officer of his government"). Khalid imprisoned the sultan's three brothers; Yusuf did not hear about them again, and they died in captivity. Yusuf received a report suspecting Khalid of a conspiracy with Yahya ibn al-Saigh, the Jewish royal physician, to poison him. The sultan ordered them both executed; Khalid was bound and hacked to death with a sword in his presence, and Yahya was imprisoned and beheaded (or poisoned).

Yusuf then took control of his government. A few months before his death, he faced another conspiracy led by his son Muhammad (the future Muhammad VII, r. 1392–1408). Their conflict was resolved peacefully with the help of the Marinid sultan Abu al-Abbas Ahmad (r. 1374–1384, 1387–1393), and Muhammad acknowledged his father's authority.

In July 1392, Yusuf restored Ibn Zamrak as vizier. He signed a five-year peace treaty with Aragon on 14 August which was similar to previous treaties. The treaty seemed to favour Aragon's Muslim subjects (mudejares); two weeks later, John I allowed them to appear in public without a distinctive, previously mandatory badge. On 29 August, John wrote a letter authorising the Muslims of Zaragoza to send a representative to the Nasrid court. The letter was never sent, however, probably because of the king's concern that it would provide a pretext for Granada to intervene in his internal affairs.

== Family ==
Yusuf's first son was Yusuf III, and Muhammad VII was born soon afterwards; Abu al-Hasan Ali and Abu al-Abbas Ahmad followed. He also had a daughter, Umm al-Fath, wife of the future Muhammad IX. Historian Bárbara Boloix Gallardo writes that Yusuf sired another sultan, Ismail III of Granada; according to Vidal Castro, however, Ismail's genealogy is unclear. (Note: Ismail III does not always appear in the lists of Nasrid Sultans compiled by modern historians; it is absent from Harvey 1992, pp. 17–19 and Arié 1973, Appendix, Table 1.) Not all his children were full siblings; Muhammad VII was a half-brother of Yusuf III and Umm al-Fath (full siblings, indicating that Yusuf II had more than one spouse). According to Juan de Mata Carriazo's 16th-century History of the Royal House of Granada, "Muhammad Guadix" was the 11th sultan of Granada and died in 1392. He married Khadija, the daughter of Sultan Abu al-Abbas Ahmad II (r. 1370–1394) of the Hafsid Ifriqiya; the marriage produced a son, Yusuf, who would also be sultan. Because Muhammad's death year coincides with Yusuf II's (the 11th sultan), Boloix Gallardo writes that the Christian source misidentified Yusuf II as "Muhammad Guadix" (throwing light on the identity of one of his spouses and the mother of his son, Yusuf III). José Antonio Conde states that Yusuf II married a daughter of the King of Fez sometime after 1375. She was presumably the sister of Abul Abbas Ahmad Mustanzir (whom Muhammad V had installed as Sultan of Morocco in 1374), mother of Muhammad VII and perhaps Abu al-Hasan Ali and Abu al-Abbas Ahmad.

== Death ==
Yusuf died on 5 October 1392 (16 Dhu al-Qa'da 794 AH), aged about 36. The later Castilian Chronicle of John II alleges that he was killed by a poisoned tunic (aljuba) which was among gifts sent by the Marinid Sultan Abu al-Abbas. The allegation was based on a letter by Fernán Sánchez, a Christian who lived in the emirate, during the reign of Yusuf III (r. 1408–1417). Sánchez wrote that he "saw with [his] own eyes" in Granada that the sultan felt unwell immediately after putting on the tunic and "died within thirty days, with his flesh coming off in pieces". No other sources corroborate the story and, since Sánchez wrote many similar accounts of assassinations with poisoned clothing, historian L. P. Harvey says that "one is reluctant to accept the report as true". Another historian, Francisco Vidal Castro, writes that despite the "fantastic" (and possibly altered) detail, assassination by poisoning is plausible. According to Vidal Castro, the Marinid Sultanate is known to have interfered in Granada's affairs; the sultan's son and successor, Muhammad VII, may have conspired with the Marinids or other courtiers to poison his father and seize the throne.

== Bibliography ==
- Arié, Rachel (1973). L'Espagne musulmane au temps des Nasrides (1232–1492) (in French). Paris: E. de Boccard. OCLC 3207329.
- Boloix Gallardo, Bárbara (2013). Las sultanas de la Alhambra: las grandes desconocidas del reino nazarí de Granada (siglos XIII-XV) (in Spanish). Granada: Patronato de la Alhambra y del Generalife. ISBN 978-84-9045-045-1.
- Boloix Gallardo, Bárbara (2015). "El rostro femenino del poder. Influencia y función de la mujer nazarí en la política cortesana de la Alhambra (siglos XIII-XV)". Cuadernos del CEMyR (in Spanish). 23. Centro de Estudios Medievales y Renacentistas de la Universidad de La Laguna: 49–64.
- Conde, José Antonio (1821). Historia de la dominacion de los Arabes en España (in Spanish). Vol. 3. García. p. 166.
- Fernández-Puertas, Antonio (April 1997). "The Three Great Sultans of al-Dawla al-Ismā'īliyya al-Naṣriyya Who Built the Fourteenth-Century Alhambra: Ismā'īl I, Yūsuf I, Muḥammad V (713–793/1314–1391)". Journal of the Royal Asiatic Society. Third Series. 7 (1). London: Cambridge University Press on behalf of Royal Asiatic Society of Great Britain and Ireland: 1–25. doi:10.1017/S1356186300008294. JSTOR 25183293. S2CID 154717811.
- Harvey, L. P. (1992). Islamic Spain, 1250 to 1500. Chicago: University of Chicago Press. ISBN 978-0-226-31962-9.
- Vidal Castro, Francisco. "Yusuf II". Diccionario Biográfico electrónico (in Spanish). Real Academia de la Historia.
- Vidal Castro, Francisco. "Ismail III". Diccionario Biográfico electrónico (in Spanish). Real Academia de la Historia.
- Vidal Castro, Francisco (2004). "El asesinato político en al-Andalus: la muerte violenta del emir en la dinastía nazarí". In María Isabel Fierro (ed.). De muerte violenta: política, religión y violencia en Al-Andalus (in Spanish). Editorial CSIC - CSIC Press. pp. 349–398. ISBN 978-84-00-08268-0.

Yusuf II of Granada Nasrid dynasty Cadet branch of the Banu Khazraj Died: 1392
Regnal titles
Preceded by Muhammad V	Sultan of Granada; 1391–1392	Succeeded by Muhammad VII
