= Muhammad IX of Granada =

Emir of Grenada between 1419 and 1453

Muhammad IX محمد التاسع
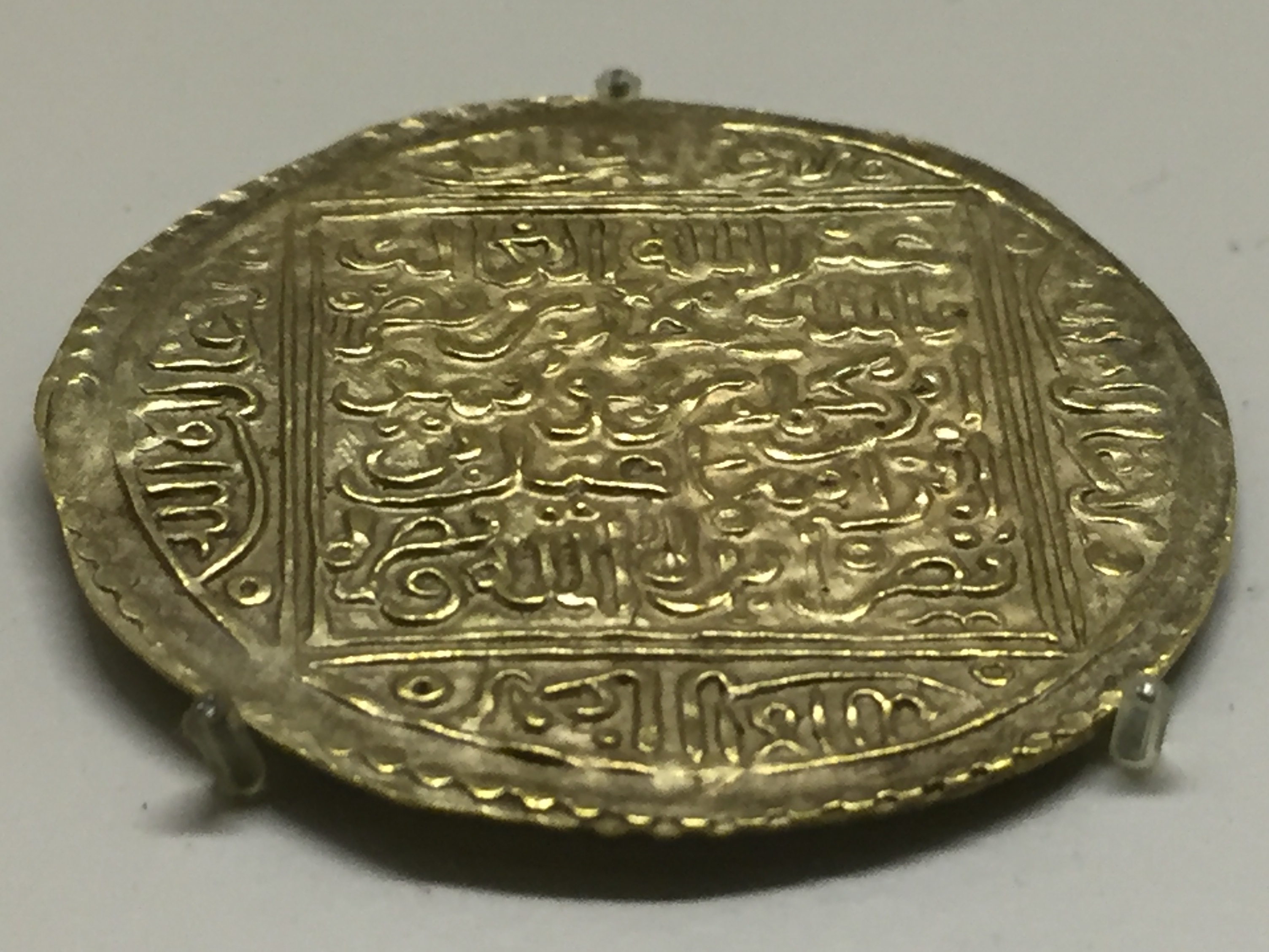
- Gold dobla of Sultan Muhammad IX, minted in Granada between 822 and 825 AH (1419-1431 AD), housed in the National Archaeological Museum of Madrid.

Sultan of Granada (1st reign)
- Reign: 1419–1427
- Predecessor: Muhammad VIII of Granada
- Successor: Muhammad VIII of Granada

Sultan of Granada (2nd reign)
- Reign: 1430–1431
- Predecessor: Muhammad VIII of Granada
- Successor: Yusuf IV of Granada

Sultan of Granada (3rd reign)
- Reign: 1432–1445
- Predecessor: Yusuf IV of Granada
- Successor: Yusuf V of Granada

Sultan of Granada (4th reign)
- Reign: 1448–1453
- Predecessor: Ismail III of Granada
- Successor: Muhammad X of Granada
- Born: 1384
- Died: 1454 (aged 69–70)
- Spouse: Umm al-Fath and Zahr al-Riyad
- Dynasty: Nasrides
- Religion: Islam

Muhammad IX (1384-1453), also known by his Arabic and Castilian nicknames Al-Aysar and El Zurdo ("The Left Handed"), was the fifteenth Nasrid ruler of the Emirate of Granada on the Iberian Peninsula.

Muhammad IX was the longest-ruling and most decisive of the 15th-century Granadan sultans, despite his frequent removals from the throne. He ruled a total of about 28 years across four intervals: 1419–1427, 1430–31, 1432–1445 and 1447–1453. His reign was twice interrupted by other Nasrid factions and twice by the Castilians, who had a policy of destabilizing the kingdom by aiding challengers to the throne. Although Muhammad IX had the support of many of the leading figures in Granada, he did not enjoy widespread popular support, especially in the early years of his reign.

Through lineage and marriage he was closely tied to several prominent Nasrid figures of his era. He was the grandson of Muhammad V and the nephew of Yusuf II. Two wives are known, Zahr al-Riyaḍ and Umm al-Fath. Both women were noted for their political influence, especially Umm al-Fath whom Muhammad IX consulted frequently on matters of state. Muhammad IX had no male heir, just three daughters: Umm al- Fath, married to Muhammad X; Fatima, possibly married to Yusuf V; and ‘Aisha, married to Abu l-Hasan Ali.

He was probably born in Granada around 1384–1385, as suggested by the circumcision ceremony organized for him by his grandfather in 1384. In his youth he was imprisoned in Salobreña, probably after the accession of Muhammad VIII in 1417.

== First reign (1419–1427) ==
Muhammad IX came to power in 1419 through a coup. Discontent with the rule of Muhammad VIII and his vizier led provincial governors and members of the powerful family, Banu al-Sarraj (Abencerrajes), to free Muhammad from Salobreña and proclaim him sultan. Initially the city of Granada resisted their entry, but the conspirators obtained a legal opinion (fatwa) declaring Muhammad VIII’s rule illegitimate because he was underage (he was 8 years old at the time). The capital then admitted Muhammad IX, who secured the Alhambra and imprisoned Muhammad VIII in Salobreña.

Adopting the epithet al-Galib bi-llah (“Victorious by God”), Muhammad IX appointed Abu al-Hajjaj Yusuf ibn al-Sarraj as vizier, strengthening the political prominence of the influential al-Sarraj family. His first reign combined diplomatic caution abroad with instability at home. He maintained truces with Castile, renewing agreements with John II in exchange for tribute. Although frontier skirmishes continued, they did not escalate into full war. Muhammad IX also cultivated ties with North African powers, especially the Hafsid ruler Abu Faris Abd al-Aziz II of Tunis, whose support later proved crucial. In 1419 he unsuccessfully attempted to seize Ceuta from Portugal, reflecting broader concern over Christian expansion along the North African coast.

Internally, revolts posed serious challenges. In Almería a charismatic religious figure known as “the Holy Moor” disrupted order between 1421 and 1426. Another, more dangerous rebellion erupted in Granada under the Sufi leader Yusuf al-Mudajjan, who briefly controlled parts of the capital before being suppressed. These disturbances weakened central authority and exposed factional divisions.

In January 1427, Muhammad IX was overthrown in favor of Muhammad VIII, restored from imprisonment. The deposed ruler fled first to Almería and then to Tunis, where Abū Faris received him and offered support.

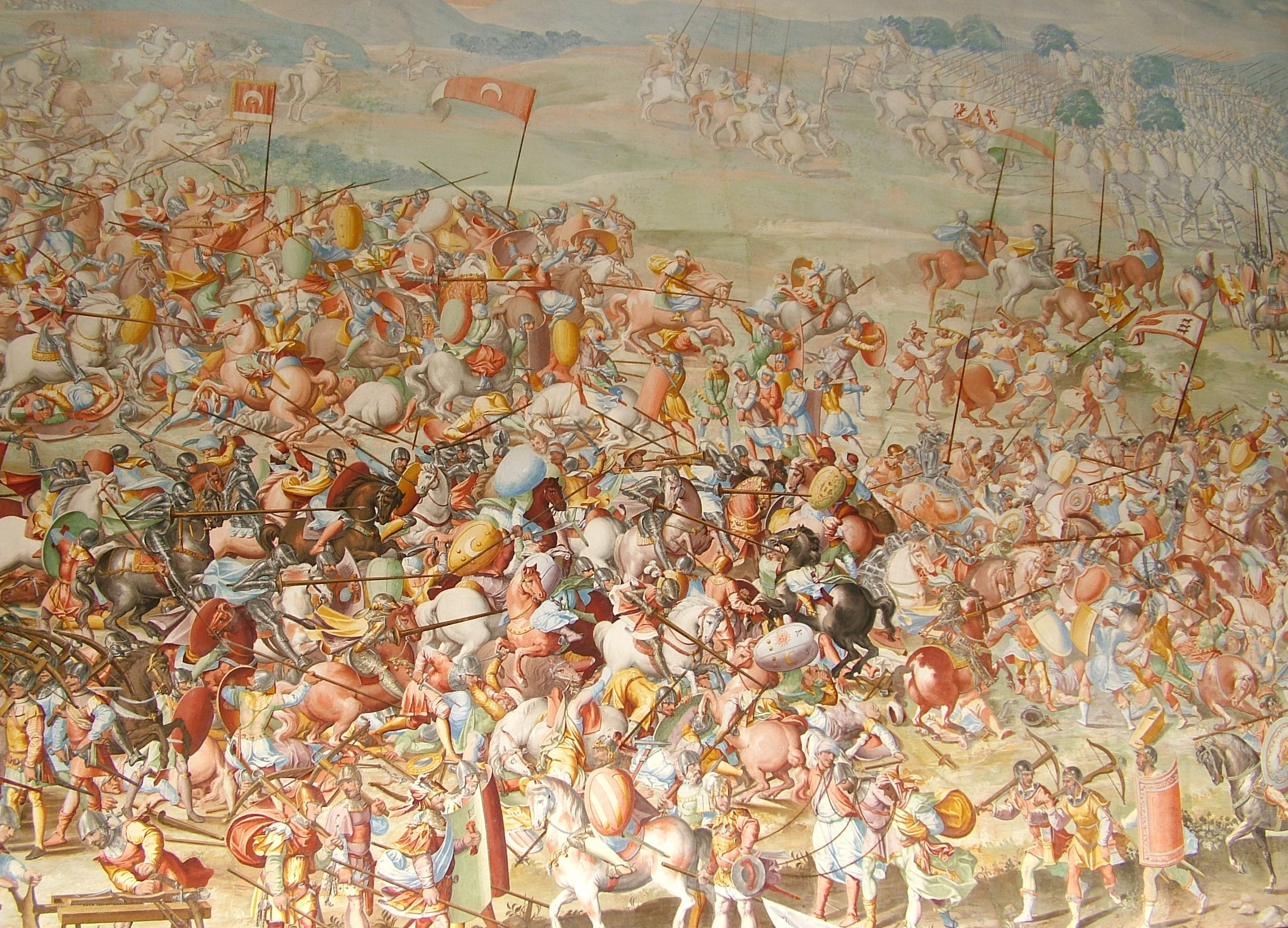
Battle of La Higueruela (1431) between John II of Castile and Muhammad IX, Nasrid Sultan of Granada

== Second reign (1430–1431) ==
Muhammad IX’s exile was brief. Supporters in Granada conspired for his return. With Hafsid backing and Castilian diplomatic maneuvering, he landed near Vera in 1429. Almería and other territories recognized him, initiating civil war. Advancing toward Granada, he besieged the Alhambra, where Muhammad VIII had entrenched himself. After cutting off the water supply, Muhammad IX forced surrender in March 1430 and regained the throne.

His restoration quickly encountered renewed conflict. Seeking peace, he proposed a truce to John II, even offering military aid in Castile’s internal struggles. The Castilian king, however, delayed and ultimately rejected terms while preparing for war and isolating Granada diplomatically.

In 1431 Castilian forces raided Nasrid territory. Fearing renewed conspiracy centered on the imprisoned Muhammad VIII, Muhammad IX ordered his execution, eliminating a rival but further deepening factional resentment. That summer Castile launched a major campaign culminating in a significant Nasrid defeat at the Battle of La Higueruela on July 1, 1431. Although John II supported a rival claimant, Yusuf Ibn al-Mawl (Yusuf IV), Castile failed to secure decisive control. Granada eventually recognized Yusuf IV, forcing Muhammad IX to flee again to Almería late in 1431.

Dissatisfaction with Yusuf IV’s dependence on Castile soon grew. Muhammad IX regrouped in Málaga and other loyal territories. In 1432 his supporters besieged the Alhambra; Yusuf IV was captured and executed. Muhammad IX thus began his longest and most stable reign.

== Third reign (1432–1445) ==
From 1432 to 1445 Muhammad IX presided over the longest phase of his rule. The Banu l-Sarray again occupied key offices. Relations with Castile were dominated by intermittent border warfare. Although neither side launched sustained total war, raids were frequent and costly. Several towns shifted allegiance under pressure. Some eastern frontier communities submitted to Castile to secure favorable terms.

The loss of Huelma in 1438 was a significant setback, though Nasrid forces achieved victories elsewhere, including at Castril. Exhaustion on both sides led to negotiation. In 1439, a three-year truce was concluded in exchange for tribute, captives, and recognition of certain territorial losses. Muhammad IX rejected formal vassalage but accepted pragmatic compromise.

He also sought external alliances. An embassy to the Mamluk sultan al-Ẓahir Jaqmaq in Cairo requested military assistance, but distance precluded direct intervention; only financial aid was provided. A truce extension with Castile was secured in 1443 for three more years.

Internal stability deteriorated when his nephew Yusuf bin Ahmad, El Cojo (the Lame) rebelled. Initially trusted and prominent in military campaigns, Yusuf grew increasingly independent. Civil conflict spread across Málaga and western territories. To prevent prolonged war, Muhammad IX abdicated in 1445 in favor of Yusuf V, (Note: El Cojo was traditionally associated with Abu Abd Allah Muhammad ruling as Muhammad X but after publication of a new Nasrid-era Arabic source, Ibn aṣim's Junnat al-Rida (c. 1450), it has been determined that he is actually Yusuf b. Ahmad, whom the Castilian chronicles refer to simply as "the Lame Infante.") retaining residence in the Alhambra and control of certain territories.

== Fourth reign (1447–1453) ==
Yusuf V was dethroned and assassinated amid continued factionalism. In 1447 Muhammad IX returned to the throne for the fourth time. Lacking a surviving son, he designated Prince Muhammad al-Ṣagir as his heir in an attempt to secure dynastic continuity.

In foreign affairs he adopted a more assertive strategy. Exploiting internal divisions within Castile, he rejected unfavorable truces and conducted vigorous frontier campaigns. Nasrid forces recovered several strongholds and achieved a major victory at Río Verde (Marbella) in 1448, defeating Castilian troops under Juan de Saavedra. The defeat resonated widely and entered Castilian ballad tradition.

Throughout 1448–1449 Nasrid forces raided widely across the frontier, sometimes cooperating with Castilian rebels opposed to John II. However, Castile continued to interfere in Nasrid succession disputes, backing the pretender Ismail III. Ismail briefly seized Málaga in 1450, but Muhammad IX rapidly counterattacked, retook the city, and eliminated his rival.

Further campaigns in 1450–1451 demonstrated continued Nasrid resilience. Yet fortunes shifted in 1452 with the disastrous Battle of Alporchones, where leading Granadan commanders were killed. Under mounting strain, Muhammad IX agreed to a five-year truce with Castile beginning September 1, 1452.

Muhammad IX died in July 1453 at more than sixty-nine years of age, according to an official letter of the grand vizier.

== Sources ==
- Catlos, Brian A. (2018). Kingdoms of faith: a new history of Islamic Spain (first ed.). New York: Basic Books. ISBN 978-0-465-05587-6.
- Echevarría, Ana (2009). Knights on the Frontier: The Moorish guard of the Kings of Castile (1410-1467). Boston: Brill. ISBN 978-90-474-2441-3.
- Echevarria, Ana (2018). "Chapter 19. The "Honourable Ladies" of Nasrid Granada". In Woodacre, Elena (ed.). A companion to global queenship. Leeds: ARC Humanities Press. ISBN 978-1-942401-46-9.
- Gallardo, B. B. (2020). "Chapter 1 The Banū Naṣr: The Founders of the Nasrid Kingdom of Granada (Thirteenth–Fifteenth Centuries)". The Nasrid Kingdom of Granada between East and West. Brill.
- Harvey, L. P. (1990). Islamic Spain, 1250 to 1500. Chicago: University of Chicago Press. ISBN 978-0-226-31960-5.
- Mediano, F. (2010). "The post-Almohad dynasties in al-Andalus and the Maghrib (seventh–ninth/thirteenth–fifteenth centuries)". The New Cambridge History of Islam. Vol. 4. Cambridge University Press.
- O'Callaghan, Joseph F. (2014). The last crusade in the West: Castile and the conquest of Granada. Middle Ages series (1st ed.). Philadelphia: University of Pennsylvania Press. ISBN 978-0-8122-4587-5.
- Vidal Castro, Francisco. "Muhammad IX". Real Academia de la Historia.

Muhammad IX of Granada Nasrid dynasty Cadet branch of the Banu Khazraj Born: 1396 Died: 1454
Regnal titles
Preceded by Muhammad VIII	Sultan of Granada; 1419–1427	Succeeded by Muhammad VIII
Preceded by Muhammad VIII	Sultan of Granada; 1430–1431	Succeeded by Yusuf IV
Preceded by Yusuf IV	Sultan of Granada; 1432–1445	Succeeded by Yusuf V
Preceded by Ismail III	Sultan of Granada; 1448–1453	Succeeded by Muhammad X
