= Yusuf III of Granada =

Emir of Granada from 1408 to 1417

Yusuf III يوسف الثالث

Sultan of Granada
- Reign: 1408–1417
- Predecessor: Muhammad VII
- Successor: Muhammad VIII
- Born: July 16, 1376
- Died: 9 November 1417 (aged 41)
- Dynasty: Nasrides
- Father: Yusuf II of Granada
- Religion: Islam

Yusuf III (July 16, 1376 – November 9, 1417) was the thirteenth Nasrid ruler of the Emirate of Granada from 1408 to 1417.

He was initially designated heir to the throne by his father, Yusuf II. His succession was thwarted when his half-brother Muhammad VII seized power in 1392 and confined him for more than fifteen years in the castle of Salobreña. During this long imprisonment, Yusuf devoted himself to scholarship and poetry. Upon the death of Muhammad VII in 1408, he was released and proclaimed emir under the regnal title al-Nasir li-Din Allah. Once on the throne, he relied on the support of his powerful chamberlain Abu l-Surur Mufarrij and quickly moved to stabilize the political situation he had inherited.

Yusuf III's reign was characterized by diplomatic pragmatism, intermittent military conflict, and cultural flourishing at the Nasrid court. Although he suffered a major setback with the loss of the strategic city of Antequera to Castile in 1410, he succeeded in negotiating a series of truces with Castile and Aragon that ensured relative stability along the frontier for much of his rule and even beyond his death. At the same time, he confronted challenges in North Africa, most notably the rebellion of the Marinid garrison of Gibraltar, which he eventually recovered in 1414 after a prolonged siege. A cultivated ruler and accomplished poet, Yusuf fostered an active literary circle at the Alhambra and composed a substantial body of poetry. Despite recurring illness and personal tragedies within his family, he governed for nearly a decade and died in 1417 at the age of forty-one, leaving a kingdom that, despite recent territorial losses, enjoyed a measure of internal stability and diplomatic balance.

== Early life ==
Yusuf was born on July 16, 1376, during the height of the Nasrid dynasty under the reign of his grandfather Muhammad V. His early life was spent in an environment of courtly magnificence and intellectual vitality.

Yusuf was the eldest of five brothers and had one sister, Umm al-Fath, whose judgment he later respected deeply. His father, Yusuf II, designated him heir apparent upon his accession in 1391. His status as the eldest son and his intellectual promise strengthened this choice. However, his half-brother, Abu ʿAbd Allah Muhammad (later Muhammad VII), resented the succession arrangement and unsuccessfully rebelled against their father. Shortly afterward, Yusuf II died suddenly, possibly by poisoning, and Muhammad VII seized the throne in 1392, displacing the legitimate heir.

Upon his brother's accession, Yusuf's fortunes changed dramatically. He was removed from his position as crown prince and confined in the coastal castle of Salobreña, a Nasrid residence and fortress that also functioned as a prison for high-ranking captives. There he spent almost sixteen years in confinement. His imprisonment was intended to eliminate any potential dynastic challenge to Muhammad VII. The years of isolation profoundly shaped him. During this prolonged captivity he devoted himself to poetry and intellectual pursuits, producing literary works that reflected longing for Granada, grief for his father, indignation at injustice, and meditations on fate and divine will.

== Reign (1408–1417) ==
His liberation came unexpectedly in 1408 when Muhammad VII died, possibly from poison. Christian sources recount that the ruling emir had ordered Yusuf's execution on his deathbed to secure succession for his own son, but his execution was delayed long enough to allow Yusuf's supporters to liberate him. Whether or not the anecdote is accurate, Muhammad VII's death enabled Yusuf's supporters to proclaim him emir. The architect of his release was the powerful official Abu l-Surur Mufarrij, a freedman of Christian origin who soon became his principal adviser. On May 13, 1408, at nearly thirty-two years of age, Yusuf III was proclaimed emir and adopted the laqab al-Nasir li-Din Allah (“Defender of the Religion of God”).

Yusuf III's accession required swift consolidation. He appointed Abu l-Surur Mufarrij as hajib (grand vizier) and cemented ties by marrying his vizier's daughters. His reign began under delicate circumstances, as frontier tensions with Castile were acute and internal loyalties uncertain. Nonetheless, he adopted a conciliatory stance, refraining from reprisals against those who had supported his brother and even extending favor to Muhammad VII's children. Both Muslim and Castilian sources portray him as prudent, gentle, and inclined toward peace.

His reign initially focused on diplomacy. Within days of his accession, he notified the Castilian authorities of the change in rule and sought to continue the existing truces. Through skilled negotiation, truces were renewed and extended multiple times between 1408 and 1410. Although frontier incidents persisted, these were generally contained. His diplomatic efforts produced a pattern of renewable truces that stabilized relations with Castile for most of his reign and, significantly, continued beyond his death.

Peace, however, was interrupted by a major Castilian offensive culminating in the siege of Antequera in 1410. Anticipating conflict, Yusuf III ordered preemptive raids, including attacks from Ronda against Zahara de la Sierra and other frontier positions. Meanwhile, the Castilian regent Ferdinand (later Ferdinand I of Aragon) laid siege to Antequera in April 1410 with extensive resources. Yusuf concentrated Granadan forces near Archidona under the command of his brothers Abu l-hasan Ali and Abu l-Abbas Ahmad. An engagement on May 6, 1410, ended in defeat for the Nasrids. Despite determined resistance, including heroic action by the jurist Ibn asim, the city ultimately fell after a five-month siege. The loss of Antequera in September 1410 was a significant blow, depriving Granada of a key defensive stronghold that controlled key approaches to Málaga.

Despite this setback, Yusuf III avoided a prolonged war. Further diplomatic efforts secured a truce for sixteen months in November 1410. Ferdinand's subsequent accession to the Aragonese throne in 1412 reduced pressure on Granada. Truces were renewed repeatedly through 1426, often for extended periods of two or three years. Though occasional skirmishes occurred, the frontier remained largely stable.

Relations with Aragon were generally cordial. The truce with Ferdinand I was maintained, and under Alfonso V informal relations continued. The relative stability permitted initiatives such as inviting Mudéjars from Aragon to emigrate to Granada, presenting the Nasrid realm as a haven for Muslims under Christian rule.

Internally, his reign was characterized by relative prosperity. He minted gold dinars in his name and undertook construction and renovation projects in the Alhambra complex, notably the refurbishment of the Palacio del Partal Alto and border fortresses of Moclín. He traveled extensively throughout his territories for inspection, administration, and leisure, reinforcing central authority.

While the Christian frontier stabilized, a serious challenge arose from the Marinid Sultanate of Fez. In 1410, the Marinid garrison of Gibraltar rebelled against Nasrid authority and submitted to the Marinid sultan Abu Saʿid ʿUthman III. Yusuf III responded with a prolonged siege of Gibraltar lasting nearly four years. The Rock's formidable fortifications and Marinid reinforcements made recapture difficult. Yusuf personally oversaw aspects of the campaign and composed poetry reflecting the struggle.

At the same time, he attempted to weaken Fez by supporting a rival claimant, al-Saʿid, whom he dispatched with military support to the Maghrib in 1410–1411. Initial successes, including the capture of Tangier, demonstrated Nasrid influence across the Strait. Eventually, however, al-Saʿid died, and accommodation was reached between Granada and Fez. Gibraltar was finally recovered in 1414, when Prince Abu l-hasan ʿAli entered the fortress. The restoration of Gibraltar represented a major diplomatic and military success, reaffirming Nasrid control of a strategically critical point.

Yusuf III also maintained contacts with other North African polities, including Tunisia and Tlemcen, reinforcing Granada's Mediterranean diplomatic network. In 1415, a Portuguese fleet appeared in the Strait of Gibraltar and captured Ceuta. Though the Nasrids feared an attack on Gibraltar or the Andalusian coast, the threat passed. By then, Yusuf was suffering recurring illness. He had experienced serious health crises earlier, including one in 1411 and another in 1415 requiring surgery.

Despite deteriorating health, he continued to intervene in Maghribi affairs, dispatching another pretender toward Fez in 1417. Soon afterward, while in Almuñécar overseeing these matters, he died on November 9, 1417, at the age of forty-one. His body was transported discreetly to Granada and buried in the Nasrid royal cemetery near the Alhambra's main mosque. After the Christian conquest in 1492, his remains were reportedly transferred to Mondújar.

== Family ==
Yusuf's family life was marked by tragedy. Shortly after his accession he married, but his first wife and their infant son died soon after childbirth. Subsequent marriages produced several children, including Muhammad VIII, who would succeed him. He also experienced the loss of another son during a plague. A serious personal and political loss was the death of his brother and principal military lieutenant, Abu l-hasan Ali in 1416. The emir mourned him deeply; the prince had played a central role in frontier defense and state stability.

== Poetry ==
Yusuf was a cultured man, and his literary talent and poetry were notable. He is considered to be among the best Andalusian poets of the 15th century, along with Ibn Furkun and al-Basti. After his release from prison, he created a large and prolific literary court in the Alhambra. Numerous poems were dedicated to him, both by his official poet and private secretary, Ibn Furkun, and by more than a dozen other authors.

The poems composed by Yusuf III formed a large collection, that was published twice in the 20th century. In addition, Yusuf III is the author of a book dedicated to the life and work of the prime minister Ibn Zamrak, who served his grandfather Muhammad V, his father Yusuf II and his brother Muhammad VII.

== Sources ==
- Catlos, Brian A. (2018). Kingdoms of faith: a new history of Islamic Spain (first ed.). New York: Basic Books. ISBN 978-0-465-05587-6.
- Echevarría, Ana (2009). Knights on the Frontier: The Moorish guard of the Kings of Castile (1410-1467). Boston: Brill. ISBN 978-90-474-2441-3.
- Echevarria, Ana (2018). "Chapter 19. The "Honourable Ladies" of Nasrid Granada". In Woodacre, Elena (ed.). A companion to global queenship. Leeds: ARC Humanities Press. ISBN 978-1-942401-46-9.
- Gallardo, B. B. (2020). "Chapter 1 The Banu Nasr: The Founders of the Nasrid Kingdom of Granada (Thirteenth–Fifteenth Centuries)". The Nasrid Kingdom of Granada between East and West. Brill.
- Harvey, L. P. (1990). Islamic Spain, 1250 to 1500. Chicago: University of Chicago Press. ISBN 978-0-226-31960-5.
- Mediano, F. (2010). "The post-Almohad dynasties in al-Andalus and the Maghrib (seventh–ninth/thirteenth–fifteenth centuries)". The New Cambridge History of Islam. Vol. 4. Cambridge University Press.
- O'Callaghan, Joseph F. (2014). The last crusade in the West: Castile and the conquest of Granada. Middle Ages series (1st ed.). Philadelphia: University of Pennsylvania Press. ISBN 978-0-8122-4587-5.
- Vidal Castro, Francisco (2008). "Yusuf III". Real Academia de la Historia (in Spanish).

Yusuf III of Granada Nasrid dynasty Born: 1376 Died: 1417
Regnal titles
Preceded by Muhammad VII	Sultan of Granada; 1408–1417	Succeeded by Muhammad VIII
