= Ismail III of Granada =

Sultan of Granada (r. 1446–1447)

Ismail III

Sultan of Granada
- Reign: 1446–1447
- Predecessor: Yusuf V of Granada
- Successor: Muhammad IX of Granada
- Born: unknown
- Died: June 30, 1450
- House: Nasrid dynasty

Abū l-Walīd Ismail III (died 30 June 1450) was the eighteenth Nasrid ruler of the Emirate of Granada.

Information about Ismail's life and genealogy is scarce. Although his precise lineage remains uncertain, his close kinship with the Nasrid dynasty is confirmed by the title arráez, reserved for royal relatives, and by his designation as “infante” in Castilian chronicles. A Castilian document suggests he was the uncle of Yusuf V, implying descent from the line of Muhammad V through one of his sons or siblings. Earlier historiography conflated him with Yusuf V, but following publication of a new Nasrid-era Arabic source, Ibn c Āṣim's Junnat al-Rida, it has been shown that they are two different sultans.

For some extended time period, Ismail resided at the Castilian court of John II of Castile, where exiled Granadan nobles often entered the monarch's service. Castile's policy of harboring Nasrid dissidents created a pool of potential claimants to the throne of the Alhambra. Ismail's first bid for power came in 1445, amid the instability that followed the deposition of Muhammad IX by Yusuf V. Backed by John II, Ismail advanced into frontier territory between Castile and Granada and established himself at Cambil, seeking to foment rebellion in Granada. Yusuf V, however, defused the crisis through political concessions and compelled Ismail to withdraw.

A second opportunity arose in February 1446 when the governor of Guadix invited him to intervene. With local support, Ismail entered Guadix; within days Yusuf V abandoned Granada. In February 1446, Ismail ascended the throne as Ismail III. His position was precarious from the outset. Both Muhammad IX, entrenched at Salobreña with Abencerraje backing, and Yusuf V, based in Almería, contested his rule. Though Castilian assistance was provided, Yusuf V achieved notable military successes in 1446–1447, recovering several frontier strongholds. Yusuf's assassination in August 1447 removed one rival, yet the following month Muhammad IX regained Granada, forcing Ismail once more into Castilian exile. His reign had lasted roughly a year and a half and depended heavily on Castilian protection and vassalage.

Castile's inability to contain renewed Nasrid offensives led John II to sponsor Ismail's return in 1449–1450, aiming either to restore him or to provoke civil war. Establishing himself at Comares and later seizing Málaga in April 1450, Ismail received a five-year truce from Castile intended to consolidate his authority. Yet Granada's elites and religious scholars, wary of a ruler perceived as a Castilian client, remained loyal to Muhammad IX. Muhammad quickly recaptured Malaga, forcing Ismail to retreat to the alcazaba of Gibralfaro. Abandoned by his supporters, Ismail capitulated and two days later, on 30 June 1450, he was executed. He was reportedly buried in the Nasrid dynastic cemetery within the Alhambra.

Ismail III of Granada Nasrid dynasty Died: 1450
Regnal titles
| Preceded by Yusuf V | Sultan of Granada; 1446–1447 | Succeeded by Muhammad IX |
