= Castillo de Salobreña =

Fortification in Granada, Spain

Coordinates: 36°44′37″N 3°35′22″W

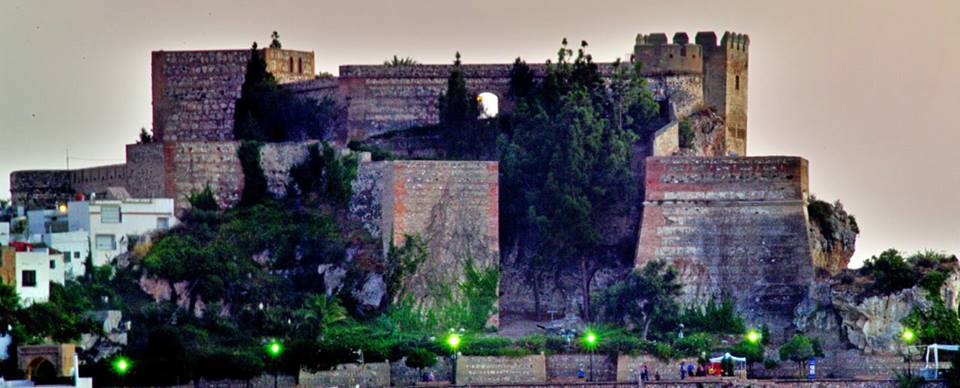
Castillo de Salobreña

Castillo de Salobreña is located in Salobreña, in the province of Granada, Spain. The existence of a known fortification in Salobreña dates from the 10th century. The current structure which was built during the Nasrid dynasty. Trapezoidal in shape, it has four towers. It was declared a Bien de Interés Cultural monument in 1993.

The castle became an important strategic holding in the 14th and 15th centuries. It was a summer residence for the Granada monarchs, and was used on various occasions as a prison where dethroned sultans and other politically dangerous members of the royal family were held. Several Nasrid sultans were imprisoned there, including Yusuf III, Muhamad VIII, Muhammad IX, and Sa'd.
