= Cambil =

Cambil, Spain
- city
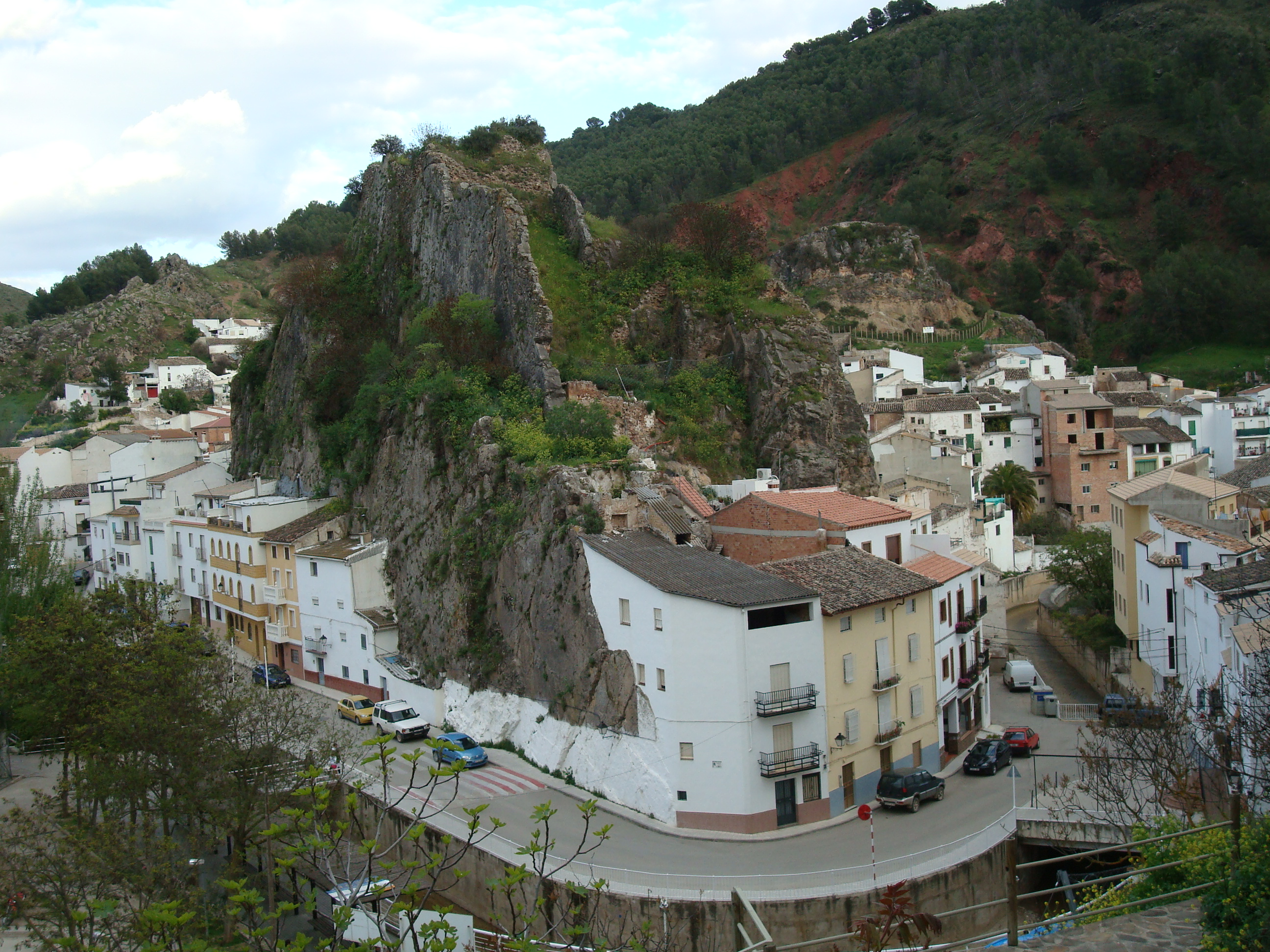

- Coat of arms

- Location in the Province of Jaén Cambil (Andalusia) Cambil (Spain)
- Coordinates: 37°40′N 3°34′W
- Country: Spain
- Autonomous community: Andalusia
- Province: Jaén
- Municipality: Cambil

Area
  - Total: 140 km^{2} (54 sq mi)
- Elevation: 822 m (2,697 ft)

Population (2025-01-01)
  - Total: 2,654
  - Density: 19/km^{2} (49/sq mi)
- Time zone: UTC+1 (CET)
  - Summer (DST): UTC+2 (CEST)

Cambil is a town located in the province of Jaén, Spain. According to 2024 INE figures, the town had a population of 2,632 inhabitants.

== See also ==
- List of municipalities in Jaén
