= Muhammad VII of Granada =

Sultan of Granada from 1392 to 1408

Muhammad VII

Sultan of Granada^{[a]}
- Reign: 3 October 1392 – 13 May 1408
- Predecessor: Yusuf II
- Successor: Yusuf III
- Born: c. 1377
- Died: 13 May 1408 (aged 37–38)
Names
- Abu Abdallah Muhammad VII ibn Yusuf
- House: Nasrid dynasty
- Father: Yusuf II
- Religion: Islam

Notes
- a. In addition to sultan, the titles of king and emir (amir) are also used in official documents and by historians.

Muhammad VII (Arabic: محمد السابع; c. 1377 – 13 May 1408), reigned 3 October 1392 – 13 May 1408, was the twelfth Nasrid ruler of the Muslim Emirate of Granada in Al-Andalus on the Iberian Peninsula. He was the son of Yusuf II (r. 1391–1392) and grandson of Muhammad V (r. 1354–1359, 1362–1391). He came to the throne upon the death of his father. In 1394, he defeated an invasion by the Order of Alcántara. This nearly escalated to a wider war, but Muhammad VII and Henry III of Castile were able to restore peace.

In 1404–1405, Muhammad VII concluded a treaty of friendship with Martin I of Aragon and engaged Charles III of Navarre in talks, thwarting Henry III's attempt to enlist those two monarchs as allies against Granada. In 1406, he and Henry III renewed their truce, but it was overshadowed by Muslim raids—possibly not authorized by Muhammad VII—on Castilian territories. Henry III was now intent on war against Granada, but on 25 December 1406 he died. Henry's 1-year-old son John II became king with his uncle Ferdinand and mother Catherine as regents. Ferdinand marched against Granada's western territories in September 1407 and took Zahara de la Sierra. Meanwhile, Muhammad VII conducted raids and sieges on his northeastern frontiers.

On April 1408, Muhammad VII and Ferdinand agreed to a seven-month truce. However, on 13 May, Muhammad VII died. His older brother succeeded him as Yusuf III and extended the truce until April 1410, after which hostilities resumed between Granada and Castile.

== Background ==
A map of the Emirate of Granada, indicating relevant towns and cities

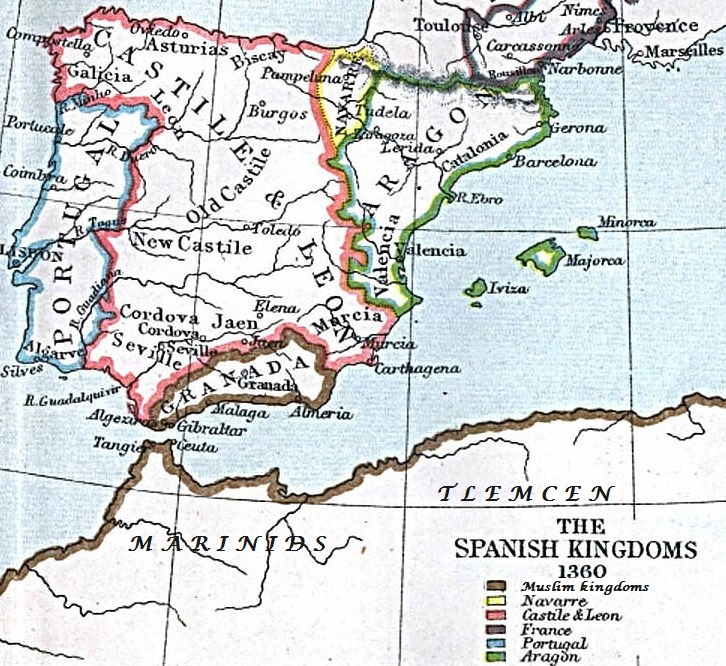
Granada and the surrounding kingdoms

Muhammad VII was the son of Yusuf II, who was briefly the Sultan of Granada between 1391 and 1392, and through his father, the grandson of the previous sultan, Muhammad V (reigned 1354–1359 and 1362–1391). He had an older brother, Yusuf (the future Sultan Yusuf III), who was imprisoned in Salobreña at the time of Muhammad VII's accession, as a result of involvement in a conspiracy.

There is a scarcity of Muslim historical sources on events during Muhammad VII's reign. Most of the available information come from Christian sources and therefore relates to his interactions with Christian kingdoms in the Iberian peninsula.

== Reign ==
=== Accession ===
Muhammad VII came to the throne after the death of his father Yusuf II on 3 October 1392 (16 Dhu al-Qidah 794 AH). On his accession, he appointed Muhammad al-Hammami as his vizier or chief minister. He also freed Ibn Zamrak, Muhammad V's vizier and a famous poet, who had been imprisoned by Yusuf II. Muhammad VII appointed Ibn Zamrak as the royal katib, or secretary, but he was assassinated in the summer of 1393 and replaced by Abu Bakr Muhammad ibn Asim. At the beginning of his rule, he launched a raid on Murcia, despite his father's truce with Castile. He soon after pledged peace with both his Christian neighbours: Henry III of Castile and John I of Aragon.

=== Crusade of 1394 ===
In 1394, Martín Yáñez de la Barbuda (or Martín Yáñez "de Barbudo" in some sources), the master of the military Order of Alcántara and a vassal of the king of Castile, organized a crusade against Granada. Despite attempts by Henry III and some Castilian nobles to stop him, Martín proceeded and his forces were enlarged by the people of Córdoba who supported the crusade. Martín and his forces entered Granadan territory on 26 April 1394 and marched towards its capital.

Muhammad VII sent emissaries to Henry III complaining about this violation of their truce, and Henry III replied that he desired peace and that the crusade was being carried out without his permission. Muhammad VII then mobilized his army and easily defeated Martín's forces. Among the survivors of the Castilian force, 1,200 were captured and 1,500 escaped to Alcalá la Real. Muhammad VII lost 500 foot soldiers. Martín was killed in the fighting and as a sign of displeasure Henry III nominated a member of the rival Order of Calatrava to be the new master of Alcántara.

After the failed crusade, tensions were high and there were fears that there would be an all out war between Granada and the Christian kingdoms. Henry III went to the south and Martín I of Aragón strengthened the defenses of Valencia, both in anticipation of an invasion. Muhammad VII prepared for war, but he too desired peace and in November asked for the truce to be extended. No country wished to escalate the conflict, so an outright war was averted.

=== Renewal of conflict ===
Despite the mutual desire for peace between Muhammad VII and Henry III, conflict continued along the border thanks to rogue forces on both sides. In May 1397, a group of Franciscan friars entered Granada in an attempt to convert the people to Christianity. Muhammad VII forbade such activities, and when they persisted, he had them whipped. When they continued to preach, Muhammad VII ordered them executed and had their bodies dragged through the streets.

In addition to this proselytisation incident, raids and skirmishes were increasingly common on the frontiers. Both authorities found it difficult to prevent unauthorized raids, and once the raids had been carried out, it proved difficult to restore the peace without losing face. In one raid, some Granadans went as far as Cartagena on the Murcian coast. An even larger raid took place in 1405. On the eastern front, Muslim attacks against Vera and Lorca were repulsed, but the invaders captured Ayamonte, a Castilian castle on Granada's western border. Henry III sent an emissary, Gutierre Diaz, to the Granadan court to protest.

Ibn Iyas, the 15th century Egyptian historian mentions in his magnum opus بدائع الزهور في وقائع الدهور “in this year - 1405 - the Sultan of Granada sought help from Fes thus 4,000 soldiers gathered at Cueta and a large fleet was prepared to cross to Gibraltar. However, in a naval battle between the Castilian navy and the Muslim vessels, the Castilians emerged victorious either sinking or capturing the vessels with their crew and property. This incident greatly increased the morale of the Castilians in this particular conflict with Granada.”

=== Diplomatic maneuvering ===
Meanwhile, Granada, Aragon, Castile, and Navarre (a small Christian kingdom in the north of the peninsula) were engaged in diplomatic communications. In 1404, Granada and Aragon conducted talks in Barcelona. At the same time, Henry III proposed a meeting at Logroño with Martín I of Aragon and Charles III of Navarre to build an anti-Granadan coalition. However, Charles III of Navarre decided to help Granada instead. His kingdom was small, like Granada, and he was worried about the growth of Castilian power. Navarre traditionally had a good relationship with its Muslim minorities, which may have influenced Charles' diplomatic posture. Charles III wrote to "my brother" Muhammad VII telling him of the upcoming Logroño summit against Granada and promising to keep him informed of the outcome. He also sent three ships loaded with wheat, as well as 300 siege machines to help Granada against a potential invasion. Granada-Navarre communications were impeded by their geographical separation—Navarre was in the north of the peninsula while Granada was in the south, and Castilian territories lay between them. A Navarrese ambassador, travelling to Granada via Castile disguised as a merchant, was intercepted by Alfonso Fernández of Aguilar in Alcala de Real. This put an end to Granada-Navarre communications and caused Henry III to cancel the Logroño meeting.

Meanwhile, Martin I of Aragon, occupied on his problems in Sicily and Sardinia, was also uninterested in a war against Granada. Instead, Muhammad VII and Martin I agreed to a treaty of friendship on 4 May 1405. The treaty allowed commerce and prisoner exchanges between the two states. In addition, Muhammad VII would supply Aragon with 400 to 500 knights and pay their cost of between 2,840 and 3,540 doblas per month. In return, Aragon provided Granada with 4 or 5 galleys crewed by 30 crossbowmen and 220 seamen each, whose costs were also paid by Granada at 900 doblas per galley per month. These forces were to be used by Granada in the event of a war, other than a war against Castile, which was considered Aragon's friend. This treaty was similar to the 1376 treaty between Aragon and Granada.

Finally, Granada and Castile concluded a two-year truce in Madrid on 6 October 1406 after a long negotiation. Commerce was to be reopened, and frontier judges were appointed to resolve border conflicts. Each side agreed not to allow their territories to be used to attack the other, and not to give asylum to rebels or corrupt officials attempting to flee the other's jurisdiction.

=== War against Castile ===
As the truce concluded, some Muslim forces conducted large-scale attacks in the area around Jaén, including raids on Quesada and Baeza. Castilian troops under Pedro Manrique engaged the Muslims at the inconclusive Battle of Collejares. Given the lack of Muslim sources, it is difficult to know the motivation behind these attacks and whether Muhammad VII instructed or authorized them. Historian L. P. Harvey opined that due to both sides' inability to control all of their forces, the raids were likely conducted by rogue elements. However, with heavy Castilian losses, the truce was no longer tenable and Henry III prepared for a war against Granada.

Henry III blamed Muhammad VII for the breakdown of the truce and summoned his Cortes to Toledo in December 1406. While negotiating the Cortes' support for war, Henry III became ill and died on 25 December. He was succeeded by his 1-year-old son John II. Henry's brother Ferdinand, the future king of Aragon, who had been representing Henry III during his illness, took up the regency jointly with Henry's widow, Catherine of Lancaster. The Cortes went ahead, and approved funding of 45,000,000 maravedíes for the campaign.

The balance of power in the upcoming war was against Granada. Castile's power had been growing, and it enjoyed demographic superiority over the much smaller Granada. In addition, Granada, thanks to Muhammad V's policy of independence and of severing ties with North African Muslim states, could not hope for major aid from the Muslims across the sea. Technological developments in artillery as a siege weapon also weighed against Granada, which was expected to be mostly on the defensive in a war against Castile.

Muhammad VII struck first, in late August, besieging Jaén on the north-eastern frontier and plundering nearby Bedmar. A Castilian reinforcement forced him to break the siege. In February 1408, he besieged the castle of Alcaudete, between Jaén and Alcalá la Real. His forces fired cannons against the castle and attempted to scale the walls, nearly succeeding in taking it. After four days and after losing 2,500 men he abandoned the siege.

Meanwhile, on 7 September 1407 Ferdinand marched against Ronda, in Granada's western territories. While Ronda was too strongly defended to be directly assaulted, he attacked the smaller castles surrounding it. Zahara de la Sierra was the first target, and Ferdinand laid siege on 26 September. In earlier times, Zahara had been very defensible, but Ferdinand's three cannons made short work of the defenses, knocking down towers and making breaches in the wall. With no relief force expected, the castle surrendered on 30 September. Another castle, Ortejícar, fell on 12 October. Ferdinand had also been besieging Setenil since 5 October, which held out despite heavy bombardment. With food dwindling, troops deserting and winter approaching, Ferdinand abandoned the siege on 25 October and returned to Seville.

Frontier skirmishes and pillaging continued in the following weeks. Muhammad VII, outnumbered and unlikely to receive external help, requested a truce in April 1408. Ferdinand himself was under pressure from his Cortes because of Muhammad VII's attacks against Castilian towns on the frontier. A truce was agreed, to last from 15 April until 15 November 1408.

== Death ==
Muhammad VII died on 13 May 1408 and was replaced by his older brother, Yusuf III. According to a story, which Harvey states "has every appearance of a fiction," just before his death Muhammad ordered the execution of Yusuf. Yusuf asked the executioners for a chance to play a last game of chess. According to this story, he managed the make the game last so long that before it finished Muhammad VII died and Yusuf's supporters rescued him from prison and put him on the throne.

Muhammad VII's death invalidated the truce, but Yusuf III negotiated an extension to last until April 1409, later extended to August 1409 and then April 1410. After this truce expired, hostilities between Castile and Granada commenced once more.

== Assessment and reputation ==
Muhammad VII abandoned the policy of pursuing peace championed by his grandfather Muhammad V. He did not shy away from war and led multiple raids himself. However, the period of his rule marked the increasing dominance of Castile vis-a-vis Granada. Granada could no longer rely on organized support from North African Muslims, even though a small number of religiously-motivated fighters did cross the strait. In contrast, Castile grew stronger and its manpower started to recover after the end of the Black Death. Castile's increased use of artillery as an offensive weapon, which was itself increasing in effectiveness, gave it an advantage over Granada, which largely fought a defensive war. Muhammad VII's rule also saw the start of a border conflict between frontiersmen from each side, which the central authorities found difficult to control. The conflict often took the form of raids for little benefit except heroism; these were the subject of the famous Castilian border ballads (romances fronterizos). During his reign Granada lost further territory, including Zahara de la Sierra.

Muhammad VII of Granada Nasrid dynasty Cadet branch of the Banu Khazraj Born: 1370 Died: 1408
Regnal titles
Preceded by Yusuf II	Sultan of Granada; 1392–1408	Succeeded by Yusuf III
