= Ibn Zamrak =

14th-century Arab Andalusian poet and statesman

- بو عبد الله محمد بن يوسف بن محمد بن أحمد الصريحي
- Born: 1333; Granada, Al-Andalus
- Died: 1393 (aged 59–60)
- Occupations: Poet, Statesman
- Writing career
- Notable work: Poems decorating the Alhambra

Ibn Zamrak (Arabic: ابن زمرك) (also Zumruk) or Abu Abduallah Muhammad ibn Yusuf ibn Muhammad ibn Ahmad ibn Muhammad ibn Yusuf al-Surayhi, (1333–1393) was an Arab Andalusian poet and statesman from Granada, Al-Andalus. Some of his poems still decorate the fountains and palaces of the Alhambra in Granada.

== See also ==
- Court of the Lions

== Sources ==
- "Biography of Ibn Zamrak", in: The Encyclopaedia of Islam.(2), iii, pp. 972–973, article by F. de la Granja
- "The Eye of Sovereignty: Poetry and Vision in the Alhambra's Lindaraja Mirado" by D. Fairchild Ruggles, in: Gesta, Vol. 36, No. 2, Visual Culture of Medieval Iberia (1997), pp. 180–189
- García Gómez, Emilio (1905-1995), Ibn Zamrak el poeta de la Alhambra, Granada : Patronato de la Alhambra, 1975
- Le poete vizir Ibn Zamrak: du faubourg d' Al baycine au palais de l'Alhambra, by Hamdan Hadjadji, 2005
- Ibn Zamrak al-Gharnāṭī, 733-796 H/1333-1393 M : sīratuhu wa-adabuh, by Aḥmad Salīm Ḥimṣī, Bayrūt : Mu'assasat al-Risālah; Ṭarābulus, Lubnān : Där al-Īmān, 1985.
