= Muhammad VIII of Granada =

Sultan of Granada (1417–1419, 1427-1429)

Muhammad VIII محمد الثامن

Sultan of Granada
- Reign: 1417–1419 (1st reign)
- Predecessor: Yusuf III
- Successor: Muhammad IX
- Reign: 1427–1429 (2nd reign)
- Predecessor: Muhammad IX
- Successor: Muhammad IX
- Born: 1410; Alhambra
- Died: 1431 (aged 20–21)
- Dynasty: Nasrides
- Father: Yusuf III
- Mother: Umm al-Fath (I)
- Religion: Islam

Abu Abd Allah Muhammad VIII (1410-1431) was a Nasrid ruler of the Emirate of Granada. He was also known as "al-Saghir" or "el Pequeno" (the Little One), a reference to his youth when he took the throne. His two brief reigns (1417–1419; 1427–1430) took place amid intense dynastic factionalism and external pressure from Castile and Aragon. The son of Yusuf III, he ascended the throne as a minor under the regency of the vizier al-Amīn but was deposed in 1419 by his kinsman Muhammad IX with the backing of powerful aristocratic factions, notably the Banu l-Sarraj.

Restored to power in 1427 amid economic strain and dissatisfaction with tribute payments to Castile, Muhammad VIII sought to consolidate support through administrative appointments and renewed truces, while navigating the rival ambitions of John II of Castile and Alfonso V of Aragon, both of whom exploited Granadan instability. Renewed civil war in 1429 enabled Muhammad IX’s return from exile. After a siege of the Alhambra, Muhammad VIII surrendered and was imprisoned in Salobreña. In 1431 he and his brother were executed on the orders of Muhammad IX, eliminating a persistent rival but deepening factional divisions within the Nasrid state.

== Birth and family ==
Although Arabic chronicles do not record Muhammad VIII’s exact date of birth, references to the births of his siblings help to establish it with considerable precision. He was born after his elder sister (November 1409) and before his younger brother (June–July 1411). Therefore, his birth must have occurred between mid-August and late October 1410. This chronology corresponds with Christian accounts stating that he was eight years old in March 1419, when he was first deposed.

He was a son of Yusuf III (r. 1408–1417). His mother, Umm al-Fath was the daughter of Abu l-Surur Mufarrij, a freedman of Christian origin who had aided Yusuf III during an earlier imprisonment and subsequently rose to high office as hajib (chamberlain or grand vizier). After Yusuf III's first wife died in 1409, Umm al-Fath became his consort and later played an active political and diplomatic role, particularly during her son’s second reign.

In October–November 1415 Yusuf III held an elaborate court ceremony in which Muhammad was formally named as heir. The festivities, which also included a circumcision ceremony for the royal sons, were marked by lavish displays of wealth and largesse toward elites and commoners alike, reinforcing dynastic legitimacy.

== First reign (1417–1419) ==
Yusuf III died on 9 November 1417 at Almuñécar. His body was transported overnight to Granada and buried shortly after the ʿĪd al-Fiṭr celebrations. Muhammad VIII, then only seven years old, was proclaimed emir at the Alhambra. He adopted the laqab (honorific title) al-Mutamassik bi-Allah (“He Who Clings to God”).Because of his minority, effective authority rested with the grand vizier al-Amīn.

One of the new regime’s first acts was to confirm the truce with Castile concluded under Yusuf III, set to expire in April 1419. Negotiations with Aragon also took place. Although Alfonso V of Aragon signed a treaty in 1418, it was rejected in Granada after it emerged that the Nasrid envoy had conceded unfavorable terms, including the release of captives without ransom. The envoy was imprisoned, and relations with Aragon remained unsettled.

Within a year, dissatisfaction with the vizier’s dominance coalesced among sectors of Granada society, notably the military chiefs of Íllora and Guadix. They sought an alternative ruler and rallied behind Muhammad ibn Naṣr, a grandson of Muhammad V and cousin of Yusuf III, he was being held in Salobreña. Supported by the influential Banu l-Sarraj (later known as the Abencerrajes), the conspirators freed him from prison and proclaimed him sultan as Muhammad IX al-Aysar (“the Left-Handed”).

The rebels secured a fatwa from Granada’s jurists declaring Muhammad VIII’s reign invalid due to his minority and alleged incapacity. Granada opened its gates to the pretender, and al-Amīn surrendered. The vizier was executed shortly thereafter on the order of Mohammad IX's wife, Zuhr al-Riyad. In March 1419 Muhammad VIII was imprisoned in Salobreña, ending his first reign after approximately sixteen months.

=== Political instability ===
The deposition of Muhammad VIII failed to restore stability to Granada. Instead, the emirate descended into a protracted cycle of coups and factional infighting that severely eroded central authority. Rivalries between dynastic branches and competing aristocratic factions, most notably the Banu l-Sarraj clan (the Abencerrages) and their opponents, intensified. This internal fragmentation left Granada increasingly vulnerable to the predatory interests of Castile and Aragon.

Economic hardships further exacerbated the political discord. Large tribute payments to Castile strained the royal treasury, ultimately leading to a significant currency devaluation in 1425. When diplomatic efforts to renew long-standing truces faltered, the threat of war loomed. These conditions enabled supporters of Muhammad VIII to rally around him as a viable alternative to Muhammad IX.

== The Second Reign (1427–1430) ==
On January 9, 1427, a successful uprising in Granada toppled Muhammad IX and restored Muhammad VIII to the throne. Now approximately sixteen years old, the young Sultan assumed the laqab (honorific title) al-Ghanī bi-Allah ("He Who Is Content with God"). By adopting the same title used by the illustrious Muhammad V, he likely intended to signal a revival of dynastic prestige and stability.

Upon his restoration, Muhammad VIII moved quickly to consolidate power. He appointed loyalists to key administrative offices and relied heavily on his cousins, Yusuf and Saʿd (both of whom would later become sultans), to secure his faction's grip on the government. Records from 1427 confirm his active, direct involvement in the day-to-day governance of the realm.

=== Foreign policy and financial strain ===
Foreign relations remained the Sultan's most pressing challenge. In February 1427, he secured a two-year truce with Castile, though the peace came at a high price: substantial tribute payments that forced the Sultan to sell off portions of the royal patrimony, including lands in Gor, by early 1428.

Despite these formal truces, the frontiers remained volatile. King John II of Castile adopted an opportunistic strategy, preparing for open conflict while subtly stoking Nasrid internal divisions. Although John II initially rejected an extension of the truce in late 1428, his own political tensions with Aragon forced a temporary suspension of hostilities against Granada.

== Deposition and death ==
Meanwhile, relations with Aragon were deceptively cordial. While Muhammad VIII and his mother maintained regular correspondence with Alfonso V and Queen Maria, the Aragonese king was playing a double game. Alfonso simultaneously assisted the supporters of the deposed Muhammad IX, granting them safe passage and facilitating their leader’s return from exile in Tunis, where he had been under the protection of Sultan Abu Faris.

In 1429 Muhammad IX returned to al-Andalus with armed support. Almería and other regions quickly recognized him. As civil war resumed, defections weakened Muhammad VIII’s forces. He retreated to the Alhambra, where he withstood a siege for several months. Both claimants sought Castilian backing, offering concessions and even vassalage. John II delayed intervention, seeking maximum advantage from Nasrid disunity.

Ultimately, besieging forces cut the Alhambra’s water supply. In March 1430, Muhammad VIII surrendered and was again confined in Salobreña, along with his brother Abu l-hasan ʿAlī. Even in captivity, Muhammad VIII remained a focal point for opposition to Muhammad IX. Supporters appealed to Castile in April 1430, and John II signaled willingness to assist in restoring him, continuing his policy of fomenting division within Granada.

Perceiving the persistent threat, Muhammad IX acted decisively. In late April 1431 he ordered the execution of Muhammad VIII and his brother in Salobreña. The act eliminated a rival claimant but deepened factional animosities.

Muhammad VIII left two young sons, born during his second reign. Muhammad IX retained custody of them and later designated one, also named Muhammad, as heir. This child would briefly rule as Muhammad X (1453–1454, 1455).

== Sources ==
- Catlos, Brian A. (2018). Kingdoms of faith: a new history of Islamic Spain (first ed.). New York: Basic Books. ISBN 978-0-465-05587-6.
- Echevarría, Ana (2009). Knights on the Frontier: The Moorish guard of the Kings of Castile (1410-1467). Boston: Brill. ISBN 978-90-474-2441-3.
- Echevarria, Ana (2018). "Chapter 19. The "Honourable Ladies" of Nasrid Granada". In Woodacre, Elena (ed.). A companion to global queenship. Leeds: ARC Humanities Press. ISBN 978-1-942401-46-9.
- Gallardo, B. B. (2020). "Chapter 1 The Banu Naṣr: The Founders of the Nasrid Kingdom of Granada (Thirteenth–Fifteenth Centuries)". The Nasrid Kingdom of Granada between East and West. Brill.
- Harvey, L. P. (1990). Islamic Spain, 1250 to 1500. Chicago: University of Chicago Press. ISBN 978-0-226-31960-5.
- Mediano, F. (2010). "The post-Almohad dynasties in al-Andalus and the Maghrib (seventh–ninth/thirteenth–fifteenth centuries)". The New Cambridge History of Islam. Vol. 4. Cambridge University Press.
- O'Callaghan, Joseph F. (2014). The last crusade in the West: Castile and the conquest of Granada. Middle Ages series (1st ed.). Philadelphia: University of Pennsylvania Press. ISBN 978-0-8122-4587-5.
- Vidal Castro, Francisco. "Muhammad VIII". Real Academia de la Historia.

Muhammad VIII of Granada Nasrid dynasty Cadet branch of the Banu Khazraj Born: 1411 Died: 1431
Regnal titles
Preceded by Yusuf III	Sultan of Granada; 1417–1419	Succeeded by Muhammad IX
Preceded by Muhammad IX	Sultan of Granada; 1427–1429	Succeeded by Muhammad IX
