= Nasrid dynasty =

Sunni Muslim dynasty in Spain (1232–1492)

Nasrid dynasty بنو نصر
- Parent house: Banu Khazraj
- Country: Emirate of Granada (1232–1492)
- Founded: 1232; 794 years ago
- Founder: Muhammad I of Granada
- Final ruler: Muhammad XI of Granada
- Titles: Sultan
- Deposition: 2 January 1492; 534 years ago (Treaty of Granada)

The Nasrid dynasty (Arabic: بنو نصر banū Naṣr or بنو الأحمر banū al-Aḥmar; Spanish: Nazarí) was an Arab dynasty that ruled the Emirate of Granada from 1232 to 1492. It was the last Muslim dynasty in the Iberian Peninsula and of al-Andalus. Twenty-three sultans ruled Granada from the founding of the dynasty in 1232 by Muhammad I until 1492, when Muhammad XI surrendered all lands to Isabella I of Castile. Today, the most visible evidence of the Nasrid dynasty is the Alhambra palace complex built under their reign.

== Historical background ==
The dynasty founded by Muhammad I of Granada held a territory that included Granada, Jaén, Almería, and Málaga. Valencia, Játiva, and Jaén were conquered by Christians during the campaigns of the Reconquista and for the most part, the Nasrids were made into tribute-paying vassals from 1243. Granada continued as a center of Islamic culture. The Nasrids later formed alliances with the Marinids of Fez, who acted as both protectors against the Reconquista and rivals seeking to dominate Granada. Conversely, the Zianids of Tlemcen became their primary political and cultural allies in countering Marinid influence.

Nasrid crafts like textile work such as ceramic overglaze used techniques from 9th century Baghdad and were applied to make lusterware, first in Málaga, Murcia, and Almería, and then by the 15th century in Manises. This style of pottery produced first under Muslim patronage, then Christian, influenced the later style of colorful and glazed Italian ceramics known as maiolica. Throughout the 14th century, the Nasrids are noted for their palace architecture like the Alhambra, which was a product of the efforts of Ismail I and Muhammad V.

In 1469, Ferdinand II of Aragon married Isabella I of Castile, resulting in the union of the Christian kingdoms of Castile and Aragon. The monarchs shared a common cause of conquering the last Muslim kingdom on the Iberian Peninsula. During the time the Christians were launching a campaign against the Emirate of Granada that would effectively end the Nasrid dynasty, the Nasrids were engaged in a civil war over the throne of Granada. When Abu l-Hasan Ali, Sultan of Granada, was ousted by his son Muhammad XI, Abu l-Hasan Ali retreated to Málaga and civil war broke out between the competing factions. Christians took full advantage of this and continued capturing Muslim strongholds. Muhammed XI was caught by Christian forces in 1483 at Lucena, Córdoba. He was freed after he swore an oath of allegiance to Ferdinand II of Aragon and Isabella I of Castile. Abu l-Hasan Ali finally abdicated in favor of his brother Muhammad XII, known as Al-Zaghal (the valiant), and a power struggle with Muhammad XI continued. Al-Zaghal prevailed in the inner struggle but was forced to surrender to the Christians. Muhammad XI surrendered Granada to Ferdinand and Isabella in 1492 and was given a lordship in the Alpujarras mountains, but instead took financial compensation from the Spanish crown to leave the Iberian Peninsula. The remaining Muslim population was given the status of mudéjar.

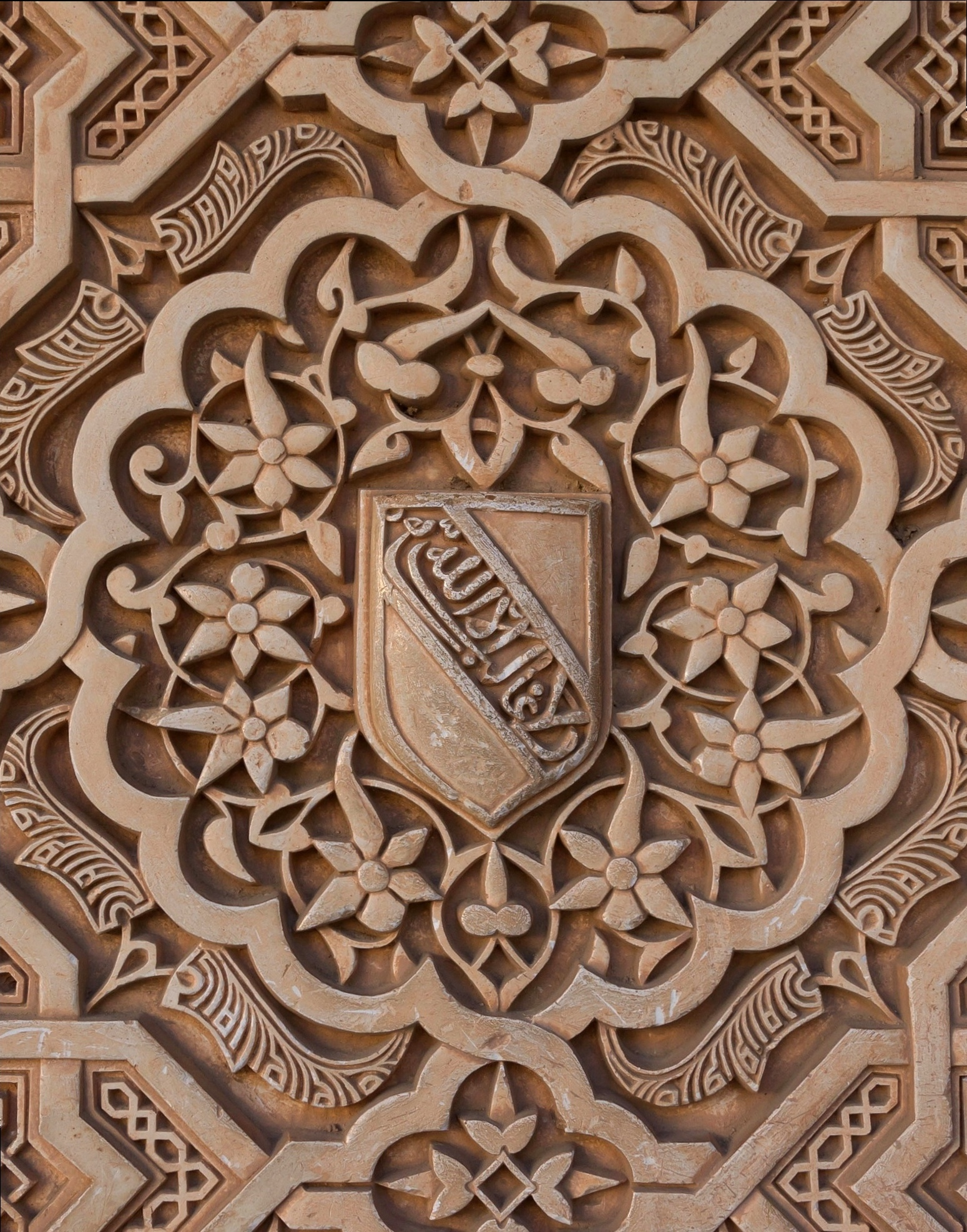
Coat of Arms of the Emirate of Granada on a wall in the Alhambra, Nasrid dynasty (1232–1492)

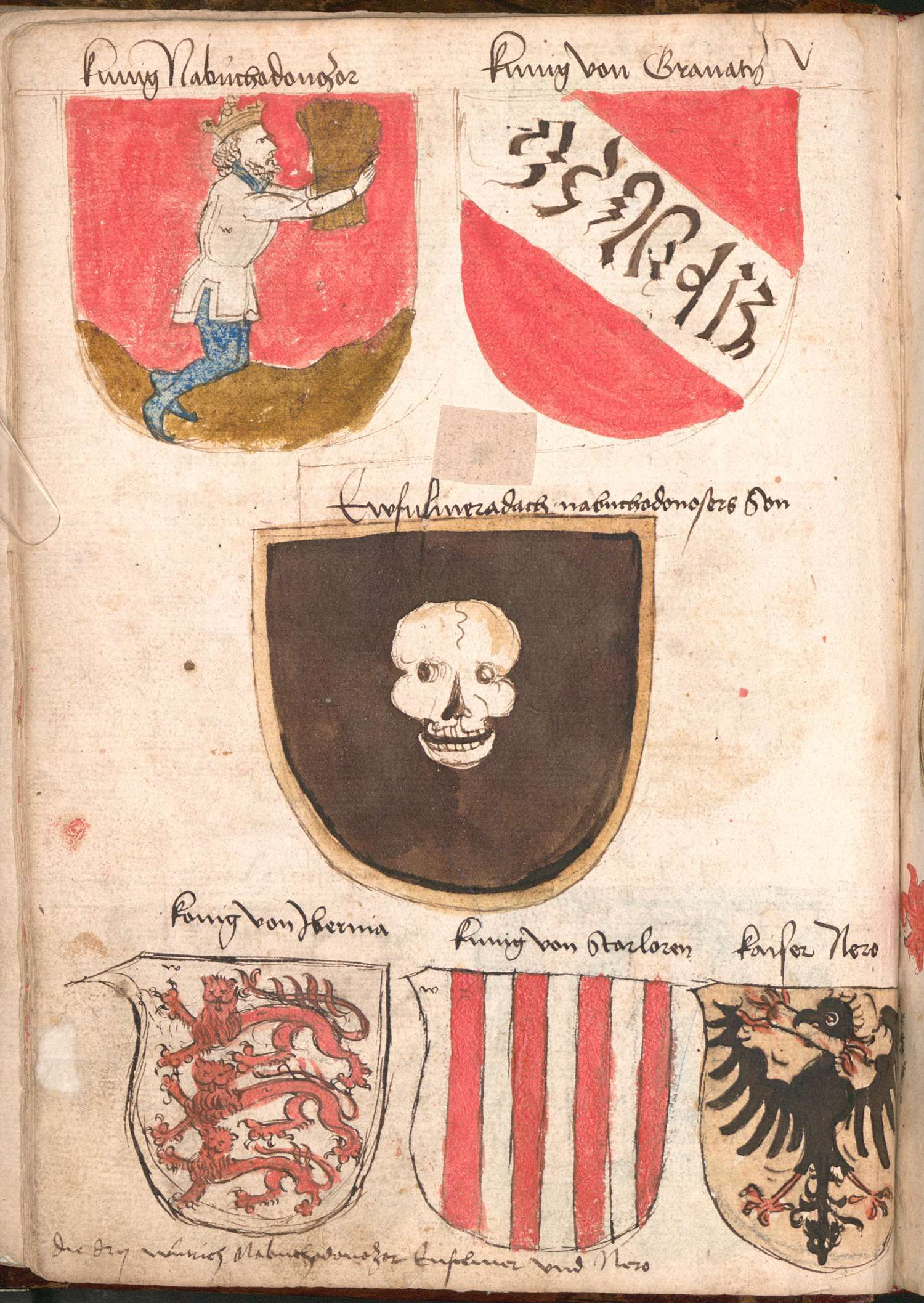
Contemporary coat of arms (upper right) of the Nasrid dynasty of Granada with garbled Arabic inscription (Wernigerode Armorial).

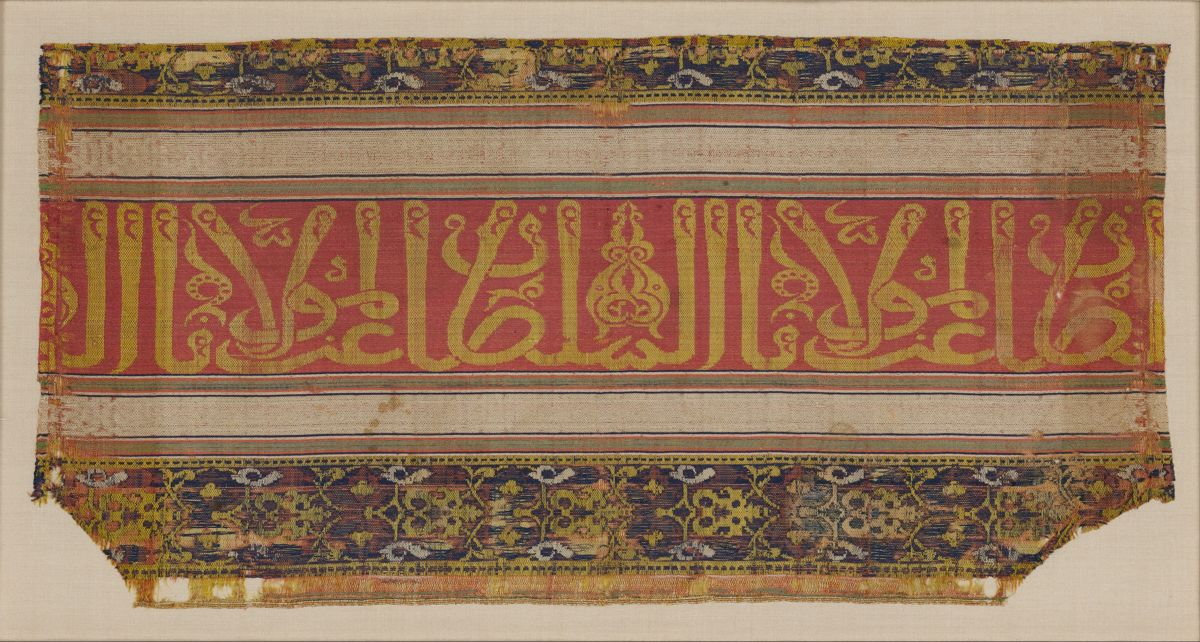
A Nasrid-era silk textile fragment, with the epigraphic inscription "glory to our lord the Sultan".

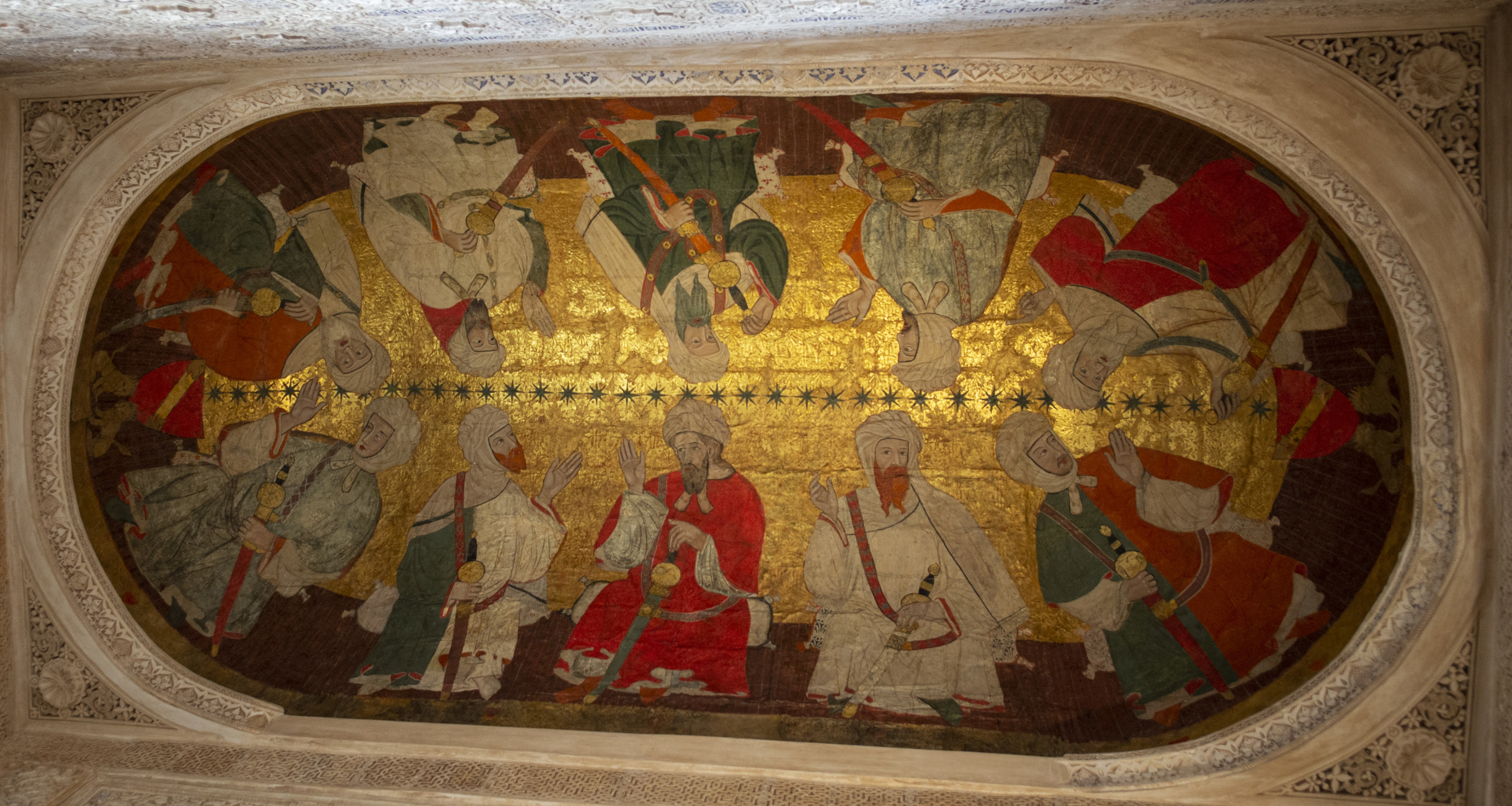
Painting in the ceiling of the Hall of Kings of the Alhambra, depicting the ten Sultans of Granada.

== Lineage ==
The Nasrid dynasty was descended from the Arab Banu Khazraj tribe, and claimed direct male-line descent from Sa'd ibn Ubadah, the chief of the tribe and one of the companions of the Islamic prophet Muhammad.

== List of Nasrid sultans of Granada ==
Except as noted, this list is based on Mediano (2010) with biographical details from O'Callaghan (2014).

No.	Name	Reign	Notes
Ghalibi Branch (Note: The first few rulers of the dynasty were descended from Muhammad I, also called al-Ghalib billah) (al-dawla al-ghalibiyya al-nasriyya)
1	Muhammad I أبو عبد الله محمد بن يوسف الغالب بالله; Abū ʿAbd Allāh Muḥammad ibn Yūsuf al-Ghalib bi-'llāh	16 July 1232 – 22 January 1273 (~41 years)	1194 – 22 January 1273 (aged 79): Great-great-grandson of Nasr ibn al-Ahmar.; Rebelled against Ibn Hud in his Arjona; forced to submit to him as an autonomous ruler.; Captured Granada in 1237; began the construction of Alhambra.; Died after falling off his horse.
2	Muhammad II أبو عبد الله محمد بن محمد الفقيه; Abū ʿAbd Allāh Muḥammad ibn Muḥammad al-Faqīh	22 January 1273 – 8 April 1302 (~29 years)	c. 1235 – 8 April 1302 (aged 67): Son and heir of Muhammad I; consolidated the Nasrid state.; Died naturally; possibly poisoned by his son Muhammad III.
3	Muhammad III أبو عبد الله محمد بن محمد المخلوع; Abū ʿAbd Allāh Muḥammad ibn Muḥammad al-Makhlūʿ	8 April 1302 – 14 March 1309 (~7 years)	15 August 1257 – 21 January 1314 (aged 56): Son of Muhammad II; Nasrid conquest of Ceuta.; Became visually impaired; de facto rule by vizier Ibn al-Hakim al-Rundi.; Submitted to Ferdinand IV as a Castilian vassal.; Deposed due to his unpopular policies; executed after a failed restoration attempt.; Known as "the deposed" (al-Makhlu)
4	Nasr أبو الجيوش نصر بن محمد; Abū al-Juyūsh Naṣr ibn Muḥammad	14 March 1309 – 8 February 1314 (~5 years)	1 November 1287 – 16 November 1322 (aged 35): Half-brother of Muhammad III; ascended after the coup against him.; Made peace in exchange of losing Gibraltar to Castile and Ceuta to Marinids.; Failed revolt by his brother-in-law Faraj ibn Isma'il (1311).; Abdicated after being defeated by Faraj's son Isma'il; allowed to rule Guadix.
Isma'ili Branch (Note: Not to be confused with Shia Isma'ilis, this branch of the dynasty is named after their ancestor, Muhammad I's brother, Isma'il.) (al-dawla al-isma'iliyya al-nasriyya)
5	Isma'il I أبو الوليد إسماعيل بن فرج; Abū al-Walīd Ismāʿīl ibn Faraj	February 1314 – 8 July 1325 (~11 years)	3 March 1279 – 8 July 1325 (aged 46): Nephew of Nasr; ascended after his removal.; Victories against Castile (1319).; Assassinated by a relative for personal reasons.
6	Muhammad IV أبو عبد الله محمد بن إسماعيل; Abū ʿAbd Allāh Muḥammad ibn Ismāʿīl	8 July 1325 – 25 August 1333 (~8 years)	14 April 1315 – 25 August 1333 (aged 18): Young son of Isma'il; civil war among viziers for political control.; Conflict with Castile over Gibraltar; assassinated after returning from a successful campaign.
7	Yusuf I أبو الحجاج يوسف بن إسماعيل المؤيد بالله; Abū al-Hajjāj Yūsuf ibn Ismāʿīl al-Muʾayyad bi-'llāh	August 1333 – 19 October 1354 (~21 years)	29 June 1318 – 19 October 1354 (aged 36): Brother of Yusuf; initially sidelined by his ministers and grandmother Fatima, due to his youth.; Castilian victory against Nasrid-Marinid alliance (1340).; Murdered by a madman while praying in Mosque of Granada.
8	Muhammad V أبو عبد الله محمد بن يوسف الغني بالله; Abū ʿAbd Allāh Muḥammad ibn Yūsuf al-Ghanī bi-'llāh	October 1354 – August 1359 (~5 years)	4 January 1339 – 16 January 1391 (aged 52): Son and heir of Yusuf I; ascended as a minor and controlled by a regency.; Deposed by his stepmother and Muhammad el Bermejo.; Fled to Marinid Fez after failing to secure support for a restoration.
9	Isma'il II أبو الوليد إسماعيل بن يوسف; Abū al-Walīd Ismāʿīl ibn Yūsuf	23 August 1359 – 24 June/13 July 1360 (~10 months)	4 October 1339 – 24 June/13 July 1360 (aged 20): Younger half-brother of Muhammad V.; Installed, dominated, and eventually deposed and executed by Muhammad el Bermejo.
10	Muhammad VI أبو عبد الله محمد بن إسماعيل الغالب بالله; Abū ʿAbd Allāh Muḥammad ibn Ismāʿīl al-Ghālib bi-'llāh	June/July 1360 – April 1362 (~2 years)	1333 – 25 April 1362 (aged 28–29): Second-cousin and brother-in-law of Isma'il II; controlled and eventually overthrew him.; Defeated by the returning Muhammad V and his Castilian allies.; Surrendered to Peter I in Seville, who executed him instead.; Known as "The Red King" (el rey Bermejo)
(8)	Muhammad V أبو عبد الله محمد بن يوسف الغني بالله; Abū ʿAbd Allāh Muḥammad ibn Yūsuf al-Ghanī bi-'llāh	April 1362 – 16 January 1391 (~29 years)	4 January 1339 – 16 January 1391 (aged 52): Returned and defeated Muhammad VI with the support of his allies.; Built Alhambra's Court of the lions; patronized Ibn Khaldun.
11	Yusuf II أبو الحجاج يوسف بن محمد المستغني بالله; Abū al-Hajjāj Yūsuf ibn Muḥammad al-Mustaghnī bi-'llāh	15 January 1391 – 5 October 1392 (~2 years)	c. 1356 – 5 October 1392 (aged 36): Son of Muhammad V; died of unknown causes (possibly poisoned).
12	Muhammad VII أبو عبد الله محمد بن يوسف; Abū ʿAbd Allāh Muḥammad ibn Yūsuf	3 October 1392 – 13 May 1408 (~16 years)	c. 1377 – 13 May 1408 (aged 31): Son of Yusuf II; conducted peace treaty against Christian kingdoms.; Died of natural causes.
13	Yusuf III أبو الحجاج يوسف بن يوسف الناصر لدين الله; Abū al-Hajjāj Yūsuf ibn Yūsuf al-Nāṣir li-Dīn Allāh	1408 – 1417 (~9 years)	1376 – 9 November 1417 (aged 41): Son and original heir of Yusuf II; sidelined and imprisoned by his brother Muhammad VII.; Released and enthroned after Muhammad VII's death.; A noted poet-king; died of illness.
14	Muhammad VIII أبو عبد الله محمد بن يوسف المتمسك بالله; Abū ʿAbd Allāh Muḥammad ibn Yūsuf al-Mutamassik bi-'llāh	1417 – 1419 (~2 years)	1411 – 1431 (aged 20): Son of Yusuf III; ascended as a child, actual rule by grand-vizier.; Deposed and imprisoned due to his youth and alleged incapacity.; Known as "the Little One" (al-Ṣaghīr / el Pequeño)
15	Muhammad IX محمد بن نصر الغالب بالله; Muḥammad ibn Naṣr al-Ghālib bi-'llāh	1419 – 1427 (~8 years)	1396 – 1454 (aged 58): Grandson of Muhammad V; crowned by elites discontent with Muhammad VIII's rule.; Overthrown in favor of Muhammad VIII; escaped to Tunis.; Known as "the Left-Handed" (al-Aysar / el Zurdo)
(14)	Muhammad VIII أبو عبد الله محمد بن يوسف المتمسك بالله; Abū ʿAbd Allāh Muḥammad ibn Yūsuf al-Mutamassik bi-'llāh	1427 – 1429 (~2 years)	1411 – 1431 (aged 20): Reinstalled after Muhammad IX's overthrow.; Defeated, imprisoned and eventually executed by the returning Muhammad IX.
(15)	Muhammad IX محمد بن نصر الغالب بالله; Muḥammad ibn Naṣr al-Ghālib bi-'llāh	1430 – 1431 (~1 year)	1396 – 1454 (aged 58): Returned with Hafsid backing; defeated and overthrew Muhammad VIII.; Defeated in battle against Castile; fled after installation of Yusuf IV.
16	Yusuf IV يوسف بن المولى; Yūsuf ibn al-Mawl	1432 (a few months)	d. 1432: Maternal grandson of Muhammad VI; installed with Castilian backing and vassal status.; Disliked due to his pro-Castile policies; defeated and executed by the returning Muhammad IX.; Known as Abenalmao
(15)	Muhammad IX محمد بن نصر الغالب بالله; Muḥammad ibn Naṣr al-Ghālib bi-'llāh	1432 – 1445 (~13 years)	1396 – 1454 (aged 58): Returned and defeated the unpopular Yusuf IV.; Abdicated after a revolt by his nephew Yusuf.
17	Yusuf V يوسف بن أحمد; Yūsuf ibn Aḥmad	1445 – 1446 (~1 year)	c. 1400–1410 – 1447 (aged 37–47): Nephew of Muhammad IX; soon defeated by a pretender.; Fled to Almeria; eventually assassinated.; Known as "The Lame" (al-Ahnaf / el Cojo)
18	Isma'il III أبو الوليد إسماعيل; Abū al-Walīd Ismāʿīl	1446 – 1447 (~1 year)	d. 1450: Castile-backed pretender of unknown lineage; dethroned Yusuf V.; Defeated by Muhammad IX; fled to Castile.; Defeated and executed by Muhammad IX after briefly capturing Malaga.
(15)	Muhammad IX محمد بن نصر الغالب بالله; Muḥammad ibn Naṣr al-Ghālib bi-'llāh	1447 – 1453 (~6 years)	1396 – 1454 (aged 58): Returned and defeated the pretender Isma'il III.; Disastrous defeat against Castile (1452).; Died of natural causes.
19	Muhammad X محمد بن محمد المنصور بالله; Muḥammad ibn Muḥammad al-Manṣūr bi-'llāh	1453 – 1454 (~1 year)	d. 1455: Son of Muhammad VIII; son-in-law and heir of Muhammad IX.; Forced to abdicate in favor of rival claimant, Sa'd.; Known as "The Little Fellow" (al-Ṣaghīr / el Chiquito)
20	Abu Nasr Sa'd أبو نصر سعد بن علي المستعين بالله; Abū Naṣr Saʿd ibn ʿAlī al-Mustaʿīn bi-'llāh	1454 – 1455 (~1 year)	d. 1465: First cousin once-removed of Muhammad X; ascended after his abdication.; Fled after Muhammad X retook the throne.; Known as Ciriza and Muley Zad
(19)	Muhammad X محمد بن محمد المنصور بالله; Muḥammad ibn Muḥammad al-Manṣūr bi-'llāh	1455 (a few months)	d. 1455: Retook throne from Sa'd; overthrown and executed after an unpopular truce with Castile.
(20)	Abu Nasr Sa'd أبو نصر سعد بن علي المستعين بالله; Abū Naṣr Saʿd ibn ʿAlī al-Mustaʿīn bi-'llāh	1455 – 1462 (~7 years)	d. 1465: Overthrew the unpopular Muhammad X; intense warfare against Castile.; Fled Granada after Isma'il IV's seizing the throne.
21	Isma'il IV إسماعيل; Ismāʿīl	1462 – 1463 (~1 year)	d. 1463: Nasrid prince of unknown lineage; proclaimed sultan against unpopular Sa'd.; Overthrown after a costly truce with Castile; likely died soon after.
(20)	Abu Nasr Sa'd أبو نصر سعد بن علي المستعين بالله; Abū Naṣr Saʿd ibn ʿAlī al-Mustaʿīn bi-'llāh	1463 – 1464 (~1 year)	d. 1465: Restored after Isma'il IV's overthrow.; Deposed by his son; died in Almeria.
22	Abu al-Hasan Ali أبو الحسن علي بن سعد; Abū al-Ḥasan ʿAlī ibn Saʿd	1464 – 1482 (~18 years)	d. 1485: Son of Sa'd; took the throne from his father.; Beginning of the Granada war (1482).; Deposed by his son Muhammad XI; fled and ruled from Malaga.; Known as Muley Hacén
23	Muhammad XI أبو عبد الله محمد بن علي; Abū ʿAbd Allāh Muḥammad ibn ʿAlī	1482 (less than 1 year)	c. 1460 – 1533 (aged 73): Son of Ali; took control of Granada while his father was on campaign.; Captured and imprisoned by Castilian forces.
(22)	Abu al-Hasan Ali أبو الحسن علي بن سعد; Abū al-Ḥasan ʿAlī ibn Saʿd	1482 – 1485 (~3 years)	d. 1485: Recalled to Granada after Muhammad XI's capture.; Deposed by his brother Muhammad XII due to his failing health.
24	Muhammad XII أبو عبد الله محمد بن سعد الزغل; Abū ʿAbd Allāh Muḥammad ibn Saʿd al-Zaghal	1485 – 1486 (~1 year)	c. 1444 – c. 1494 (aged 50): Brother and second-in-command of Ali; took the throne from him.; Lost Granada to Muhammad XI while on campaign.; Ruled Eastern territories of the emirate; surrendered to Catholic monarchs (1489).; Emigrated to Tlemcen; spent the rest of his life there.; Known as "The Brave" (al-Zaghal / el Zagal)
(23)	Muhammad XI أبو عبد الله محمد بن علي; Abū ʿAbd Allāh Muḥammad ibn ʿAlī	1486 – 2 January 1492 (~6 years)	c. 1460 – 1533 (aged 73): Released by Castile to reignite the civil war; seized Granada while Muhammad XII was away.; Ruled western territories as a tributary of Castile.; Surrendered Granada to the Catholic monarchs; end of Al-Andalus.; Emigrated to Fez; spent the rest of his life there.

== Genealogy ==
Family tree of Nasrid sultans. Only the offspring whose descendants reigned are shown.

Unless an year of death is given, the ruler ruled till death or died soon after their reign ended.

al-Ahmar
Nasr
Ahmad
Muhammad
Yusuf
Muhammad I r. 1232-73	Isma'il
Muhammad II r. 1273-1302
Muhammad III r. 1302-09 d. 1314	Nasr r. 1309-14 d. 1322	Fatima d. 1349	Faraj d. 1320
Isma'il I r. 1314-25	Muhammad
Muhammad IV r. 1325-33	Yusuf I r. 1333-54	Isma'il
Muhammad V r. 1354-59, 1362-91	Isma'il II r. 1359-1360	bint Yusuf	Muhammad VI r. 1360-62
Yusuf II r. 1391-92	Nasr	bint Muhammad	Muhammad ibn al-Mawl
Muhammad VII r. 1392-1408	Yusuf III r. 1408-17	Ali	Ahmad	Muhammad IX r. 1419-27, 1430-31, 1432-45, 1447-53, d. 1454	Yusuf IV r. 1431-32
Isma'il III r. 1446-47, d. 1450	Muhammad VIII r. 1417-19, 1427-29, d. 1431	Sa'd r. 1454-55, 1455-62, 1463-64, d. 1465	Yusuf V r. 1445-46, 1462, d. 1463
Isma'il IV r. 1462-63	Muhammad X r. 1453-54, 1455	Muhammad XII r. 1485-86, d. 1494	Ali r. 1464-82, 1482-85	A'isha
Muhammad XI r. 1482, 1486-92, d. 1518/36

== See also ==
- Romance of Abenámar
- Taifa of Granada

== Bibliography ==
- Arié, Rachel (1990). L'Espagne musulmane au Temps des Nasrides (1232–1492) (in French) (2nd ed.). De Boccard. ISBN 2-7018-0052-8.
- Boloix-Gallardo, Bárbara (2021). "Granada, Capital of al-Andalus and Core of the Nasrid Kingdom (7th–9th/13th–15th Centuries)". A Companion to Islamic Granada. Brill. p. 122. ISBN 978-90-04-42581-1.
- Bueno, Francisco (2004). Los Reyes de la Alhambra. Entre la historia y la leyenda (in Spanish). Miguel Sánchez. ISBN 84-7169-082-9.
- Cortés Peña, Antonio Luis; Vincent, Bernard (1983–1987). Historia de Granada. 4 vols (in Spanish). Editorial Don Quijote.
- Fernández Puertas, Antonio (1997). The Alhambra. Vol 1. From the Ninth Century to Yusuf I (1354). Saqi Books. ISBN 0-86356-466-6.
- Fernández Puertas, Antonio (1997). The Alhambra. Vol. 2. (1354–1391). Saqi Books. ISBN 0-86356-467-4.
- Fernández-Puertas, Antonio (April 1997). "The Three Great Sultans of al-Dawla al-Ismā'īliyya al-Naṣriyya Who Built the Fourteenth-Century Alhambra: Ismā'īl I, Yūsuf I, Muḥammad V (713–793/1314–1391)". Journal of the Royal Asiatic Society. Third Series. 7 (1): 1–25. doi:10.1017/S1356186300008294. S2CID 154717811.
- Harvey, Leonard Patrick (1992). Islamic Spain 1250 to 1500. University of Chicago Press. ISBN 0-226-31962-8.
- Latham, J.D. & Fernández-Puertas, A. (1993). "Naṣrids". In Bosworth, C. E.; van Donzel, E.; Heinrichs, W. P. & Pellat, Ch. (eds.). The Encyclopaedia of Islam, Second Edition. Volume VII: Mif–Naz. Leiden: E. J. Brill. pp. 1020–1029. ISBN 978-90-04-09419-2.
- Mediano, Fernando (2010), "The post-Almohad dynasties in al-Andalus and the Maghrib (seventh–ninth/thirteenth–fifteenth centuries)", in Fierro, Maribel (ed.), The New Cambridge History of Islam: Volume 2, Cambridge: Cambridge University Press, pp. 106–143, doi:10.1017/CHOL9780521839570.006, ISBN 978-0-521-83957-0
- Miranda, Ambroxio Huici (1970). "The Iberian Peninsula and Sicily". In Holt, P.M; Lambton, Ann K.S.; Lewis, Bernard (eds.). The Cambridge History of Islam. Vol. 2A. Cambridge University Press.
- O'Callaghan, Joseph F. (2014). The last crusade in the West: Castile and the conquest of Granada. Middle Ages series (1st ed.). Philadelphia: University of Pennsylvania Press. ISBN 978-0-8122-4587-5.
- Vidal Castro, Francisco (2018). "Ismail III". Real Academia de la Historia.
- Vidal Castro, Francisco (2018a). "Ismail IV". Real Academia de la Historia.
- Vidal Castro, Francisco (2008c). "Muhammad I". Real Academia de la Historia.
- Watt, W. Montgomery (1965). A History of Islamic Spain. Edinburgh University Press. ISBN 0-7486-0847-8.
- Chisholm, Hugh, ed. (1911). "Nasrides, The" . Encyclopædia Britannica. Vol. 19 (11th ed.). Cambridge University Press. pp. 249–250.
