= Aixa =

Nasrid royalty

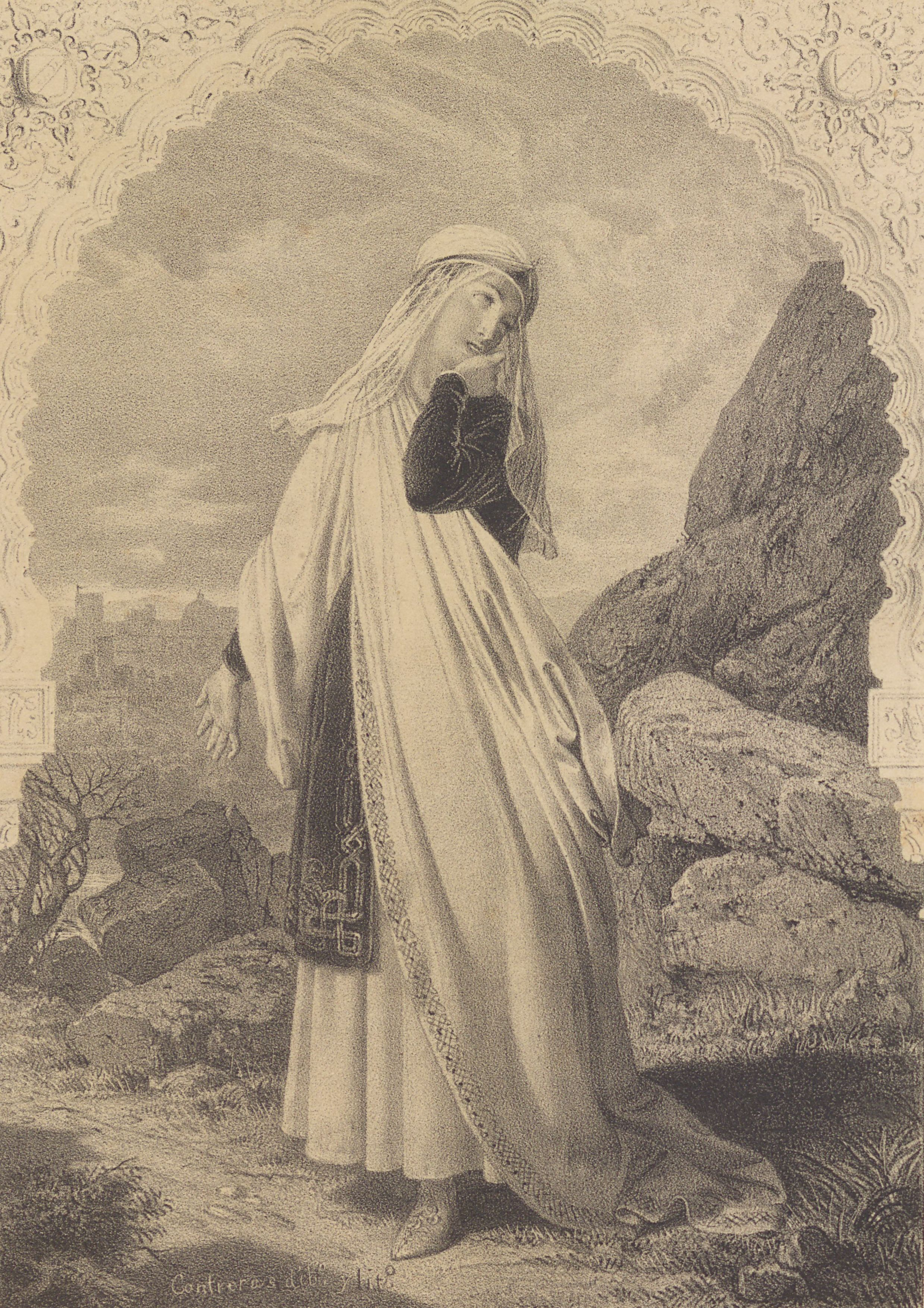
- Illustration of Aixa from Mugeres célebres de España y Portugal by Juan de Dios de la Rada, 1868.
- Born: Emirate of Granada
- Died: after 1493; Fez, Morocco
- Spouse: Muhammad XI of Granada (died 1455) Abu'l-Hasan Ali of Granada (m. 1455; died 1485)
- Issue: Second Marriage; Muhammad XI of Granada
- House: Nasrid
- Father: Muhammad IX of Granada (likely)

Aisha al-Hurra (Arabic: عائشة الحرة; fl. 1493), generally known by the Spanish spelling Aixa, was a Queen of the Nasrid dynasty. She was the spouse of Muhammad X and of Abu l-Hasan Ali, and the mother of Muhammad XI. She was politically active and exerted influence upon the state policy during the last years of the Emirate of Granada. Aixa is one of the best known women of the history of the Emirate of Granada.

Aixa was also known by the Muslims as ʿAisha al-Ḥorra; "al-Ḥorra" being a noble title (meaning "Free Woman") because she was one of the living descendants of Muhammed.

== Life ==
Aixa was born a member of the ruling Nasrid dynasty of Granada, likely the daughter of Muhammed IX.

She personally owned several palaces and properties. The Nasrid princesses had control over their own property (dowry) in accordance with Islamic law and were free to dispose of it as they pleased, provided they continued to observe their harem seclusion.

The princes of the Nasrid dynasty could have many slave concubines, but normally only married members of the Nasrid dynasty to benefit dynastic legitimacy, forge alliances between different family fractions and keep royal property in the family. Aixa was first married to Muhammad X; after his death in 1455, she was married by his successor Said to his heir, Abu l-Hasan Ali. Her second marriage was likely an attempt to make peace between the rival factions of the dynasty. Aixa was exiled to another palace with her sons after her spouse fell in love with his Christian slave Isabel de Solís and married her.

In 1482, Aixa allied herself with the opposition party Abencerrages and had her husband deposed in favour of her son Muhammed XI, also known as Boabdil. Aixa was politically active during the reign of her son. She is said to have prevented harassment of the Christians in Granada. In 1483, she handled the negotiations for the release of her son, who had been taken captive by Castile.

Aixa was known to be an extreme patriot, since she wanted to continue to fight to the death using women, children, and old men, even though the army of Granada was defeated by Ferdinand and Isabella of Castile and Aragon. She blamed the defeat on traitors in the kingdom who allowed themselves to betray their country for large sums of money and property if they would convince their king to surrender the Kingdom of Granada.

After the fall of Granada in 1492, she followed her son into exile—first to Alpujarras, and in 1493 to Fes.

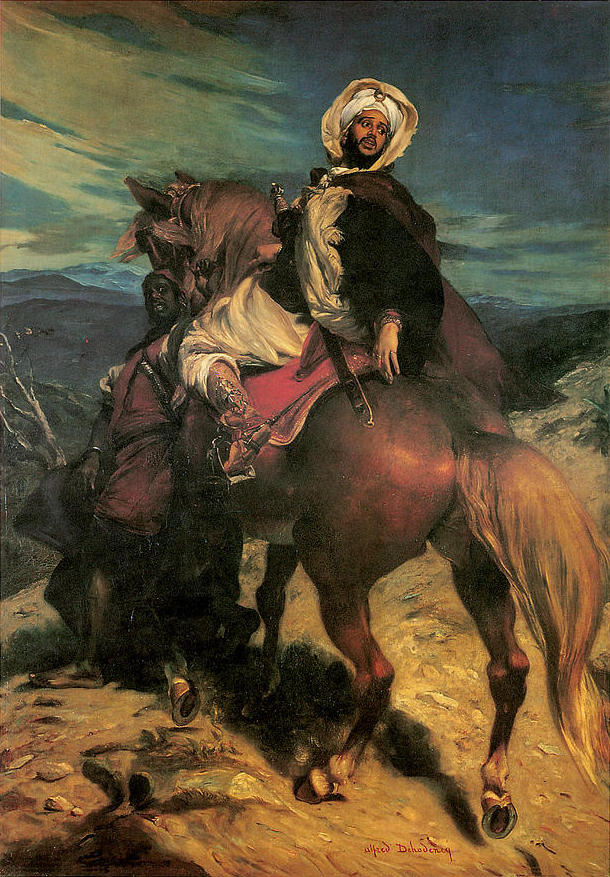
Boabdil's Farewell to Granada by Alfred Dehodencq (1822–1882) showing Muhammad XII looking back at Granada.

A famous legend says that when her deposed son Muhammad XI left Granada after its fall, he reined his horse and for a final time looked back upon Granada and wept. Aixa then replied:

"Weep now like a woman the lost kingdom you did not defend like a man!"

ابكِ مثل النساء مُلكاَ مضاعا لم تحافظ عليه مثل الرجال

Ibki mithl al-nisāʾ mulkan muḍāʿan lam tuḥāfiẓ ʿalāyhi mithl ar-rijāl

The place where he stopped is known as "the Last Sigh of the Moor".

== See also ==
- Dar al-Horra

== Bibliography ==
- Dolores Mirón, Universidad de Granada, Andalucía Comunidad Cultural, Biografías de Mujeres Andaluzas Aixa.
- Carpeta Didáctica: Al-Ándalus III: el Sultanato de Granada (1232-1492) y una breve reseña sobre la Alhambra.
- R.H. Shamsuddín Elía, “Historia de Al-Andalus”, Boletín N° 53 -08/2006 Al-Ándalus III: El Sultanato de Granada (1232-1492).
- Nicolás Homar Vives, Reyes y Reinos Genealogías, Granada.
- Washington Irving, The Alhambra, texto original inglés en Internet de Tales of the Alhambra, ed. Padre Suárez, Granada, 1953.
