= Muhammad XII of Granada =

23rd Nasrid emir of Granada (r. 1485–86)

Emir of Granada
- Reign: 1485–1486
- Predecessor: Abu'l-Hasan Ali of Granada
- Successor: Muhammad XI of Granada
- Born: c. 1440; Alhambra, Granada
- Died: c. 1494; Tlemcen?
Names
- Abū 'Abd Allāh Muhammad al-Zaghall -أ
- House: Nasrid dynasty
- Father: Abu Nasr Sa'd
- Religion: Islam

Muhammad XII, (Note: This emir was previously designated Muhammad XIII but following publication of a new Nasrid-era Arabic source, Ibn c Āṣim's Junnat al-Rida, it has been shown that the emir previously thought to be Muhammad X did not exist. This has required the renumbering of three later sultans: Muhammad XI al-Sagir, the Little One (becomes Muhammad X), Muhammad XII, Boabdil (becomes Muhammad XI), and Muhammad XIII al-Zagal (becomes Muhammad XII).) known as al-Zagal (c. 1440 – May,1494), was the 23rd Nasrid ruler of the Granada, reigning from 1485 to 1487. His popular epithet, al-Zagal, meaning "the Brave," or "the Valiant," distinguished him as the last significant military commander of the Nasrid dynasty.

== Life ==
Born into the ruling house at an uncertain date, most likely around 1440, he was the second son of Emir Abu Nasr Sa'd and the younger brother of a future emir, Abu l-Ḥasan Ali, known in Castilian sources as Muley Hacén. His nephew, Muhammad XI (Boabdil), would become his principal rival.

A Christian chronicler described al-Zagal as tall, well-proportioned, and bearing a grave, dignified countenance of notable pallor.

Al-Zagal first appears in the historical record in 1455 as the youthful governor of Almería, during a time when his father, Sa'd, was struggling with Muhammad X for the throne. In 1464, al-Zagal fled to Castile to avoid arrest when his brother, Abu'l-Hasan Ali, seized the throne from their father. In 1470, he returned to Granada and reconciled with his brother. Thereafter, al-Zagal remained a committed loyalist and served as the principal military commander during Abu'l-Hasan's reign.

Al-Zagal rose to prominence during the civil wars of the early 1480s. When Boabdil rebelled against his father in 1482, al-Zagal remained loyal to Abu al-Hasan and supported him in exile. In 1483, he commanded forces that defeated a Castilian army near Málaga, strengthening his reputation. After Boabdil’s capture in the same year, Abu al-Hasan briefly regained the throne, with al-Zagal acting as his principal military commander during the emir’s declining health.

In 1485, amid continued warfare and internal instability, al-Zagal was proclaimed ruler in Granada. His reign was marked by ongoing conflict with both Castilian forces and the rival faction led by Boabdil. Although he achieved a victory at Moclín shortly after his accession, the broader military situation deteriorated as Castilian armies captured key towns and fortresses. At the same time, Boabdil, supported by Castile, gained control in parts of the emirate and renewed the civil war.

In 1487 Boabdil seized Granada while al-Zagal was engaged elsewhere. Al-Zagal withdrew to the eastern territories, including Guadix, Baza, and the Alpujarras, where he maintained an independent base of power and continued resistance. Despite some local successes, he was unable to halt the advance of Castilian forces. The prolonged siege and eventual surrender of Baza in 1489 marked a decisive turning point, leading to the collapse of his remaining position.

In December 1489, al-Zagal entered into agreements with the Catholic Monarchs, surrendering his territories and accepting a subordinate status in exchange for limited lands and financial compensation. In 1490, he obtained permission to leave the Iberian Peninsula and emigrated to North Africa, settling in Tlemcen where he died in May 1494.

== Bibliography ==
- Boloix Gallardo, Bárbara (2022). "Chapter 6 Granada, Capital of al-Andalus and Core of the Nasrid Kingdom (7th–9th/13th–15th Centuries)". A companion to Islamic Granada. Brill. ISBN 978-90-04-38211-4.
- Catlos, Brian A. (2018). Kingdoms of faith: a new history of Islamic Spain (first ed.). New York: Basic Books. ISBN 978-0-465-05587-6.
- Gallardo, B. B. (2020). "Chapter 1 The Banū Naṣr: The Founders of the Nasrid Kingdom of Granada (Thirteenth–Fifteenth Centuries)". The Nasrid Kingdom of Granada between East and West. Brill.
- Harvey, L. P. (1990). Islamic Spain, 1250 to 1500. Chicago: University of Chicago Press. ISBN 978-0-226-31960-5.
- Latham, J.D; Fernández-Puertas, A. (2012). "Nasrids". Encyclopaedia of Islam New Edition Online (EI-2 English). Brill.
- Mediano, F. (2010). "The post-Almohad dynasties in al-Andalus and the Maghrib (seventh–ninth/thirteenth–fifteenth centuries)". The New Cambridge History of Islam. Vol. 4. Cambridge University Press.
- O'Callaghan, Joseph F. (2014). The last crusade in the West: Castile and the conquest of Granada. Middle Ages series (1st ed.). Philadelphia: University of Pennsylvania Press. ISBN 978-0-8122-4587-5.
- Vidal Castro, Francisco. "Muhammad XII". Real Academia de la Historia (in Spanish).

Muhammad XII of Granada Nasrid dynasty Cadet branch of the Banu Khazraj Born: 1444? Died: 1494?
Regnal titles
Preceded by Abu'l-Hasan Ali	Emir of Granada; 1485–1486	Succeeded by Muhammad XI
