= Al-Musta'in (disambiguation) =

Al-Musta'in Billah المستعين بالله
- Pronunciation: al-Musta'in al-Musstain
- Gender: Male

Origin
- Origin: Semitic (Arabic)
- Meaning: He who looks for help to God
- Region of origin: Arabia (Middle East)

Al-Musta'in Billah (Arabic: المستعين بالله, romanized: al-Mustaʿīn bi-ʿllāh, lit. 'He who looks for help to God') was the regnal name of the twelfth Abbasid Caliph ruling from 862 to 866.

The title was also used by:

- Sulayman ibn al-Hakam, the fifth caliph of Córdoba (1009–1010, 1013–1016)
- Al-Musta'in I, the first Hudid ruler of Zaragoza (1039–1046/1049)
- Al-Musta'in II, the fourth Hudid ruler of Zaragoza (1085–1110)
- Al-Musta'in (Egypt), the tenth Caliph of Cairo (1406–1414)
- Abu Nasr Sa'd of Granada, the twentieth sultan of Granada (1455–1462, 1462–1464)
- Abdullah of Pahang, (born 1959) also known as Al-Sultan Abdullah Ri'ayatuddin Al-Mustafa Billah Shah ibni Almarhum Sultan Haji Ahmad Shah Al-Musta'in Billah, the Malaysian Sultan of Pahang
