= Abu'l-Hasan Ali of Granada =

Abu'l-Hasan Ali

Sultan of Granada (1st reign)
- Reign: 1464–1482
- Predecessor: Abu Nasr Sa'd of Granada
- Successor: Muhammad XI of Granada

Sultan of Granada (2nd reign)
- Reign: 1483–1485
- Predecessor: Muhammad XI of Granada
- Successor: Muhammad XII of Granada
- Died: 1485
- Spouse: Aisha al-Hurra; Isabel de Solís
- Issue: Muḥammed XI; Abu al-Hajjaj Yúsuf; Aixa; Juan de Granada; Fernando de Granada
- Dynasty: Nasrides
- Father: Abu Nasr Sa'd of Granada
- Religion: Islam

Abu al-Hasan Ali (1436 - September 1485), known in Castilian sources as Muley Hacen, (Note: a corruption of the Arabic mawlāy Hasan ("my lord Hasan")) was the twenty-first Nasrid ruler of the Emirate of Granada. He reigned from 1464 to 1482 and again from 1483 to 1485. His reign occurred during the final years of Nasrid rule and was noted for dynastic conflict and renewed warfare with the Crown of Castile. His rule ended amid civil war within the emirate and increasing external pressure from the Catholic Monarchs.

== Origins and family ==
Abu al-Hasan Ali was born in Granada shortly before 1436, the eldest son of Emir Sa'd. He had two brothers: the future Muhammad XII, known as al-Zagal, and Yusuf, who died in 1467. Raised within the Nasrid court, Abu al-Hasan was trained in governance, diplomacy, and warfare. From an early age he participated in government and appears in sources as actively involved in political and military affairs before his accession. He also spoke some Spanish and served as an interpreter in diplomatic exchanges between Granada and Castile.

He married Aisha al-Hurra, a daughter of Muḥammad IX. The marriage produced at least two sons, the future Muhammad XI, known to Christian chroniclers as Boabdil, and Yusuf, as well as a daughter. After a long marriage, Abu al-Hasan took as a concubine a Christian captive who converted to Islam and was called Thurayya (known in Castilian sources as Zoraya). He later married her, and they had two sons, Sa'd and Nasr, who later converted to Christianity under the Catholic Monarchs and were baptized Fernando and Juan. The sultan's favoritism toward Thuraya, including the extensive properties he settled on her and her children, caused acute tensions with Aisha and her faction, playing a major role in court divisions that eventually destabilized his reign. Numerous legendary and literary versions of these events have been written, supported by sometimes contradictory information from various Arab, Hebrew, and Christian sources.

== Early career ==
Abu al-Hasan’s political activity is first recorded in 1455, when his father, Sa'd, was dethroned by Muhammad X. Seeking to regain power, Sa'd entered into a vassal relationship with Henry IV of Castile. As a guarantee of this agreement, Abu al-Hasan was sent to the Castilian court with a retinue of officials and soldiers. He participated in diplomatic contacts between the two courts and accompanied Henry IV on a campaign into Nasrid territory in April 1455. He helped arrange a meeting between his father and the Castilian king on May 12, 1455, and served as interpreter during their negotiations. Afterward, he returned to Granada with his father. When his father regained the throne, Abu al-Hasan personally captured the deposed Muhammad X in the Alpujarras and delivered him to the Alhambra, where he was executed.

By March 1458, he had assumed the governorship of Almería. Over the following years, Abu al-Hasan took on additional responsibility in administration and military affairs. By August 1459, official documents addressed him with sovereign attributes, including the honorific title al-Ghalib billah (“the one who prevails by the grace of God”). His military activity included a raid into Castilian territory on April 11, 1462, targeting towns in the Seville region, though the returning forces suffered losses during withdrawal. In February 1463, he participated in concluding an eight-month truce with Castile.

== First reign ==
His growing authority created frictions within the ruling family. In March 1464, his brother Muhammad fled to Castilian territory, fearing arrest. Later that year, supported by influential court factions, including elements of the Banu al-Sarraj, Abu al-Hasan deposed his father and took control of Granada, expelling Sa'd from the Alhambra around September 7, 1464. The threat of Castilian intervention soon led to a reconciliation between father and son. Sa'd was restored in title but retained little power and resided in Almería until his death in August 1465.

Others soon challenged Abu al-Hasan’s rule. His brother Yusuf attempted to seize power but later reconciled with him, only to die in 1467. Meanwhile, shifting political conditions in Castile led to renewed truces. In April 1465, a five-year truce was agreed, followed by additional agreements in 1469 and subsequent years, although these often applied unevenly along the frontier.

In 1468, a revolt broke out in Málaga under a local leader known in Castilian sources as Mahomat Quircot. The rebellion gained support from Henry IV and members of the Banu al-Sarraj and continued until 1473. Around 1470, unrest among provincial governors intensified, with many belonging to the same powerful family. These uprisings were partly in response to Abu al-Hasan’s efforts to reduce local autonomy and reassert central authority. His measures included replacing officials, reclaiming lands alienated from the royal domain, reducing military pay, and confiscating opponents' property.

Abu al-Hasan eventually restored a degree of stability after suppressing the revolts. This period, roughly from the mid-1460s to the early 1480s, saw economic recovery and administrative continuity. Coinage was minted in his name, including gold dinars, silver, and copper. During these years, he conducted military operations along the frontier and took advantage of divisions among Andalusi leaders and Castilian factions. In December 1471, he concluded an alliance with the Count of Cabra. On January 21, 1472, he signed a three-year general peace treaty with Castile, which included provisions against supporting internal rebels.

After Henry IV died in 1474, the succession of Isabella and Ferdinand did not immediately change the situation. The new rulers maintained truces with Granada while fighting elsewhere. Agreements were concluded in 1475, extended in 1476, and renewed in 1478. Frontier incidents remained frequent. In 1477, Abu al-Hasan raided Cieza in response to Castilian violations of the peace and took 2000 inhabitants captive. This action contributed to a new treaty in January 1478, which notably did not require Granada to pay tribute. In January 1481, the truce was renewed for another year.

The union of Castile and Aragon through the Treaty of Alcacovas (1479) and the resolution of Castile's conflict with Portugal shifted the strategic balance. The Catholic Monarchs were now free to direct their full resources against Granada. Aware of the change, Abu al-Hasan took the initiative and reconquered Zahara de la Sierra on December 27, 1481. Castile responded by capturing Alhama on February 28, 1482, a decisive blow that severed the main route between Granada and its western territories. Three successive attempts in March, April and July failed to retake Alhama. However, Abu al-Hasan won a significant victory at Loja in July 1482, routing the Castilian army and capturing considerable artillery and supplies.

== Overthrow ==
Meanwhile, internal opposition to Abu al-Hasan's rule intensified. His eldest son, Muhammad (Boabdil), supported by factions within the court and by his mother Aisha, led a rebellion. Taking advantage of his father’s absence during the campaign at Loja, the prince seized control of Granada. Abu al-Hasan was unable to recover the capital and withdrew to Málaga, where he established a rival center of power alongside his brother Muhammad al-Zagal.

== Second reign ==
From Málaga, Abu al-Hasan continued to exercise authority over parts of the emirate and conducted further military operations. His brother al-Zagal achieved a significant victory over Castilian forces near Málaga on March 21, 1483. The capture of Boabdil at Lucena in April 1483 temporarily restored Abu al-Hasan's position; the notables of Granada recalled him, and he was re-proclaimed sultan. However, Castile deliberately released Boabdil on terms designed to sustain factional conflict, and civil war continued.

In October 1483, religious authorities issued a legal opinion declaring Boabdil’s claim to the throne illegitimate and prohibiting alliances with Christian rulers. Nevertheless, divisions persisted, and the emirate remained fragmented between competing factions. Military engagements continued across the region in 1483 and 1484, while Castilian forces made further advances, capturing towns such as Álora, Alozaina, and Setenil.

By this time, Abu al-Hasan’s health had deteriorated. He suffered from an illness affecting his eyesight and limiting his ability to lead campaigns. His brother, al-Zagal, assumed greater responsibility for military leadership. In early 1485, al-Zagal seized Almería, which had supported Boabdil, and carried out repressive measures against his supporters, including executions ordered by Abu al-Hasan.

== Overthrow and death ==
The fall of Ronda in May 1485 to Castilian artillery, along with the loss of Cartama, Coin, and several surrounding fortresses, marked a catastrophic contraction of Nasrid territory. Al-Zagal's subsequent return to Granada generated enough popular support for him to depose his blind and infirm brother on June 17, 1485. Abu al-Hasan was sent to Almunecar with Thuraya and their young sons. He died there about three months later, around September 1485, at roughly forty-nine years old.

== Culture ==
Mulhacén, the highest mountain of the Iberian Peninsula, is named after Abu'l-Hasan Ali.

Abu l-Hasan Ali appears as a character, along with Isabel de Solís, in the novel People of the Book by Geraldine Brooks, and Washington Irving's Tales of the Alhambra.

He is also a subject in one of Naseem Hijazi's novel Shaheen which portrays him as brave and a struggler for justice (mujahid) who is not even ready to pay tribute to Christians which he considers as a form of slavery and his conscience doesn't permit him to do so.

== Sources ==
- Boloix Gallardo, Bárbara (2022). "Chapter 6 Granada, Capital of al-Andalus and Core of the Nasrid Kingdom (7th–9th/13th–15th Centuries)". A companion to Islamic Granada. Brill. ISBN 978-90-04-38211-4.
- Catlos, Brian A. (2018). Kingdoms of faith: a new history of Islamic Spain (first ed.). New York: Basic Books. ISBN 978-0-465-05587-6.
- Echevarría, Ana (2009). Knights on the Frontier: The Moorish guard of the Kings of Castile (1410-1467). Boston: Brill. ISBN 978-90-474-2441-3.
- Echevarria, Ana (2018). "Chapter 19. The "Honourable Ladies" of Nasrid Granada". In Woodacre, Elena (ed.). A companion to global queenship. Leeds: ARC Humanities Press. ISBN 978-1-942401-46-9.
- Gallardo, B. B. (2020). "Chapter 1 The Banū Naṣr: The Founders of the Nasrid Kingdom of Granada (Thirteenth–Fifteenth Centuries)". The Nasrid Kingdom of Granada between East and West. Brill.
- Harvey, L. P. (1990). Islamic Spain, 1250 to 1500. Chicago: University of Chicago Press. ISBN 978-0-226-31962-9.
- Latham, J.D. & Fernández-Puertas, A. (1993). "Naṣrids". In Bosworth, C. E.; van Donzel, E.; Heinrichs, W. P. & Pellat, Ch. (eds.). The Encyclopaedia of Islam, Second Edition. Volume VII: Mif–Naz. Leiden: E. J. Brill. pp. 1020–1029. doi:10.1163/1573-3912_islam_COM_0855. ISBN 978-90-04-09419-2.
- Mediano, F. (2010). "The post-Almohad dynasties in al-Andalus and the Maghrib (seventh–ninth/thirteenth–fifteenth centuries)". The New Cambridge History of Islam. Vol. 4. Cambridge University Press.
- O'Callaghan, Joseph F. (2014). The last crusade in the West: Castile and the conquest of Granada. Middle Ages series (1st ed.). Philadelphia: University of Pennsylvania Press. ISBN 978-0-8122-4587-5.
- Vidal Castro, Francisco. "Abu l-Hasan 'Ali". Real Academia de la Historia (in Spanish).

Abu'l-Hasan Ali of Granada Nasrid dynasty Cadet branch of the Banu Khazraj Died: 1485
Regnal titles
Preceded by Sa'd	Sultan of Granada; 1464–1482	Succeeded by Muhammad XI
Preceded by Muhammad XI	Sultan of Granada; 1483–1485	Succeeded by Muhammad XII
