= Ismail IV of Granada =

Emir of Granada (r. 1462–1463)

Ismail IV

Sultan of Granada
- Reign: 1462–1463
- Predecessor: Abu Nasr Sa'd of Granada
- Successor: Abu Nasr Sa'd of Granada
- Died: c. 1463
- House: Nasrid dynasty

Ismail IV (r. 1462–1463) was the twentieth Nasrid ruler of the Emirate of Granada on the Iberian Peninsula. He was a little-known emir who briefly ruled in 1462–1463 during a period of intense instability and factional conflict within the emirate. Of uncertain lineage but identified in Castilian sources as a Nasrid prince who had long resided at the Castilian court, he emerged as a claimant with the backing of the powerful Banu al-Sarraj family and the support of King Enrique IV of Castile. His rise followed the weakening of the reigning emir Abu Nasr Sa'd, whose policies had alienated key factions and provoked widespread unrest. Proclaimed emir by the people of Granada, his position was undermined by continued Castilian military aggression and the heavy political and financial costs of his dependence on Castile. Unable to consolidate his authority, he was deposed within months, after which Sa'd regained the throne. Ismail continued to resist briefly from a regional stronghold before disappearing from the historical record, likely dying in 1463. His short and troubled reign exemplifies the internal divisions and external pressures that characterized the final phase of Nasrid rule in Granada.

== Background ==
His identity and life remain obscure due to the scarcity and ambiguity of available sources. Earlier historians attempted to identify him with other contemporary rulers or figures, but more reliable information provided by the fifteenth-century scholar Ibn Asim makes clear that he was distinct from rulers such as Yusuf V and Ismail III, as well as from other similarly named claimants. Castilian chronicles refer to him as “Ysmael,” a rendering of his Arabic name, and describe him as an infante, indicating his status as a Nasrid prince. However, his precise lineage within the Nasrid dynasty is unknown but he may have been Yusuf V's uncle.

Sources also emphasize that he spent a considerable period in Castile before his political emergence, suggesting that he was already a mature adult when he entered the turbulent political arena of mid-fifteenth-century Granada. This aligns with a broader pattern of Nasrid princes who sought refuge at the Castilian court during periods of internal strife. The Christian monarchs of Castile frequently supported such exiled princes, maintaining them as potential claimants to the Granadan throne. This strategy allowed Castile to intervene in Nasrid affairs, fostering instability and civil war while ensuring that any successful claimant would likely become a vassal of the Castilian crown.

His first possible appearance in the historical record occurred in 1453, following the death of Muhammad IX and the succession of Mohammad X. Opposition to Mohammad X quickly arose and some factions reportedly supported an alternative claimant named Ismail, who had resided for a long time at the Castilian court. Although it is uncertain whether this individual was Ismail IV, the circumstances closely match what is known of him. In any case, this early challenge failed, and Muhammad X retained power.

== Rebellion ==
A decade later, conditions in Granada again created an opportunity for Ismail. The reign of Abu Nasr Sa'd was marked by internal tensions and external pressure from Castile. In 1462, Sa'd executed prominent members of the powerful Banu al-Sarraj (Abencerraje) family, including leading officials such as his grand vizier Mufarrij and Yusuf ibn al-Sarraj. This violent purge provoked the remaining members of the clan to flee, many taking refuge in Malaga. From there, they sought to challenge Sa'd by promoting an alternative claimant to the throne.

The exiled Banu al-Sarraj turned to Ismail, who was still in Castile, and secured the support of King Enrique IV. This alliance reflects a recurring pattern in Nasrid politics: a rival aristocratic faction in Granada, a claimant prince backed by Castile, and direct or indirect intervention by the Castilian monarchy. With Enrique IV's patronage, Ismail traveled to Malaga accompanied by a contingent of approximately two hundred Castilian knights. The Banu al-Sarraj simultaneously mobilized their supporters across al-Andalus, consolidating a broad base of opposition to Sa'd.

This uprising quickly escalated into a wider conflict. Forces from Gibraltar joined the rebellion, leaving the city vulnerable. Castilian nobles, including the Duke of Medina Sidonia and the Count of Arcos, seized the opportunity to capture Gibraltar in August 1462. Meanwhile, Ismail and his allies succeeded in extending their control over parts of the western Nasrid realm. Important cities such as Malaga, Ronda, and Setenil came under his influence, strengthening his position as a serious contender for power.

Sa'd now faced pressure on multiple fronts: from Castilian incursions, from Ismail's expanding rebellion, and from growing dissatisfaction among the population. The situation in Granada itself became increasingly unstable. When the Castilian constable Miguel Lucas de Iranzo advanced into the fertile Vega de Granada in August 1462, Saad hesitated to leave the capital to confront him, fearing that his absence would invite a coup within the Alhambra. This hesitation further undermined his authority and contributed to the perception of his weakness.

== Reign (1462–1463) ==
Eventually, public discontent reached a tipping point. In or around September 1462, the people of Granada deposed Sa'd and proclaimed Ismail as emir. His brief and troubled reign faced the same structural challenges that had undermined his predecessor. Despite the hopes invested in him, Ismail inherited an emirate weakened by internal divisions and external threats.

Almost immediately, Ismail's rule suffered a major setback. On September 30, 1462, the strategic city of Archidona fell to Castilian forces after a siege that had begun under Sa'd. The loss of this important stronghold caused significant alarm among the Andalusians and highlighted the vulnerability of the Nasrid state. It also demonstrated that Castilian forces were willing to continue their military campaigns regardless of the change in leadership, even though Ismail had come to power with Castilian support.

In October 1462, prominent Castilian commanders launched a raid from Jaen into the Vega de Granada. Their forces ravaged the countryside and advanced to the vicinity of the capital, apparently seeking to provoke or challenge the new emir. Faced with this aggression, Ismail chose diplomacy over confrontation. Rather than engaging militarily, he sent a formal letter to open negotiations. Through an intermediary, he reminded the Castilian leaders that he owed his throne to their king and requested that they refrain from attacking while he formalized his vassalage and established a truce. He also warned that continued hostilities might drive the population back into the camp of the deposed Sa'd. Despite these arguments, the Castilian commanders persisted in their campaign of devastation as they withdrew.

A formal truce was eventually concluded between Granada and Castile. Enrique IV appears to have accepted peace for pragmatic reasons, including the need to address conflicts elsewhere, particularly with Navarre, and the financial benefits derived from Nasrid tribute payments. The agreement was limited in scope, lasting only seven months, from November 1462 to June 1463, and did little to stabilize Ismail's position. In fact, the terms of the truce may have contributed to his downfall. The obligations imposed by Castile, likely including tribute payments and political concessions, placed a heavy burden on an already strained society. As a result, Ismail struggled to consolidate his authority. By late 1462 or early 1463, he was overthrown, and Sa'd was restored to the throne.

Following his deposition, Ismail did not immediately disappear from the political scene. He retreated to the fortress of Illora, accompanied by his supporters from the Banu al-Sarraj. From this base, he continued to resist Sa'd and maintain a degree of opposition into late 1463. However, he likely died around the close of that year, as no further references to him appear in the sources.

== Sources ==
- Boloix Gallardo, Bárbara (2022). "Chapter 6 Granada, Capital of al-Andalus and Core of the Nasrid Kingdom (7th–9th/13th–15th Centuries)". A companion to Islamic Granada. Brill. ISBN 978-90-04-38211-4.
- Catlos, Brian A. (2018). Kingdoms of faith: a new history of Islamic Spain (first ed.). New York: Basic Books. ISBN 978-0-465-05587-6.
- Echevarría, Ana (2009). Knights on the Frontier: The Moorish guard of the Kings of Castile (1410-1467). Boston: Brill. ISBN 978-90-474-2441-3.
- Echevarria, Ana (2018). "Chapter 19. The "Honourable Ladies" of Nasrid Granada". In Woodacre, Elena (ed.). A companion to global queenship. Leeds: ARC Humanities Press. ISBN 978-1-942401-46-9.
- Gallardo, B. B. (2020). "Chapter 1 The Banū Naṣr: The Founders of the Nasrid Kingdom of Granada (Thirteenth–Fifteenth Centuries)". The Nasrid Kingdom of Granada between East and West. Brill.
- Harvey, L. P. (1990). Islamic Spain, 1250 to 1500. Chicago: University of Chicago Press. ISBN 978-0-226-31962-9.
- Latham, J.D. & Fernández-Puertas, A. (1993). "Naṣrids". In Bosworth, C. E.; van Donzel, E.; Heinrichs, W. P. & Pellat, Ch. (eds.). The Encyclopaedia of Islam, Second Edition. Volume VII: Mif–Naz. Leiden: E. J. Brill. pp. 1020–1029. doi:10.1163/1573-3912_islam_COM_0855. ISBN 978-90-04-09419-2.
- Mediano, F. (2010). "The post-Almohad dynasties in al-Andalus and the Maghrib (seventh–ninth/thirteenth–fifteenth centuries)". The New Cambridge History of Islam. Vol. 4. Cambridge University Press.
- O'Callaghan, Joseph F. (2014). The last crusade in the West: Castile and the conquest of Granada. Middle Ages series (1st ed.). Philadelphia: University of Pennsylvania Press. ISBN 978-0-8122-4587-5.
- Vidal Castro, Francisco. "Ismail IV". Real Academia de la Historia (in Spanish).

Ismail IV of Granada Nasrid dynasty Died: 1463
Regnal titles
Preceded by Sa'd	Sultan of Granada; 1462–1463	Succeeded by Sa'd
