= Emirate of Granada =

State in the Iberian Peninsula, 1232–1492

Coordinates: 37°10′39″N 03°35′24″W

- 1232–1492
- Royal banner Coat of arms
- Motto: Wala ghaliba illa Allah (Arabic: ولا غالب إلا الله, lit. 'There is no victor but God')
- Territory of the Nasrid Kingdom from the 13th to 15th centuries
- Status: Tributary state of the Crown of Castile (intermittent)
- Capital: Granada
- Common languages: Official language: Classical Arabic; Vernacular languages: Andalusi Arabic; Berber
- Religion: Sunni Islam (official); School: Maliki; Creed: Ash’ari; Minorities: Judaism, Christianity (Catholicism)
- Government: Hereditary monarchy
- Sultan
  - 1232–1273: Muhammad I
  - 1487–1492: Muhammad XI
- Historical era: Late Middle Ages
  - Established: 1232
  - Castilian conquest: 1492
Preceded by	Succeeded by
Almohad Caliphate	Kingdom of Granada (Crown of Castile)
- Today part of: Spain; Gibraltar; Morocco

The Emirate of Granada, also known as the Nasrid Kingdom of Granada or the Sultanate of Granada, was an Islamic polity in the southern Iberian Peninsula during the Late Middle Ages, ruled by the Nasrid dynasty. It was the last independent Muslim state in Western Europe.

Muslims had been present in the Iberian Peninsula, which they called Al-Andalus, since 711. By the late 12th century, following the expansion of Christian kingdoms in the north, the area of Muslim control had been reduced to the southern parts of the peninsula governed by the Almohad Caliphate. After Almohad control retreated in 1228, the ambitious Muhammad I Ibn al-Ahmar rose to power and established the Nasrid dynasty in control of a sizeable portion of this territory, roughly corresponding to the modern Spanish provinces of Granada, Almería, and Málaga. By 1250, the Nasrid emirate was the last independent Muslim polity in the peninsula.

The emirate generally existed as a tributary state of the rising Crown of Castile, though it frequently warred with the latter and with other neighboring states over control of its frontier regions. Despite its precarious position, Granada enjoyed considerable cultural and economic prosperity for over two centuries and the Nasrids became one of the longest-lived Muslim dynasties in the Iberian Peninsula. (Note: The dynasty is counted by some references as the longest-reigning in al-Andalus, from 1232 to 1492 (approximately 260 years). Some sources count the reign of the Umayyads of Córdoba as slightly longer than Nasrid rule in Granada, counting from its establishment in 756 to the caliphate's final dissolution in 1031 (275 years).) The famed Alhambra palace complex was built during this period. The population of the emirate, swollen by refugees from the north, was more homogenously Muslim and Arabic-speaking than in earlier Muslim states on the peninsula, with a Jewish minority also present.

The political and cultural apogee of Nasrid Granada was in the 14th century, particularly in the second reign of Muhammad V. After this period, internal dynastic conflicts escalated. After 1479, Granada faced a united Castile and Aragon under the Catholic Monarchs intent on conquering it. In 1491, after the decade-long Granada War, the emirate was forced to capitulate. Muhammad XI, the last Nasrid ruler, formally surrendered Granada in January 1492, marking the end of independent Muslim rule in the Iberian Peninsula.

== History ==
=== Background ===
Since the Muslim conquest of 711, much of the Iberian Peninsula had been under Muslim control. At its greatest geographical extent, Muslim control extended to most of the peninsula and part of present-day southern France. By the 10th century, under the Caliphate of Córdoba, the region was one of the most prosperous and advanced in Europe. Conflict with the northern Christian kingdoms was recurrent, while mounting civil strife led to the fragmentation of al-Andalus into smaller Taifa states in the early 11th century. This marked a precipitous decline in the power of Iberian Muslim polities and facilitated the centuries-long Christian Reconquista and the recurrent conquest of al-Andalus by North African dynasties based in what is now Morocco, commencing with the Almoravids in the late 11th century and followed by the Almohads in the mid 12th century.

The Almohad regime grew more unstable following the defeat of the Almohads at the Battle of Las Navas de Tolosa in 1212 by a coalition of Christian kingdoms from the north. In 1228, the Almohad caliph Idris al-Ma'mun, wishing to focus on retaining control of the Maghreb (North Africa), decided to abandon al-Andalus. The resultant power vacuum allowed local leaders to carve out their own small states, creating a third period of Taifa kingdoms. Of these leaders, the most powerful was initially Ibn Hud of Murcia (r. 1228–1238), who had rebelled against the last Almohad governors and managed to unite much of what remained of al-Andalus. However, in 1231 Ibn Hud was defeated by the Leónese and lost control of Badajoz and the surrounding area, which compromised his authority and reputation as a reliable defender of al-Andalus.

=== Establishment of Nasrid rule ===
One of Ibn Hud's foremost military commanders had been a man called Muhammad ibn Yusuf ibn Nasr, commonly known as Ibn al-Ahmar, who was born in Arjona. His position in the army reportedly aroused the envy of others who accused him of planning a coup against Ibn Hud, forcing him to flee to Arjona. Ibn al-Ahmar's origins were likely modest, but he seems to have acquired a reputation for piety and as a successful military leader. With Ibn Hud's position weakened by his defeats, the inhabitants of the Arjona area declared Ibn al-Ahmar as their emir after Friday prayers on 16 July 1232 (26 Ramadan 629 AH).

Ibn al-Ahmar was related to the Nasrids on his father's side and to the Banu Ashqilula on his mother's side. These two families thus formed the initial core of his small army, along with other volunteers and Andalusi soldiers who had previously served the Almohads. Other prominent families, such as the Banu 'l-Mawl of Cordoba and the Banu Sinadid of Jaén, joined them over the next years and thereafter remained attached to the Nasrid court.

With the Reconquista in full swing, the Christian kingdoms of Castile and Aragon – under kings Ferdinand III and James I, respectively – made major conquests across al-Andalus, which the Taifa kingdoms attempted in vain to resist. Ibn al-Ahmar's new status attracted support from many Muslim towns in the region hoping for protection. The Nasrid kingdom thus took shape initially by communities consenting to Ibn al-Ahmar's authority, rather than being submitted by conquest. Jaén, Guadix, and Baeza accepted his authority quickly in 1232, while Almería accepted him 1238 and Malaga did so in 1238 or 1239.

Ibn al-Ahmar had more difficulty being recognized in larger cities, where his rule was seen as too harsh. Cordoba accepted him in 1232 for a few months and Seville accepted him for only a month in 1234. He was temporarily forced to acknowledge the authority of Ibn Hud again in 1234, in return for the latter's recognition of his authority over Arjona and Jaén.

Towards 1236, the Castilian offensive intensified and the strategic situation became increasingly precarious for al-Andalus. On multiple occasions, Ibn al-Ahmar responded by aligning himself with Ferdinand III, even against other Muslim rulers. When Ferdinand conquered Cordoba in 1236, Ibn al-Ahmar was his ally.

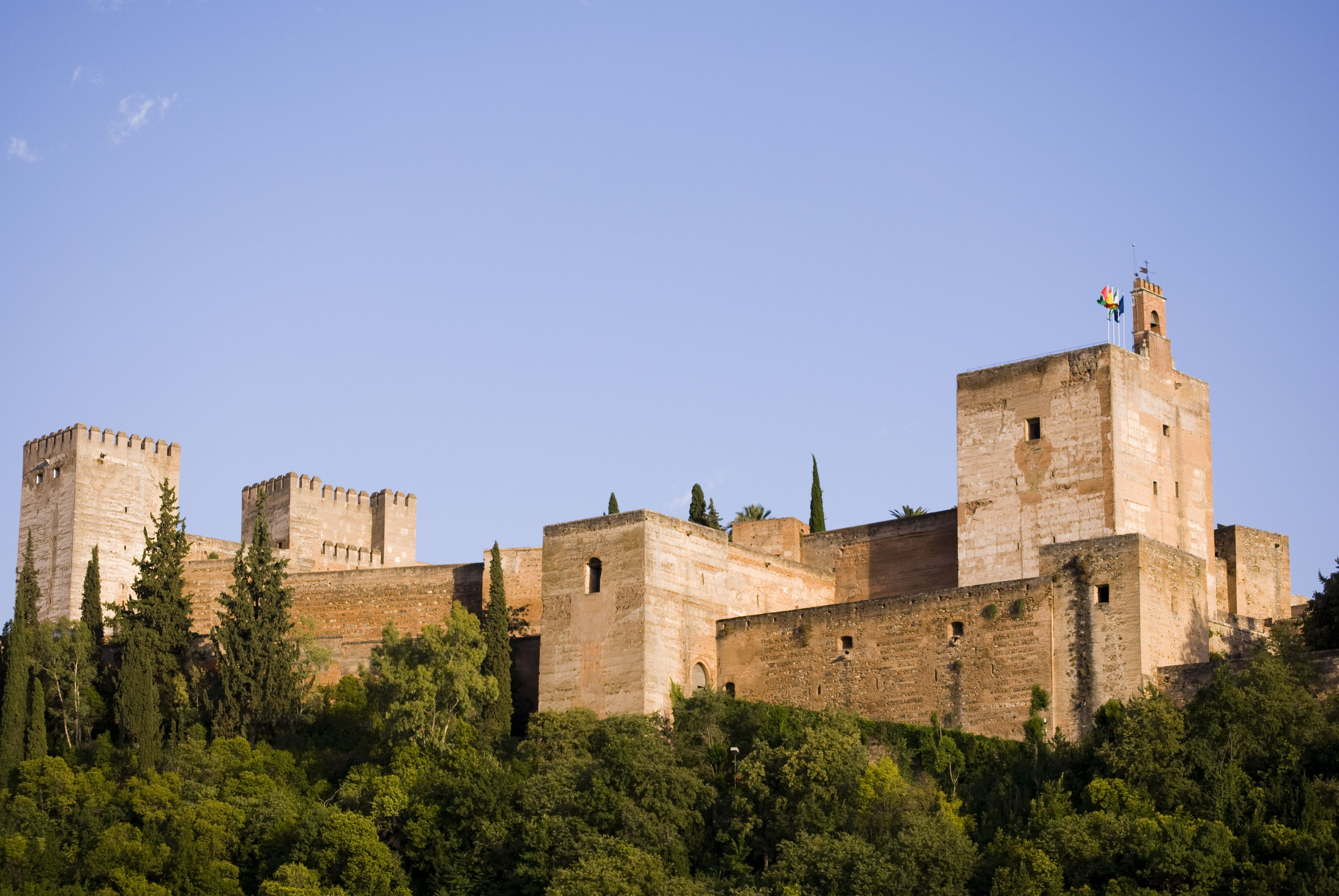
The Alhambra was the Nasrid citadel and residence in Granada. The Alcazaba fortress, seen here, is its oldest part and was probably Ibn al-Ahmar's initial residence.

In Granada, which was under the authority of Ibn Hud, the local Banu Khalid family led a propaganda campaign on behalf of the Nasrids. A revolt successfully stormed the city's citadel on 17 April 1238 (1 Ramadan 635 AH). (Note: Some authors place the taking of Granada in 1237 rather than 1238.) Ibn al-Ahmar was then officially declared the new ruler with the help of Abu l-Hasan Ali al-Ru'ayni, a former secretary of Ibn Hud. On hearing of this, Ibn al-Ahmar quickly came to the city. After taking direct control of it, he decided to make it his new capital instead of Jaén, as Granada was a more important city in al-Andalus and its location was more strategic: it was geographically more defensible, farther from the Castilian frontier, and had better access to the sea. Additionally, he chose to move the ruler's residence from the Old Citadel (al-Qasaba al-Qadima) of the Zirids on the Albaicín hill to a new citadel he founded on the Sabika hill to the south. This became the Alhambra (al-Qal'a al-Hamra, the 'Red Citadel').

Despite Ibn al-Ahmar's earlier alliance with Castile, Ferdinand III still attacked and captured Arjona in 1244. In the summer of 1245 he began the siege of Jaén, a more important and well-fortified town. Ibn al-Ahmar initially supported the defenders, but in March 1246 he met with Ferdinand and negotiated a new treaty. In the Treaty of Jaén, referred to in Arabic sources as al-silm al-kabir ('the great peace'), Ibn al-Ahmar agreed to surrender Jaén and to become Ferdinand's vassal, while Castile recognized the existence of the Emirate of Granada as a state and agreed to a twenty-year truce. In 1248, Ibn al-Ahmar actively aided Ferdinand in his successful siege of Seville by sending his own military contingent to assist the Castilians.

The fall of Seville and the long-term truce with Castile effectively established the political map of the region until the 15th century. The peace allowed the Nasrid emirate to consolidate its territory and build up its governing institutions. While Granada's vassalage is emphasized by Christian sources, in practice Ibn al-Ahmar pledged allegiance to different suzerains at different times, depending on what was tactically advantageous. Aside from Ibn Hud in 1234, on subsequent occasions he also declared his allegiance to the Abbasid Caliph in Baghdad (before 1244), to the Almohad caliph Abd al-Wahid II al-Rashid (also before 1244), and to the Hafsids in Tunis (in 1242 and 1264). Arabic sources do not mention his vassalage to Castile. In the long-term, the Treaty of Jaén still formed a basis for Nasrid relations with Castile, but the peace was often interrupted by wars, after which vassalage was often renewed.

=== Further conflicts and consolidation ===
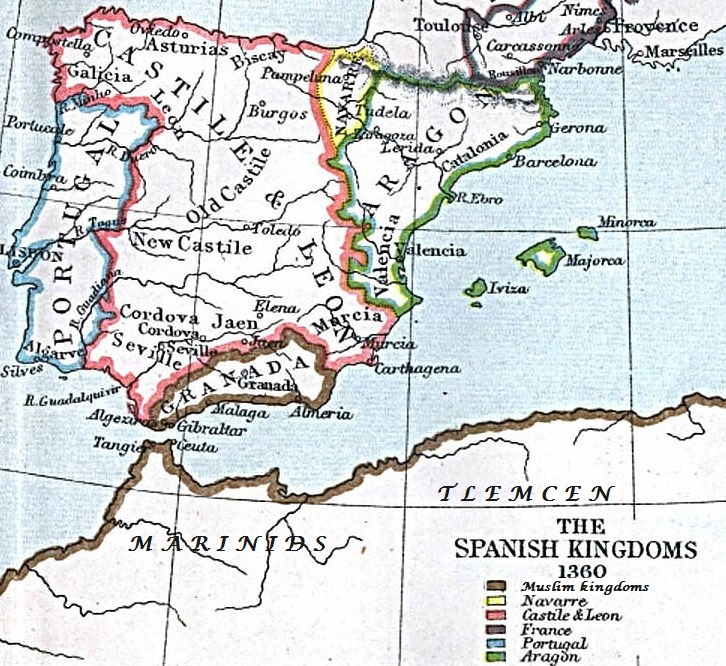
Granada and its surrounding states in 1360

The political history of the emirate was turbulent and intertwined with that of its neighbors. The Nasrids sometimes provided refuge or military aid to Castilian kings and noblemen, even against other Muslim states, while in turn the Castilians provided refuge and aid to some Nasrid emirs against other Nasrid rivals. On other occasions the Nasrids attempted to leverage the aid of the North African Marinids to ward off Castile, although Marinid interventions in the peninsula ended after Battle of Rio Salado (1340).

The population of the emirate was swelled by Muslim refugees from the territories newly conquered by Castile and Aragon, resulting in a small yet densely populated territory which was more uniformly Muslim and Arabic-speaking than before. The Alhambra palace complex, which Ibn al-Ahmar founded, was progressively expanded under his successors.

==== The Mudéjar rebellion ====
Ibn al-Ahmar reigned with relative peace and stability until 1264, when the Mudéjar revolt took place in Castile, lasting until 1266. Mudéjar is a term used to refer to the Muslims who lived under the rule of the Christian kingdoms at this time, among whom different communities lived under different circumstances. The rebellion of 1264 was wide-ranging but it did not involve the Muslims in the old territories of Castile to the north, who lived in stable communities and were relatively well-integrated into Castilian society. Instead, it involved the Muslim inhabitants of the Guadalquivir valley and of Castilian Andalucia, for whom the Castilian conquests of the 13th century had represented a major and still recent disruption of their communities. Some of these communities, like those of Murcia and Niebla, had been allowed to govern themselves under Castilian overlordship, while others were subjected to forced displacement and lived under harsher conditions. It's unclear whether Ibn al-Ahmar played a role in inciting the rebellion, but he did support it.

The rebellion represents the last serious attempt to reverse the Castilian conquests of the 13th century and break the Christian hold on the southern Iberian Peninsula. The conditions for this must have appeared favourable at the time. Ibn al-Ahmar was enjoying good relations with the Hafsids (based in present-day Tunisia) and the Marinids (based in present-day Morocco), while the king of Castile, Alfonso X, was preoccupied with other matters. Initially, the Marinids even sent a contingent to assist the rebellion, landing at Tarifa. A number of cities fell into Muslim hands, including Jerez, Utrera, Lebrija, Arcos, and Medina Sidonia. Alfonso X also had to contend with revolts by some of the Castilian nobles. However, his forces progressively took back control. In some cases, as in Jerez, this involved a full siege and a fresh campaign of conquest. In the end, the Muslim kingdoms of Granada and North Africa did not provide extensive assistance. By 1265, the Castilians were invading the Vega (valley) of Granada and Ibn al-Ahmar was forced to renegotiate peace. By the time the rebellion was over, the surviving Mudéjar inhabitants of Andalucia were mostly expelled and their towns resettled by Christians from other parts of Castile.

==== Conflict with the Banu Ashqilula and Marinid intervention ====
Ibn al-Ahmar's position was further threatened by the rebellion of the Banu Ashqilula in 1266. The latter were probably alienated by his decision to establish a line of succession through his sons Muhammad and Yusuf, which would distance them from the throne. They occupied Malaga and turned to Alfonso X for aid. Granada and Castile became embroiled in conflict and in each other's affairs, with Ibn al-Ahmar also supporting new Castilian rebels in 1272. The situation was not resolved by the time Ibn al-Ahmar died in 1273 and was succeeded by his son, Muhammad II (r. 1273–1302).

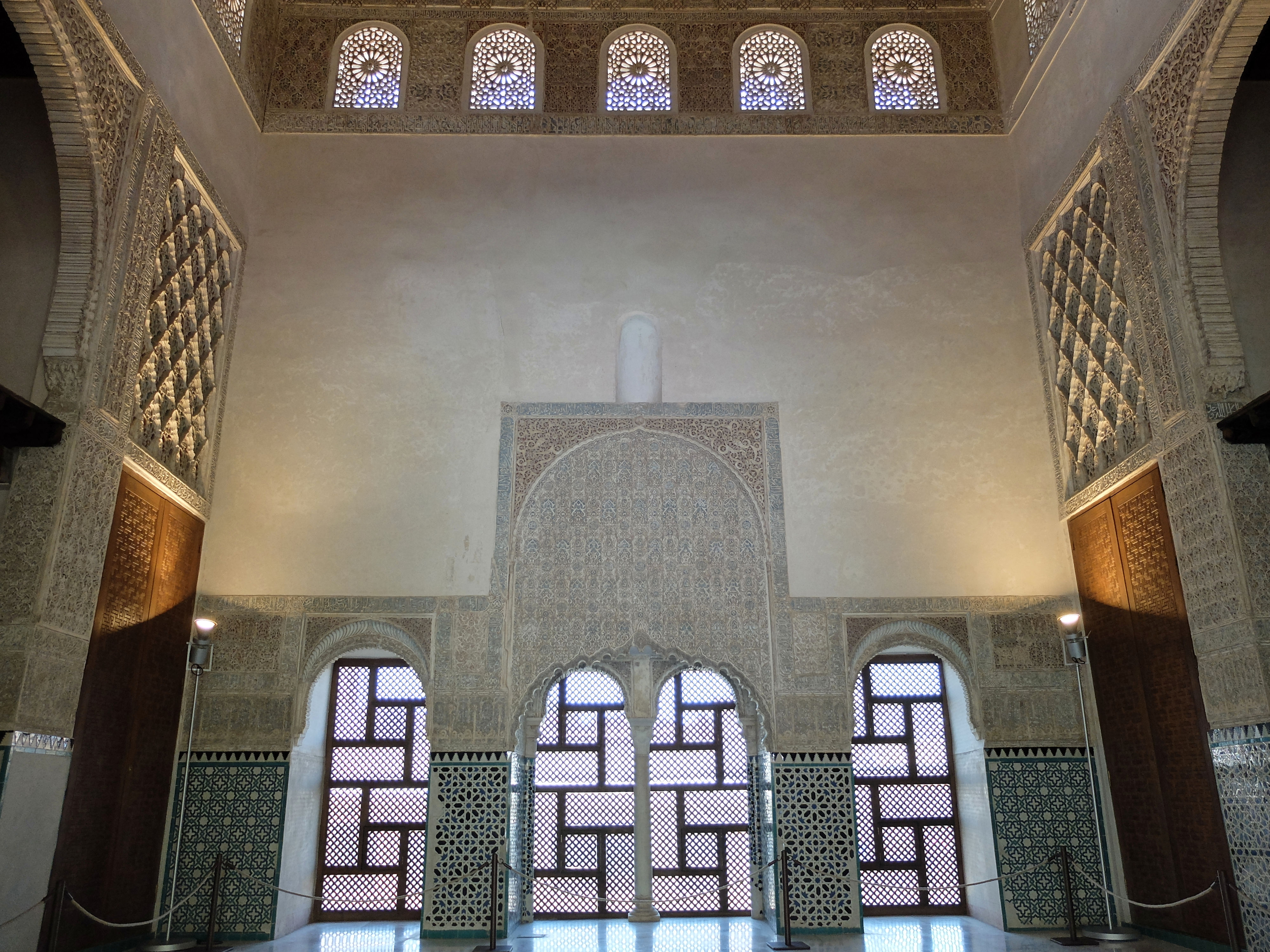
The Cuarto Real de Santo Domingo in Granada, a palace dated to the time of Muhammad II

During Muhammad II's reign, a long-term pattern of diplomacy and geopolitical competition became evident, with the Nasrids, Castilians, and Marinids each playing with or against each other at various times. Each of these dynasties was also faced by other internal and external enemies. The Nasrids thus sought to forge a path forward by making or breaking alliances according to circumstances. Muhammad II also made major changes to the army of his emirate. In addition to local recruits, he recruited Zenata Berbers from North Africa, who thenceforth composed the most important element of the army and were known as the Ghazis, or Warriors of the Faith. Many were political exiles from the Marinid kingdom, including some from the Marinid family itself, and some were failed rebels against the Marinid sultan Abu Yusuf (r. 1258–1286).

Muhammad II's first preoccupation was the Banu Ashqilula, who retained Malaga and even received some recognition from Alfonso X and from Abu Yusuf. He sought assistance from the Marinid sultan and offered him a base on the Iberian Peninsula. Abu Yusuf, who had recently captured Tangier and Ceuta on the southern side of the Strait of Gibraltar, thus occupied Algeciras and Tarifa in 1275, along with Ronda further inland. While conducting damaging raids into Christian territory, he invited both Muhammad II and the Banu Ashqilula leaders (Abu Muhammad ibn Ashqilula of Malaga and Abu Ishaq of Guadix) to join him. In 1278, the Banu Ashqilula decided to give Malaga to Abu Yusuf, who now occupied this city as well. As a result, Muhammad II felt disillusioned and now saw the Marinids as a greater threat. He made an alliance with Alfonso X and incited the Zayyanids of Tlemcen, led by Yaghmurasan, to attack the Marinids. While Alfonso X blockaded Malaga by sea, Muhammad II convinced the Marinid governor of Malaga to surrender the city to him in 1279. After a Castilian attack against Algeciras failed, however, Alfonso X made peace with the Marinids. In 1281, the Marinids, the Castilians, and the Banu Ashqilula joined forces to attack Granada. Muhammad II's forces managed to repel the attack, thanks in large part to the effectiveness of his new Zenata troops. The deaths of Alfonso X in 1284 and of Abu Yusuf in 1286 relieved the pressure on Granada. In 1288, Muhammad II was able to finally expel the last Banu Ashqilula from Guadix and they fled to Morocco afterward.

The Marinids, now led by Abu Ya'qub, still retained Tarifa and Algeciras. In 1292, the new Castilian king, Sancho IV, made an alliance with Granada, Tlemcen, and Portugal with the intention of removing the Marinids from the Iberian Peninsula. He captured Tarifa in October 1292. Muhammad II expected the city to be returned to Nasrid control after this, but Sancho IV refused to cede it and the city thus remained under Christian control permanently. When a Marinid attempt to retake Tarifa failed in 1294, Abu Yaq'ub decided to withdraw from the Iberian Peninsula completely and focus on his campaigns in the Maghreb instead. He ceded Algeciras and Ronda to the Nasrids, thus restoring some of Granada's former territories.

==== Nasrid offensive against Ceuta ====
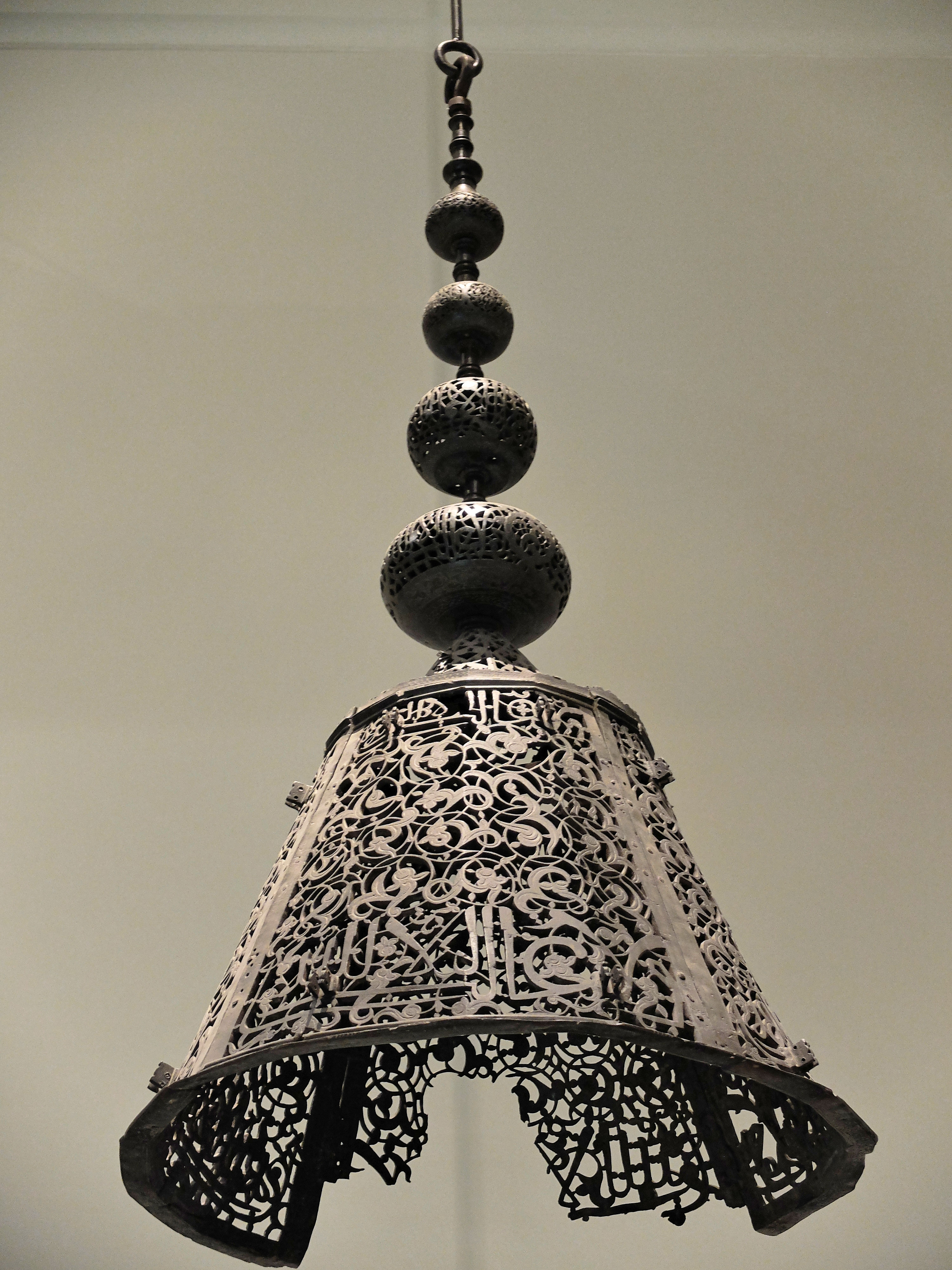
A bronze lamp from the main mosque of Alhambra, dated to 1305 during the reign of Muhammad III

After Sancho IV's death in 1295, Muhammad II spent the rest of his reign going on the offensive against Castile, taking advantage of the weakness of the young new king, Ferdinand IV. He nurtured an alliance with James II of Aragon, raided Castilian territory, and recaptured two frontier forts at Alcaudete and Quesada. After his death in 1302, he was succeeded by his son, Muhammad III (r. 1302–1309), who largely continued the same policies. Eventually, when Ferdinand IV solidified his control over his kingdom in 1306, Muhammad III changed diplomatic direction by making peace with him and resuming tribute payments to Castile. At the Alhambra, Muhammad III erected the Partal Palace, which is the oldest palace still standing within the complex today, and commissioned the construction of the Alhambra's main mosque (no longer extant).

Muhammad III then set his aims on controlling the Strait of Gibraltar. With the help of Uthman ibn Abi al-Ula, a rebel Marinid prince, he incited a rebellion against the Marinids in Ceuta and in the Gomara Mountains of Morocco. In 1306 or 1307, he captured Ceuta. He secured an alliance with Tlemcen, which was under a Marinid siege at the time, and proceeded to occupy Asilah, Larache, and Ksar es-Seghir along the Moroccan coast. When the Marinid sultan Abu Ya'qub died in 1307, Uthman ibn Abi al-Ula declared himself sultan in his stead, but his bid for the throne failed as Abu Thabit, Abu Ya'qub's grandson, lifted the siege of Tlemcen and returned to retake Asilah and Ksar es-Seghir. Uthman took refuge in Granada and entered into the service of the Nasrids as commander of the Ghazis, a position which his family continued to hold for much of that century. Abu Thabit died in 1308, before he was able to retake Ceuta from the Nasrids.

The Nasrid successes in the Strait of Gibraltar aroused concerns in Castile and Aragon. Ferdinand IV and James II agreed to launch a joint invasion of Granada, planning to divide the Nasrid territories between them. At the same time, internal turmoil rocked the Nasrid state. A coup d'état in March 1309 forced Muhammad III to abdicate in favour of his brother, Nasr (r. 1309–1314). In the summer, Castile captured Gibraltar with the aid of Aragonese ships, Aragon laid siege to Almería, and a rebellion returned Ceuta to Marinid control. With Ceuta no longer under Granada's hold, Nasr was able to make peace with the new Marinid sultan, Abu al-Rabi, and solicit his aid in the defense of Algeciras. Both Algeciras and Almería successfully held out until 1310, when the Aragonese retreated. After managing to capture a few frontier forts, Castile's attacks also ended with the death of Ferdinand IV in 1312.

==== Challenges under Isma'il I and Muhammad IV ====
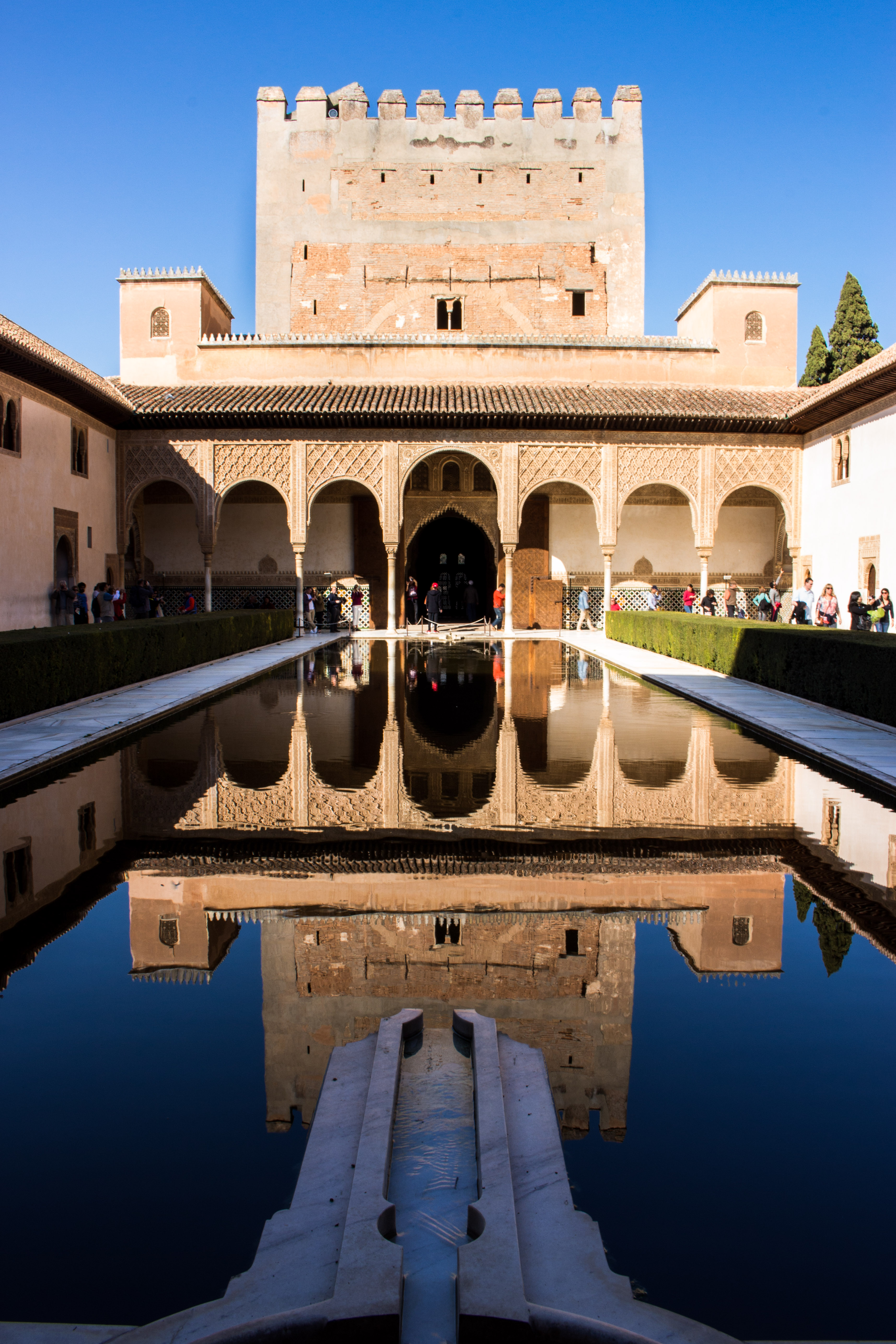
The Comares Palace, seen here inside the Alhambra, was originally constructed by Isma'il I

In 1312, Nasr's cousin, Isma'il, launched a rebellion with the help of Uthman ibn Abi al-Ula. In response, Nasr sought assistance from Castile, but this only made him more unpopular. In February 1314, the city opened its gates to the rebels and Nasr was forced to abdicate and retire to Guadix. Isma'il I (r. 1314–1325) became the new sultan and proved to be an effective ruler. From Guadix, Nasr caused him trouble and secured an alliance with Castile, which was then under the reign of Alfonso XI, a child overseen by two regents, Pedro and Juan. Border conflicts ensued until 1319, when Castile launched a major invasion and besieged Granada. In the Battle of the Vega that followed, Granada scored one of its most decisive victories ever against the Castilians. Isma'il I went on to recover some towns, including Baeza and Martos.

Isma'il I was assassinated by a cousin in July 1325 and was succeeded by his son, Muhammad IV (r. 1325–1333), who was still a child. During this time, the emirate was shaken by more internal turmoil, due in particular to the intrigues of the Ghazis, led by Uthman ibn Abi al-Ula and his family. In 1327–28, they assassinated the vizier, Ibn Mahruq, and took effective control of the young emir. Meanwhile, Alfonso XI, now grown up, was eager to establish himself as a crusader. Aided by volunteers from Northern Europe, he led his army on multiple offensives against Granada, culminating in the successful siege of Teba in 1330.

Muhammad IV reacted to the Castilian victories by seeking an alliance with the Marinids, to whom he ceded Ronda and Algeciras again in 1327 and 1328, respectively, to use as a base. In 1332, he visited Fez to personally seek the intervention of the Marinid sultan, Abu al-Hasan (r. 1331–1348), against Castile. Abu al-Hasan pledged his support and sent an army to Algeciras in 1333. It besieged Gibraltar and captured it in June. By August, a Castilian counteroffensive had failed and Gibraltar remained in Muslim control thereafter until 1462. On 25 August 1333, Muhammad IV was assassinated by the sons of Uthman ibn Abi al-Ula, who were opposed to his policy of close relations with the Marinids.

=== Apogee ===
==== Yusuf I and the Battle of Rio Salado ====
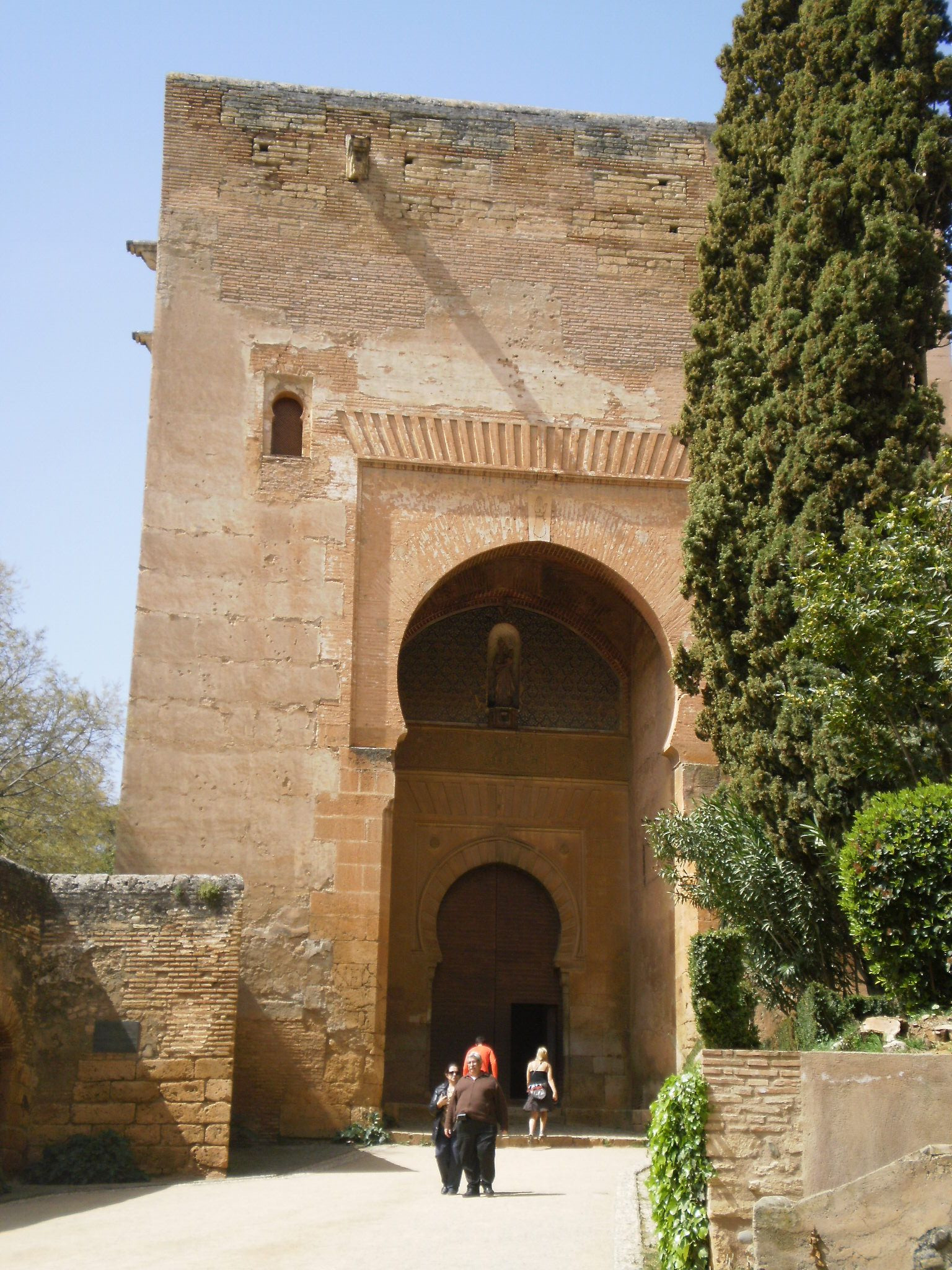
Bab al-Shari'a (known today as the Puerta de la Justicia), a monumental gate to the Alhambra built in 1348, during the reign of Yusuf I

Muhammad IV was succeeded by his brother, Yusuf I (r. 1333–1354), whose reign would mark the beginning of the Nasrid emirate's golden age. He began by expelling the Banu'l-Ula (the family of Uthman ibn Abi al-Ula) from his realm, in revenge for the killing of his brother, and placed another Marinid family member, Yahya ibn Umar ibn Raḥḥu, in charge of the Ghazis.

Alfonso XI remained a threat and the war between Castile and the Marinids and Nasrids continued, culminating in the Battle of Rio Salado in 1340. At sea, the Marinid navy, assisted by Hafsid ships, defeated the Castilian fleet, assisted by Catalan ships. On land, however, the combined forces of Castile and Portugal, along with volunteers from elsewhere in Europe, decisively defeated the Marinid and Nasrid forces at the Salado River, near Tarifa. The Christian victory was a major milestone, allowing Castile to capture important towns on the frontier, such as Priego and Alcala la Real in 1342. Castile also captured Algeciras in 1344 after a difficult siege. The siege is also notable for the first recorded use of cannons on the Iberian Peninsula, used in this case by the Muslim defenders. In the long term, the Battle of Rio Salado and the capture of Algeciras put an end to North African military interventions on the Iberian Peninsula, which had been a recurring feature of the conflicts around al-Andalus since the 11th century. This was partly due also to the weakness of the Marinid state, which suffered from internal disarray in the second half of the 14th century.

Spurred by his successes, Alfonso XI went on to begin a new siege of Gibraltar in 1349, but the following year he died from the Black Death that was sweeping through the region. After his death, the siege ended, leaving Gibraltar under Marinid control. Over the following years, Castile became too preoccupied with internal conflicts to be a serious threat to Granada and a relative peace prevailed on the frontier. Despite the military defeats during his reign, Yusuf I seems to have remained trusted by his subjects and faced no serious internal challenges.

==== The reigns of Muhammad V ====
Yusuf I was murdered suddenly in 1354 while at prayer in the main mosque of Granada, by a civilian described as a "madman". He was succeeded by his son, Muhammad V. As Muhammad V was still a minor, state affairs were managed by the hajib (chamberlain) Ridwan, the vizier Ibn al-Khatib, and the commander of the Ghazis, Yahya ibn Umar ibn Raḥḥu. Together, they maintained a policy of peace with Castile, paying tribute and providing military assistance against Castile's enemies when requested, such as against Aragon in 1359.

Muhammad V's reign was interrupted by a palace coup in August 1359 that placed his half-brother, Isma'il II (r. 1359–1360), on the throne. Muhammad V escaped to Guadix, where he had support from the local garrison, but was unable to rally further support from Almería or from Peter I, the Castilian king. He moved on and took refuge at the court of the Marinid ruler Abu Salim in Fez. Isma'il II was soon assassinated in June 1360 by one of his former co-conspirators, a cousin named Abu 'Abd Allah Muhammad, who took the throne as Muhammad VI (r. 1360–1362).

While in Fez, Muhammad V was accompanied by Ibn al-Khatib, who remained loyal to him. Both men also met Ibn Khaldun, who supported their cause. Eventually, Muhammad V secured the support he needed from Peter of Castile. With the support of Peter, of Uthman ibn Yahya ibn Raḥḥu (the son of Yahya ibn Umar ibn Raḥḥu), and of another figure named Ali ibn Kumasha, he returned to the Iberian Peninsula in 1362. Peter and Muhammad V's forces marched on Granada, capturing various towns and the important city of Malaga. With his fortunes turning for the worse, Muhammad VI, reportedly on the advice of his allies, surrendered himself to Peter of Castile and asked for mercy. Peter executed him instead, leaving his ally Muhammad V to reclaim the throne in 1362.

After his return to power, Muhammad V continued his policy of peace with Castile and remained pragmatic. Under his rule, Nasrid diplomacy was exceptionally effective, even amidst the convoluted politics of the Iberian Peninsula in this era. The ongoing Castilian Civil War meant that Castile was not in a position to threaten Granada. Muhammad V initially supported Peter, his former ally, against his rival, Henry of Trastámara. He sent troops to help Peter, which provoked Henry's Aragonese allies into attacking Granadan ships at sea. Muhammad V, in turn, used these Christian attacks to solicit materials and funds from Musa II, the Zayyanid sultan in Tlemcen. When Henry captured Seville in 1366, forcing Peter to flee north, Muhammad V adapted by negotiating a new peace with Henry. When Peter returned to Seville in 1367, Muhammad V again renewed his loyalty to him. When Peter was assassinated in 1369, leaving Castile in further chaos, Muhammad V took advantage of the situation to recapture Algeciras that year. He destroyed the city and from then on its former territory became attached to Gibraltar instead.

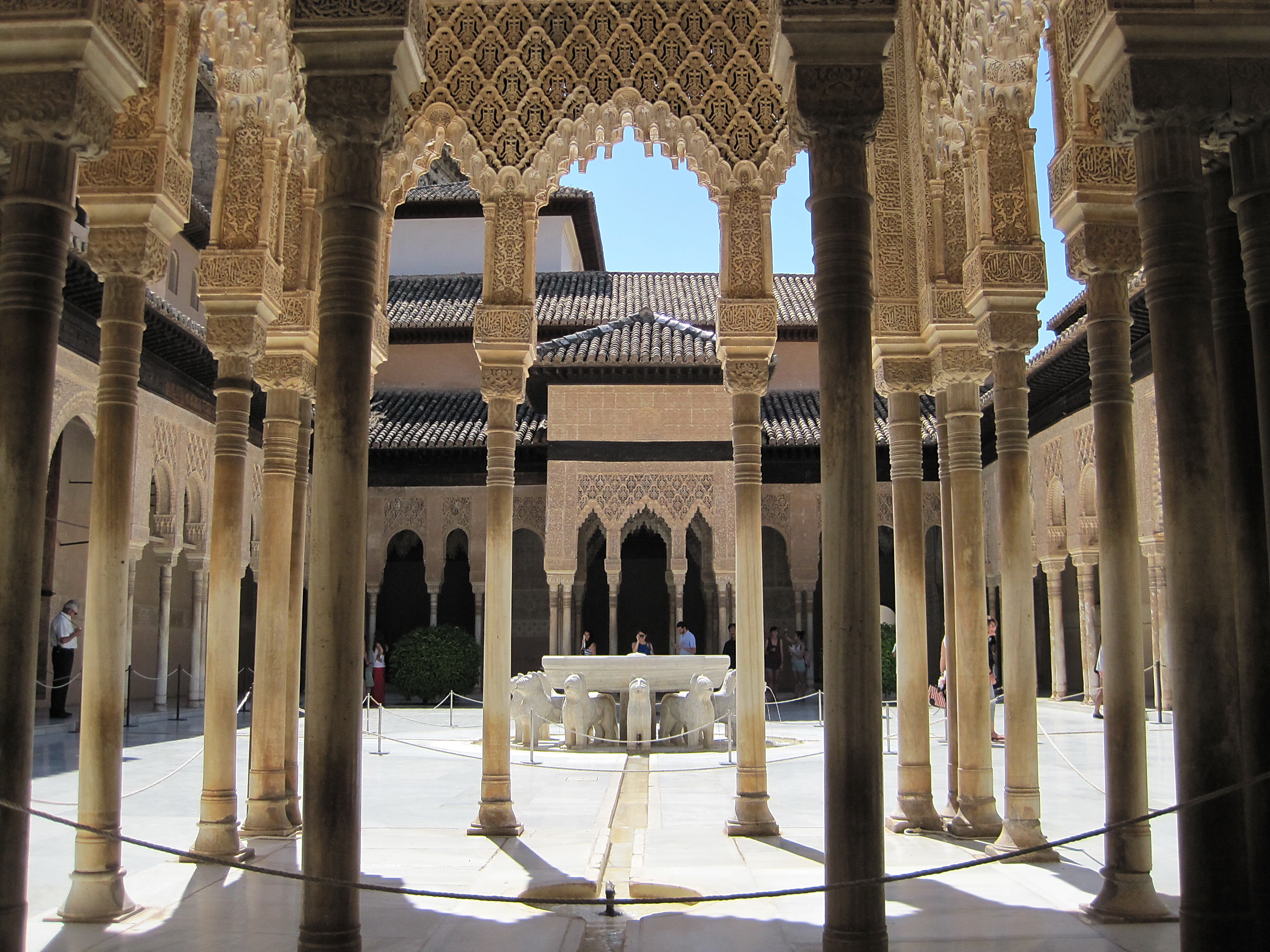
The Court of the Lions, built by Muhammad V after 1362

Domestically, Muhammad V eliminated the office of the shaykh al-ghuzat, the chief of the Ghazis, in 1370, placing the Zenata troops under the direct command of the Nasrid family for the first time. The emirate was relatively free of internal conflict during his second reign. This period also marked the pinnacle of Nasrid culture. The vizier Ibn al-Khatib (d. 1375) was a major figure of literature, as was his successor, Ibn Zamrak (d. 1392). In the Alhambra, Muhammad V undertook major construction projects, including the Palace of the Lions. For the general population in the city, he sponsored the construction of a hospital (maristan), the Maristan of Granada, between 1365 and 1367. His reign was also a high point of cultural exchange with the Castilian court of Peter in Seville, who built his palace in the Alcazar in the style of Granada's art and architecture.

=== Decline and fall ===
==== Political instability ====
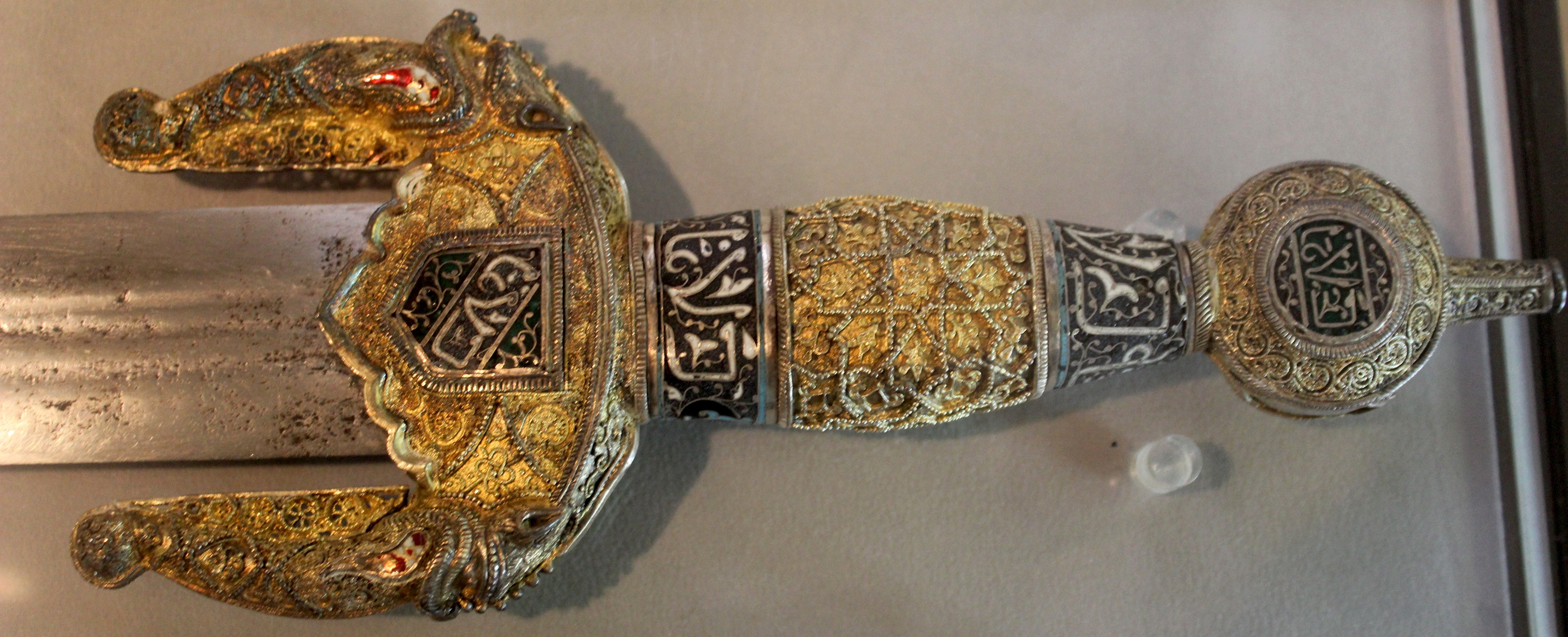
A jineta-type Nasrid sword from the 15th century

Muhammad V died in 1391, bringing an end to the Nasrid dynasty's golden years. Until its fall in the late 15th century, the dynasty became embroiled in succession disputes, rivalries, and assassinations. Internal conflicts often revolved around the Banu Sarraj family (known in Spanish sources as the Abencerrajes) and their rivals, who ruthlessly pursued their own interests at the expense of the emirate's stability. Externally, the emirate remained at peace during some periods thanks mainly to the fact that Castile continued to struggle with its own internal problems as well.

War with Castile did break out between 1405 and 1410, followed by a period of peace until 1428. External wars and internal disputes continued through the 1430s and 1440s. During the early reign of Henry IV (r. 1454–1474), Castile resumed a more ambitious crusading military policy against Granada. The emirate's position was exacerbated by violent internal confrontations with the Banu Sarraj. This political chaos contributed to the final capture of Gibraltar by Castile in 1462.

==== Fall of Granada ====
In the mid-15th century, Castile was preoccupied with several civil conflicts and disputes over succession. Henry IV had only one child, Isabella, who in 1468 married Ferdinand, the son of John II of Aragon. By 1479, both Henry IV and John II had died, leaving Isabella and Ferdinand as rulers of a united Castile and Aragon. This was a pivotal turning point, as Granada could no longer play the two kingdoms against each other to ensure its own survival. The new royal couple, known as the Catholic Monarchs, were also united in their intention to conquer the emirate.

The war against Granada offered an opportunity for Ferdinand and Isabella to harness the restless Castilian nobility against a common enemy and instill subjects with a sense of loyalty to the crown. Granada's successful capture of the Castilian frontier town of Zahara in December 1481 marked the last time it was able to gain ground against Castile.

The Granada War began in 1482, with Christian forces capturing Alhama de Granada in February. This was a major Christian victory, as Alhama was located in the heart of the emirate, on the road between Granada and the emirate's second city, Malaga. This marked the beginning of a grinding 10-year war. The Christian force was made up of troops provided by Castilian nobles, towns, and the Santa Hermandad, as well as Swiss mercenaries. The Catholic Church also encouraged other Christian countries to offer their troops and their finances to the war effort.

Meanwhile, civil war erupted in Granada as a result of succession struggles in the Nasrid ruling house, which undermined any focused resistance to the Spanish advance. In July 1482, Muhammad XI, known as Boabdil to the Christians, led a successful coup against his father, Abu'l Hasan. Abu'l Hasan, a capable military leader, was forced to flee to Malaga and the emirate was divided between him and his son. Boabdil was subsequently captured by the Castilians in 1483 and was only released after making major concessions that undermined his credibility in Granada. He agreed to resettle in Guadix while his father resumed control of Granada. Abu'l Hasan died in 1485, shortly after abdicating to his brother, Muhammad ibn Sa'd (Muhammad XII), known as al-Zaghal.

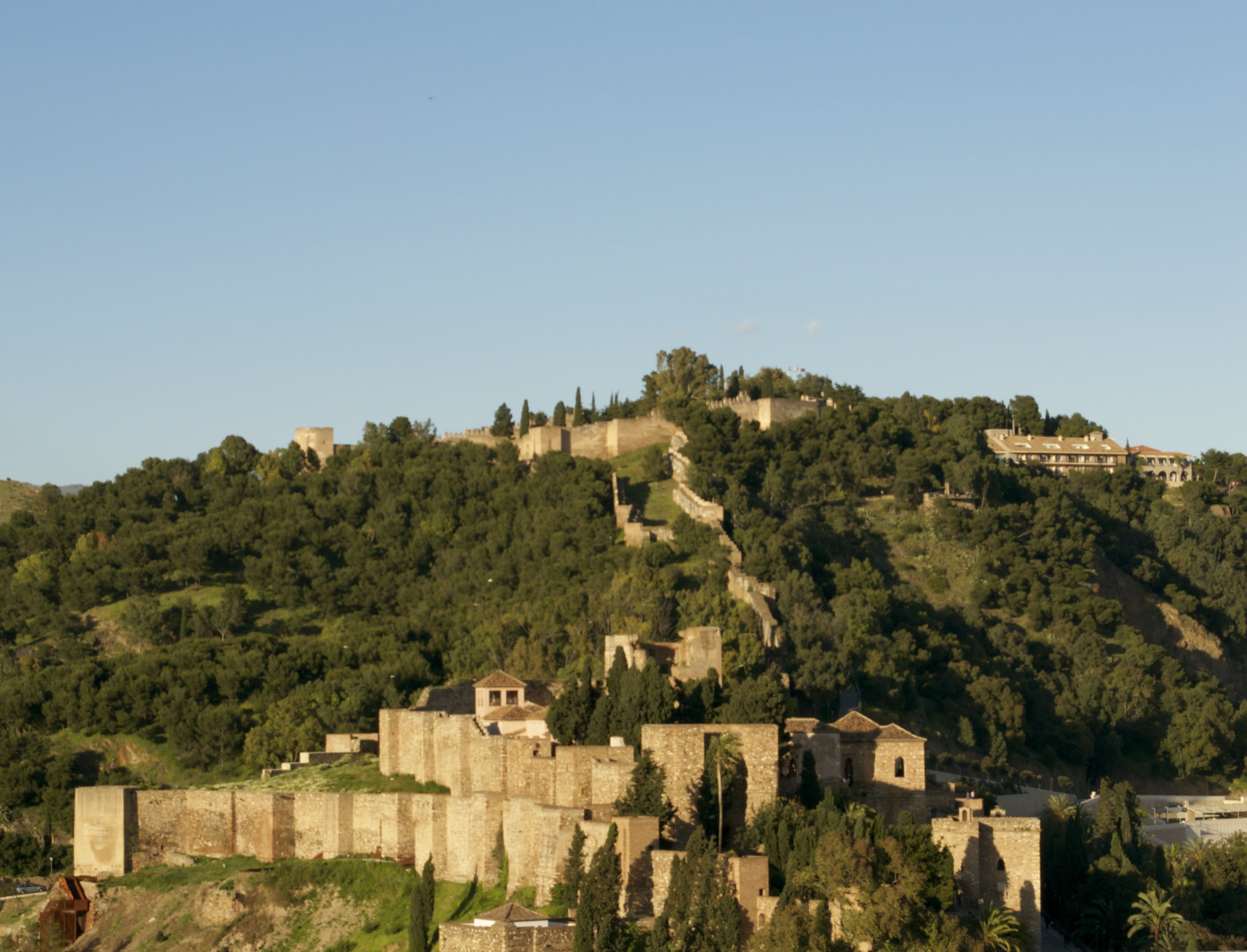
The Alcazaba and the Castle of Gibralfaro, part of the elaborate fortifications that protected Malaga in the Nasrid period

After this, the Spanish campaigns continued unabated and made slow but steady progress, while internal strife continued among the Nasrids. Boabdil returned to Granada in 1487, this time with Castilian support, and managed to force al-Zaghal to flee. Once in control, he made initial offers to surrender Granada to Ferdinand and Isabella and he even cooperated at times with the Spanish forces. Meanwhile, al-Zaghal continued to lead a fierce resistance against the Spanish from outside Granada, forcing the Catholic Monarchs to deal with him first. The Siege of Málaga took place from May to August 1487 and was one of the most difficult and prolonged engagements of the war. The strongly fortified city put up a vigorous resistance, led by one of al-Zaghal's commanders, while Boabdil continued to stand back or actively help the Catholic Monarchs. Because the city resisted, its inhabitants were given little mercy and either killed or enslaved, which encouraged other Muslim towns to surrender more quickly after this. Al-Zaghal held out a while longer in Almería, but any hope of successful resistance ended after the Spanish capture of Baeza in November 1489. He negotiated the surrender of Almería and Guadix and agreed to retire himself to the Alpujarras region, but soon afterwards he abandoned al-Andalus completely. In 1489–90, he sold all his lands and moved to Oran (present-day Algeria) in North Africa.

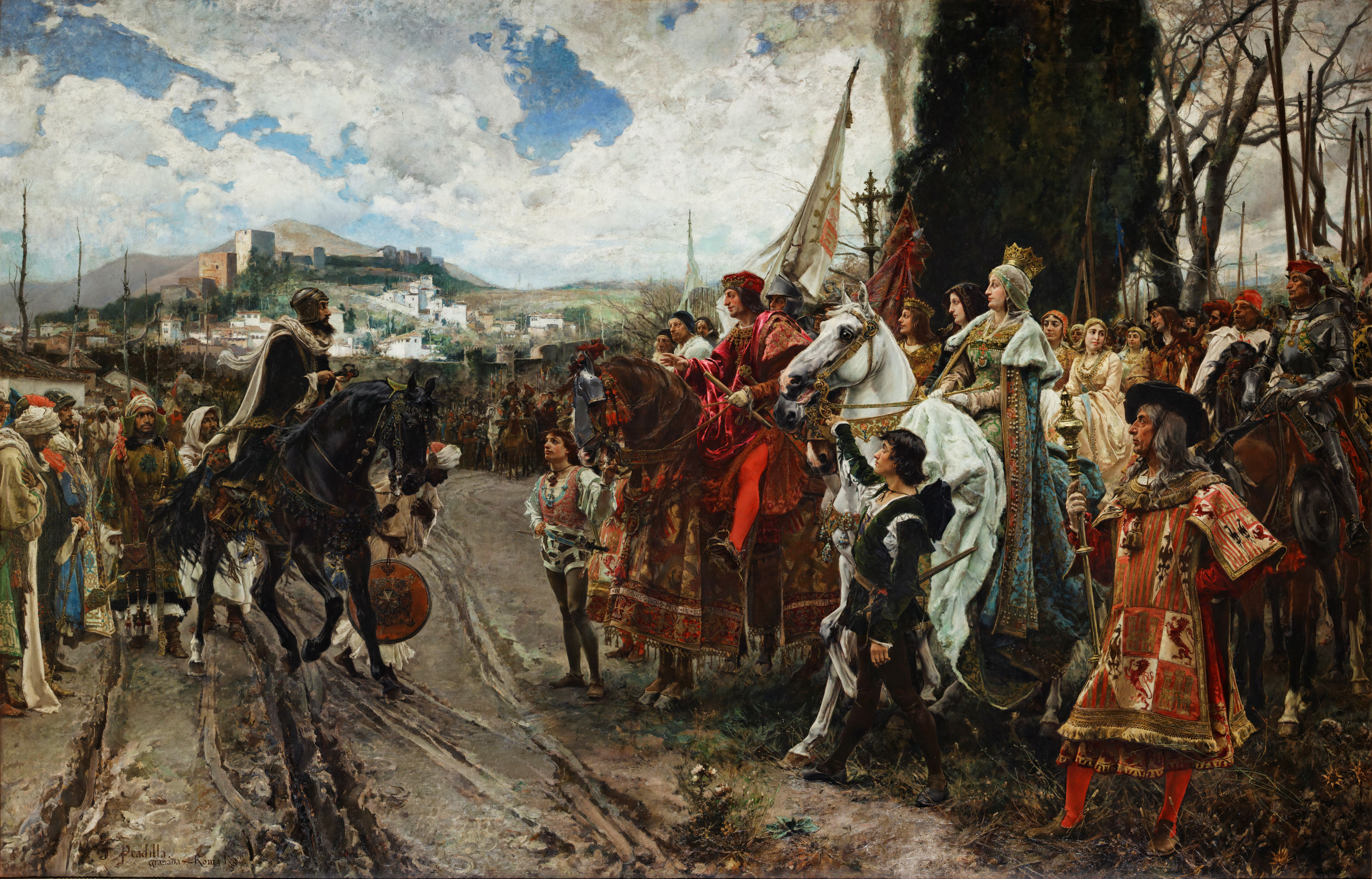
The Surrender of Granada, a 19th-century depiction by Spanish painter Francisco Pradilla Ortiz

Only Granada remained under Muslim control by 1490. Boabdil and the remaining Nasrid elites negotiated with Ferdinand and Isabella, though little progress was made either way during that year. By 1491, the city itself lay under siege. On 25 November 1491, the Treaty of Granada was signed, setting out the conditions for surrender. On 2 January 1492, Boabdil surrendered Granada to Ferdinand and Isabella.

=== Aftermath ===
Although some remained, the Castilians encouraged the Nasrid aristocracy to leave for North Africa, as it would likely frustrate any attempts by the Muslim population to reorganize themselves politically. After the surrender of Granada, Boabdil remained for a little over a year in a country estate in the mountainous Alpujarras, as lord of Mondújar, before leaving for Fez in North Africa. According to al-Maqqari (d. 1632), he died in 1518 or in 1533 and was buried in Fez. Another account, by 16th-century writer Luis del Mármol Carvajal, claims that Boabdil died instead in battle in 1536. Al-Maqqari also reports that in his time (c. 1617), Boabdil's descendants were living in poverty in Fez.

About 200,000 Muslims are thought to have emigrated to North Africa after the fall of Granada. It is known that many Muslims emigrated to Morocco after the departure of their emir, and some of them successively emigrated to Egypt and the Levant. For Jews as well, a period of tolerance under Muslim rule in the Iberian Peninsula came to an end with their expulsion by the Christian monarchy in 1492. The Christian conquest of Granada did not extinguish the spirit of the Reconquista. Isabella urged Christians to pursue a conquest of North Africa.

Initially, under the conditions of surrender, the Muslims who remained were guaranteed their property, laws, customs, and religion. This however, did not ensue, causing the Muslims to rebel against their Christian rulers, culminating with an uprising in 1500. The rebellion was seen as a chance to formally end the Treaty of Granada, withdrawing the rights of Muslims. Muslims in the area were given the choice of expulsion or conversion. Those who remained and officially converted were thereafter known as Moriscos.

Philip II of Spain (r. 1556–1598) issued multiple decrees against the Morisco population, including the decree issued in 1563, which prohibited them from carrying arms, and the decree issued in 1566, which prohibited the use of the Arabic language. Philip believed that the most effective way to solve the problem of the Moriscos lay in confiscating their properties and lands and completely erasing their identity, thus ending their existence as a distinct community. He issued a decree in the year 1567 forbidding them to wear their traditional embroidered clothes, mandating the use of Christian hats and pants, and further prohibited their language, customs and celebrations. When the Muslims tried to start a dialogue to mitigate its effects, the authorities insisted on implementing its content. In 1568, a new rebellion broke out, which lasted three years and spread to most of the areas where there was a Muslim presence. The Spanish authorities eventually succeeded in repressing it.

==== Ottoman and Moroccan projects to recover al-Andalus ====
As a result of the repression of the Moriscos, some of them requested help from the Muslim sultans and princes, headed by the Ottoman sultan Bayezid II (r. 1481–1512). One of the documents that a Christianized Andalusi wrote to the sultan requested his help and described in poor poetry the abuse of the courts of the Inquisition, calling on him to support his defeated brothers. But Bayezid was preoccupied with the disputes of the Ottoman family, so he was content to send a note of protest to the two Catholic monarchs, on which they did not act.

During the 16th century, the Ottoman Empire reached the height of its power and prestige, recognized as a major power by the Holy Roman Empire and the Christian kingdoms of Western Europe. With this position of strength, Sultan Suleiman the Magnificent (r. 1520–1566) turned his attention to the Iberian Peninsula. This coincided with the rise of Khayr al-Din Barbarossa in Algiers and the establishment of Ottoman authority over Algeria. After preparing the necessary bases for their fleets at Ifriqiya (roughly present-day Tunisia), the plan was to attack Spain itself in order to recapture Andalusia. Both Spain and Portugal were considered the main threat to the Islamic world due to the presence of their fleets in the Indian Ocean that threatened Muslim trade in the East. This attack would thus also serve to force both naval powers to fall back in order to defend themselves.

Khair al-Din Barbarossa had previously begun attacking Spanish and European ships in general in retaliation for the treatment of Muslims in Andalusia. He also sent his ships to transport Muslims and Jews fleeing the Inquisition and Christianization attempts. However, Suleiman the Magnificent died in 1566 without implementing the plan against Spain. His son and successor, Selim II (r. 1566–1574), rejected all his father's options and decided to conquer the island of Cyprus instead, believing that the Venetians should be removed from that island before he could consider the recovery of Andalusia. After the Ottomans became preoccupied on several eastern fronts and were defeated in the west at the naval Battle of Lepanto in 1571, the offensive nature of the Ottoman strategy in the Mediterranean came to an end, and with it the idea of attacking Spain and recapturing Andalusia.

The other major Muslim power in the region was the Saadi Sultanate in Morocco. In 1603, the Saadi sultan Ahmad al-Mansur died and a civil war broke out between his three sons. One of them, Muhammad al-Sheikh al-Ma'mun, sought the help of Philip III to eliminate his two brothers and ascend to the throne. On the other hand, the Moriscos in Valencia and eastern Andalusia supported his brother Zidan al-Nasir, on the condition that he invaded Spain. The Spanish king took that as a motive to remove the Moriscos. The Council of State discussed this matter and presented a report recommending that the Moriscos should be expelled for religious and political reasons. The most important reason stated was the threat of invasion by the Ottomans or the Moroccans, who might try to use Granada as a toehold from which to attack the rest of the peninsula. In 1609, a decree was issued mandating the expulsion of all Moriscos, finally removing any threat they might pose.

== Society ==
=== General ===
Whereas in earlier centuries, particularly under the rule of Umayyad Cordoba, the population of al-Andalus had been a relatively pluralistic mix of Muslims, Christians, and Jews of different ethnic backgrounds, the Emirate of Granada that formed in the 13th century was much more homogenously Muslim. Arabic was by far the dominant language and Romance languages were no longer in significant usage.

The kingdom was densely populated; its population increased in part thanks to the arrival of large numbers of Muslim refugees from the territories newly conquered by the Christian kingdoms to the north. This influx of refugees from the Christian north continued intermittently up to the 15th century. Estimates of the population are only tentative, but the population of the entire emirate may have been around 300,000 and the population of Granada itself around 50,000. Around 1314, Aragonese envoys at the Council of Vienne claimed that the emirate had a population of 200,000, but the basis for this estimate is unknown.

=== Muslims ===
The Muslim population of al-Andalus had diverse origins, including Iberians (known as Muladíes in Spanish or Muwallad in Arabic), North African Berbers, and a smaller component of Arab origin. By the 13th century, however, the established population had largely assimilated to Arab culture and to a common "Andalusi" identity. Ibn al-Khatib, in his writings, emphasised the "Arabness" of the Granadan population particularly in genealogical terms, claiming they were of pure Arab descent while sidelining the presence of non-Arab lineages. He believed that the people of Granada were a distinct people (qawm) united by language, culture, religion, and lineage, which he opposed to the non-Arabs (ajam), meaning the Iberian Christians. The fortress mentality of Granada's Muslims, however, made it difficult for the many Muslims who continued to live under Christian rule in Castile and Aragon – referred to as Mudéjars in Spanish and by modern historians – to maintain strong cultural links with the Arabic culture of Granada. As a result, the Muslims under Christian rule became culturally distinct from those living under Nasrid rule during this period.

While the Berber substratum of the traditional Andalusi population had largely been assimilated by the 13th century, new groups began to arrive from North Africa in the late 13th century that retained a more distinct identity. Most important among these were Zanata families from the Banu Marin (Marinid) tribe, which included those who were recruited to serve the Nasrid army. Most of them immigrated between 1275 and 1350. Given their military role, the Nasrids settled them intentionally in strategic cities such as Algeciras, Gibraltar, Ronda, and Málaga. Some non-Zanata Berber groups are also attested, particularly the Ghumara, after whom the Gomeres district in present-day Granada (on the south slope of the Alhambra hill) is named.

=== Jews ===
The only non-Muslim population of any significance within the emirate were Jews, who were generally concentrated in certain cities. Among them were long-established families who had lived here for generations as well as recent arrivals from the Christian north. Of the latter, some had fled during the Christian advance in the 13th century, fearing the political change, while others fled later during persecutions under Christian rule, particularly after the pogroms of 1391. The largest community was in Granada, although it is not clearly known in what part of the city they lived. There were other communities throughout the emirate, notably in Guadix and in Málaga. The Jewish population within the emirate has been estimated at around 3000. In 1492, 110 Jewish households were counted in Granada. Jews were prominent in professions such as merchants, interpreters or translators, and as doctors/physicians.

Jews were granted a protected status (dhimmi) that gave them legal rights to their religion and a certain legal autonomy for their community. The community had a leader, known as the Nagīd, who collected taxes and acted as its representative to the Nasrid rulers. Historical sources report that Jews were required to wear an external sign or mark (shārāt) in public that identified them as Jewish. Ibn al-Khatib reports that this rule was introduced during the reign of Isma'il I (r. 1314–1325). Al-Maqqari (d. 1632), citing an earlier source, reports that they were required to wear a yellow cap and a type of sash in the 13th century. More regulations and restrictions appear to have been added over time, though it's likely that they were not consistently enforced in some cases. Muhammad V seems to have been particularly welcoming towards Jews: 300 families returned with him to Granada when he raided Jaén in 1367, while towards the end of his reign many others arrived after the persecutions of 1391 in the Christian north.

=== Christians ===
The native Mozarabic Christian population of al-Andalus had largely disappeared prior to the Nasrid period due to pressures of assimilation, persecution, and expulsion under Almoravid and Almohad rule. Many had fled north to the Christian kingdoms or were expelled to North Africa where they could not cause trouble. The Christian population within the Nasrid emirate was thus very small and largely transitory, consisting of visitors, merchants, political exiles, and prisoners of war. They did not have the protected status of dhimmi that Jews and the former Mozarabic Christians had, but were instead granted safe conduct (aman) through special and often temporary agreements with varying conditions. Merchants were the most important group, hailing from other parts of the Iberian Peninsula but also, especially, from Italian trading cities such as Genoa. They resided in major cities that gave them access to both the coast and the kingdom's interior, such as Málaga, Granada, and Almería.

Christian prisoners were another major group and their conditions varied depending on their social background: captured nobles and royalty were treated with respect and given comfortable houses to live in, while captured commoners were confined to prisons in the large cities, including the dungeons in the Alhambra. Some of these captives were freed after converting to Islam, often joining the Nasrid army or the sultan's personal guard. Some of them even achieved high positions in the Nasrid court. The mothers of both Yusuf I and Muhammad V had been captured Christian women.

== Economy ==
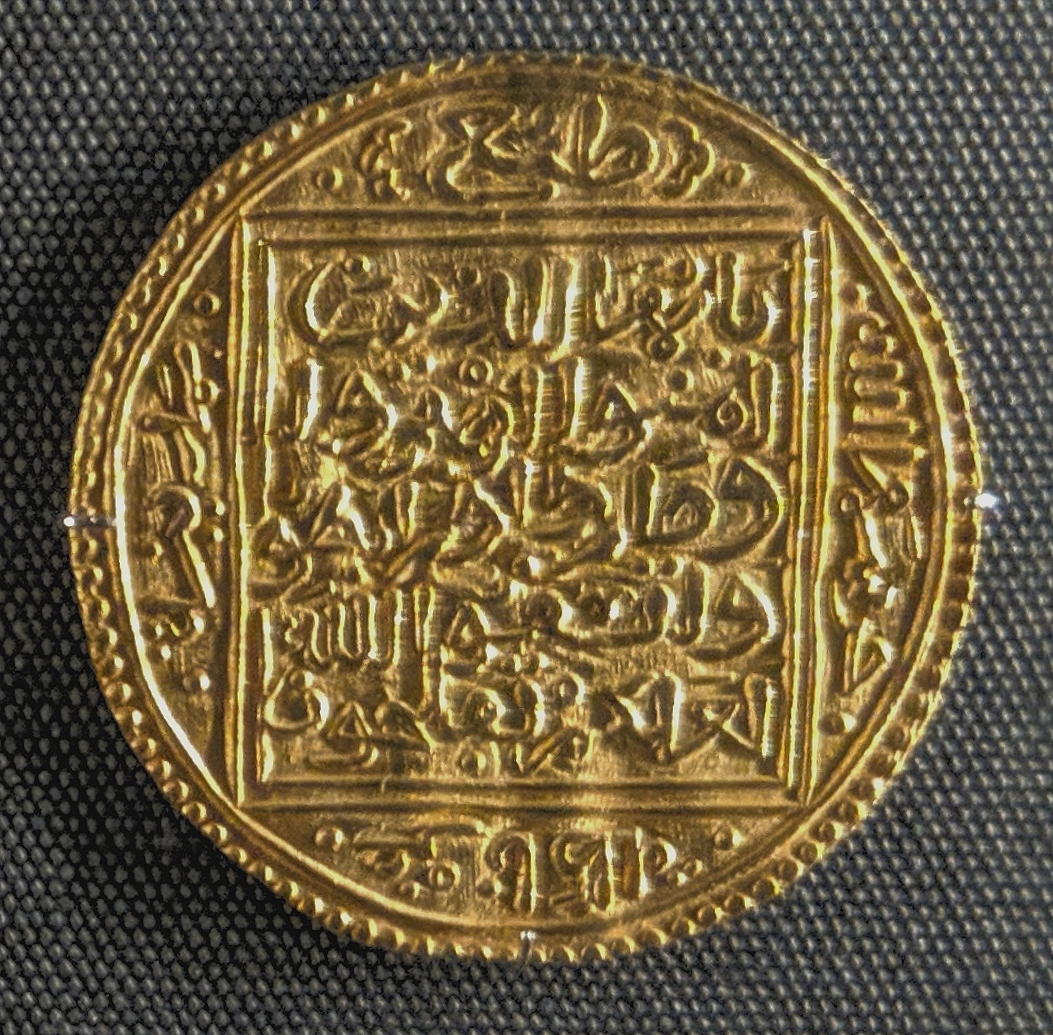
Gold coin minted by Muhammad V

The emirate's economy was mostly agricultural. The rural population of the countryside was organized primarily into traditional alquerías (small farming communities), which were usually occupied by free peasants who owned the land and cultivated it mostly for subsistence. Larger farming estates, which could be owned by Nasrid family members or other members of the ruling class, were typically found on the edge of urban centers. Cultivation was intensive, diversified, and usually required sophisticated irrigation strategies, which in turn required well-organized management at a collective or community level, reflecting already-established traditions in al-Andalus. Dry farming was also known and was more common in the emirate's frontier areas, where animal husbandry was also a common activity. In some coastal areas, agriculture was specialized in a different manner to allow for commercial export, encouraged by the presence of nearby port cities and their merchants.

As the Strait of Gibraltar became more open to commercial ships towards the end of the 13th century, maritime navigation around the Iberian Peninsula became cheaper and faster, accelerating the development of trade networks between the Mediterranean (particularly Italy and the regions of Catalonia and Provence) and northern Europe. Granada benefited from its location near the Strait.

Partly due to the heavy tributary payments to Castile, Granada's economy specialized in the trade of high-value goods. Integrated within the European mercantile network, the ports of the kingdom fostered intense trading relations with the Genoese, but also with the Catalans, and to a lesser extent, with the Venetians, the Florentines, and the Portuguese. Despite its small size, the emirate's superior agricultural technology and favorable climate allowed it to produce and export goods to the rest of Europe that had formerly been accessible only in the eastern Mediterranean, particularly sugar, silk, and dried fruits. Manufactured goods like luxury ceramics were another important export. Granada and its ports were also useful commercial centers from which European merchants could gain access to North African markets.

Italian and other European merchants were quick to exploit these opportunities and established relations with the emirate. Granada's economy was heavily financed by Genoese bankers who also aimed to gain control of the gold trade carried in through the trans-Saharan trade routes. However, after Portugal opened direct trade routes to sub-Saharan Africa by sea in the 15th century, Granada became less important as a regional commercial center.

== Culture ==
Despite its frontier position, Granada was also an important Islamic intellectual and cultural center, especially in the time of Muhammad V, with figures such as Ibn Khaldun and Ibn al-Khatib serving in the Nasrid court. Ibn Battuta, a famous traveller and historian, visited the Emirate of Granada in 1350. In his journal, he called Granada the "metropolis of Andalusia and the bride of its cities". The Nasrid sultans and members of the court were active patrons of literature, the arts, or sciences, and in many cases they were writers or scholars themselves.

=== Literature ===
The most highly valued form of literature among Granada's elites was poetry, which was collected in anthologies and even used as architectural decoration in the Alhambra palaces. Other important forms included mirrors for princes-type works, historical chronicles (akhbār or tā'rīkh), works on Sufism, travel chronicles (riḥla), and works of rhyming prose that narrated stories or anecdotes (maqāmāt). Many of these genres overlapped with each other; for example, historiography could be written in rhymed prose or could include poems.

Abu al-Tayyib al-Rundi (d. 1285–86), whom some contemporaries considered the last great writer of al-Andalus, served under Muhammad I and Muhammad II. He wrote both poetry and prose, including educational treatises intended for the sultan or his family. Ibn al-Khatib was a polymath and poet of the Nasrid court in the 14th century. He authored many works in various fields, and his poetry is carved into the walls of the Alhambra palace. Ibn Zamrak, his successor as vizier, was also one of the major poets of the emirate's history. His poems are likewise found carved in many parts of the Alhambra, including the Court of the Lions.

=== Architecture ===
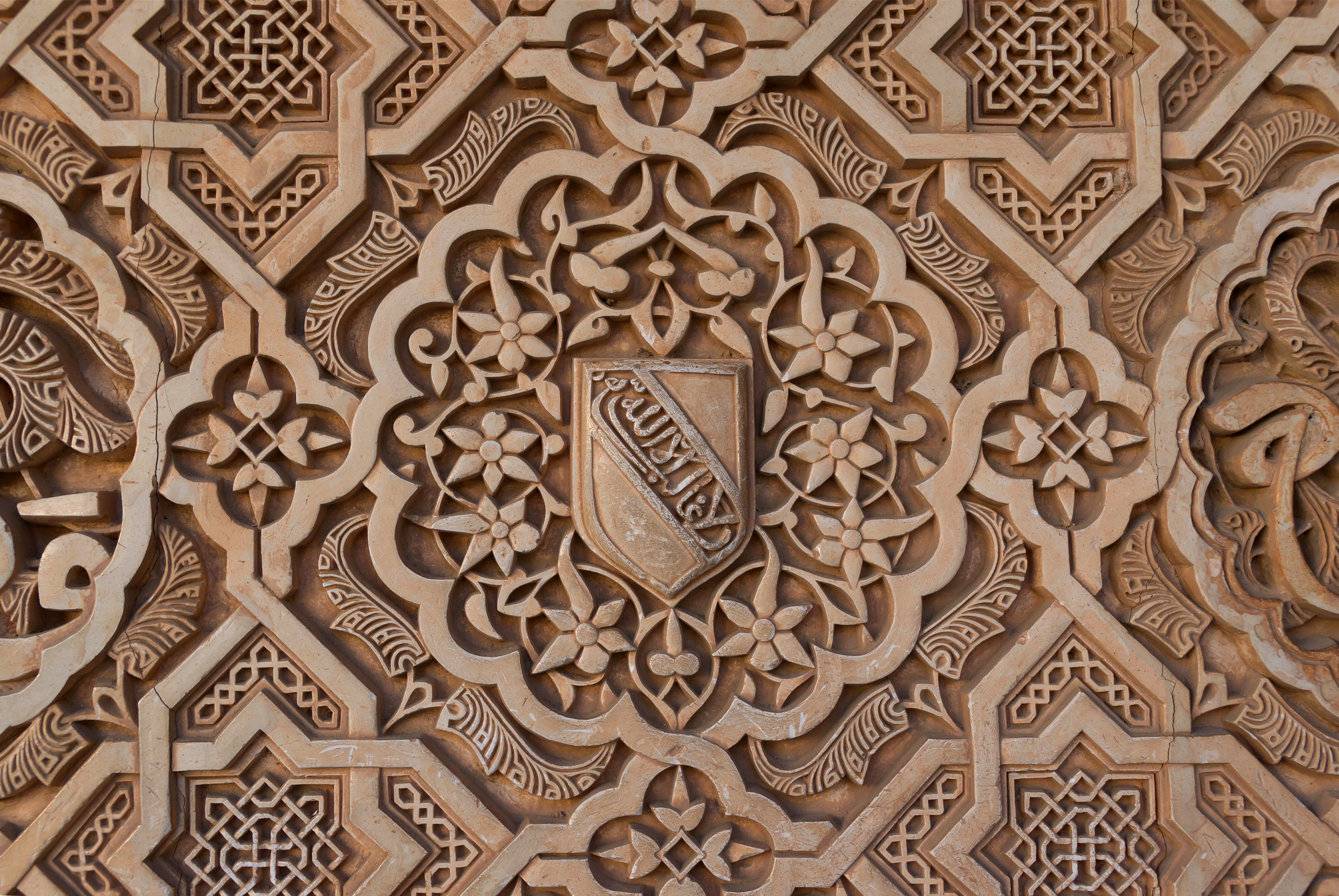
Detail of the coat of arms of the Emirate of Granada carved into the walls of the Alhambra palace.

The architecture of Nasrid Granada embraced extensive surface decoration in wood, stucco, and zillij tiling, as well as making use of elaborate muqarnas sculpting in many buildings. The Nasrids' most famous architectural legacy is the Alhambra, a hilltop palace district protected by heavy fortifications and containing some of the most famous and best-preserved palaces of western Islamic architecture, including what is known today as the Comares Palace and the Court of the Lions. The palace complex was developed throughout the period but some of the most important contributions were generally made during the rule of Yusuf I and Muhammad V during the 14th century.

The summer palace and gardens known as the Generalife were also created nearby. This reflected a tradition of royal countryside estates dating back to the Almoravids and continued under their successors – as exemplified by the older Agdal Gardens of Marrakesh and Buhayra Gardens of Seville, both from the Almohad era.

Other notable buildings and structures from this era are the Madrasa al-Yusufiyya (now known as the Palacio de la Madraza), the Funduq al-Jadida (now known as the Corral del Carbón), parts of Granada's city walls, the Alcázar Genil, and the Cuarto Real de Santo Domingo in Granada, in addition to various other fortifications and smaller monuments across the former emirate's territory.

=== Music ===
Gharnati music (الطرب الغرناطي) is a variety of Andalusi music that originated in Granada and moved to North Africa where it survived to this day.

=== Science ===
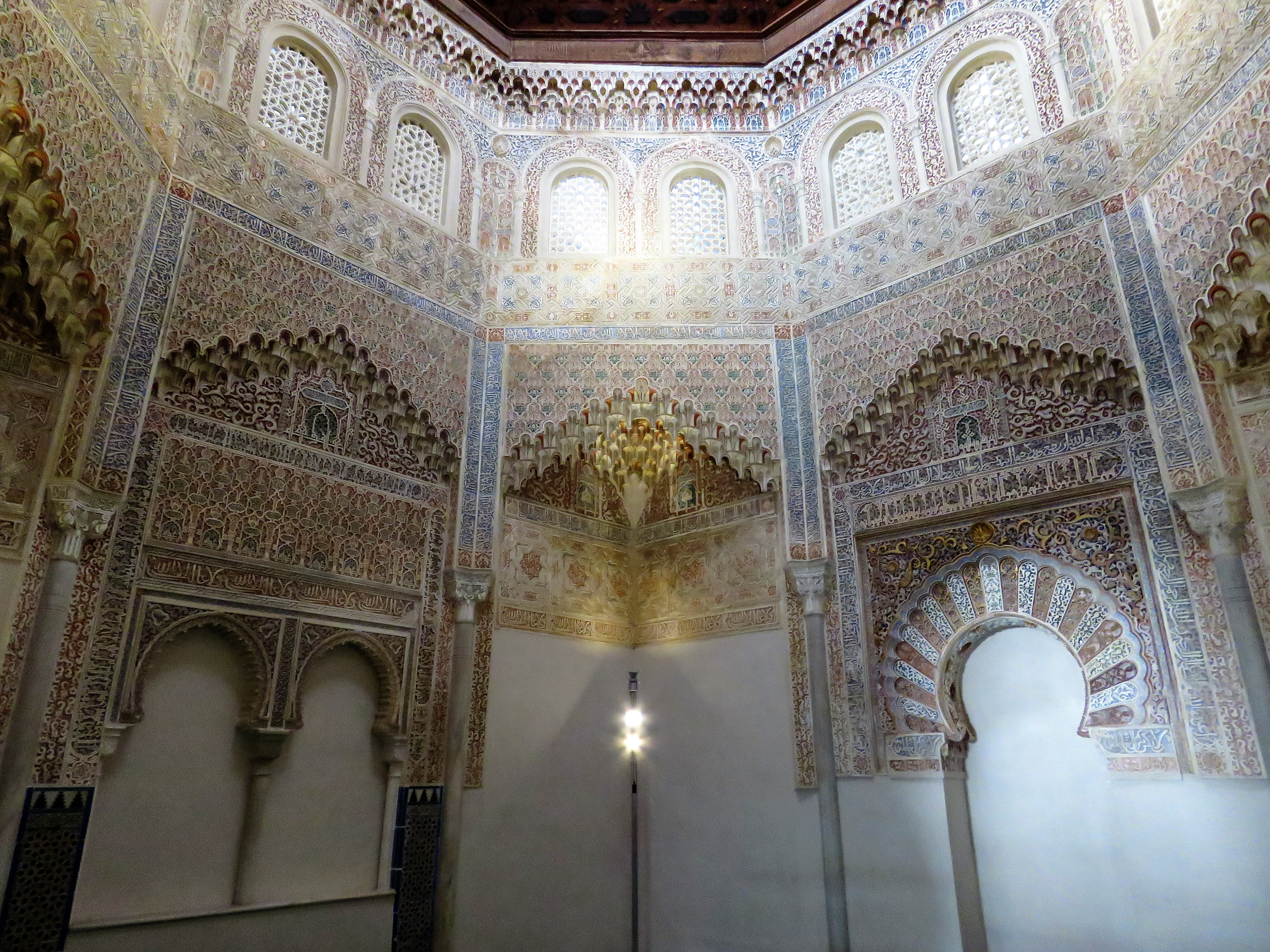
Remains of the prayer hall of the Madrasa al-Yusufiyya, a madrasa (college) built by Yusuf I in Granada

Due to the migrations (both forced or voluntary) of people across the region, Granada was able to attract scholars of various sciences. Mathematics, astronomy, agronomy, and botany were among the subjects studied by some individuals, but the most prominent scientific field in Granada was medicine.

Muḥammad ibn Aḥmad al-Riquṭi al-Mursi, a scholar from Murcia, was invited to Granada by Muhammad II after Murcia was conquered by Alfonso X in the 1260s. He was installed in the countryside outside the city, where he founded a school that taught mainly medicine and, to a lesser extent, other disciplines. It did so independently from the teaching that occurred in mosques. Although the school did not last throughout the Nasrid period, it was an important instrument in training other disciples and helped to attract other intellectuals to the emirate.

In 1349, Yusuf I founded Granada's first madrasa, a type of institution that was already present in North Africa and the rest of the Muslim world. The Madrasa al-Yusufiyya, named after him, taught traditional disciplines such as Islamic law and Arabic grammar, but it also taught medicine, like al-Riquti's school. It attained significant prestige and attracted students from both al-Andalus and North Africa.

== Military ==
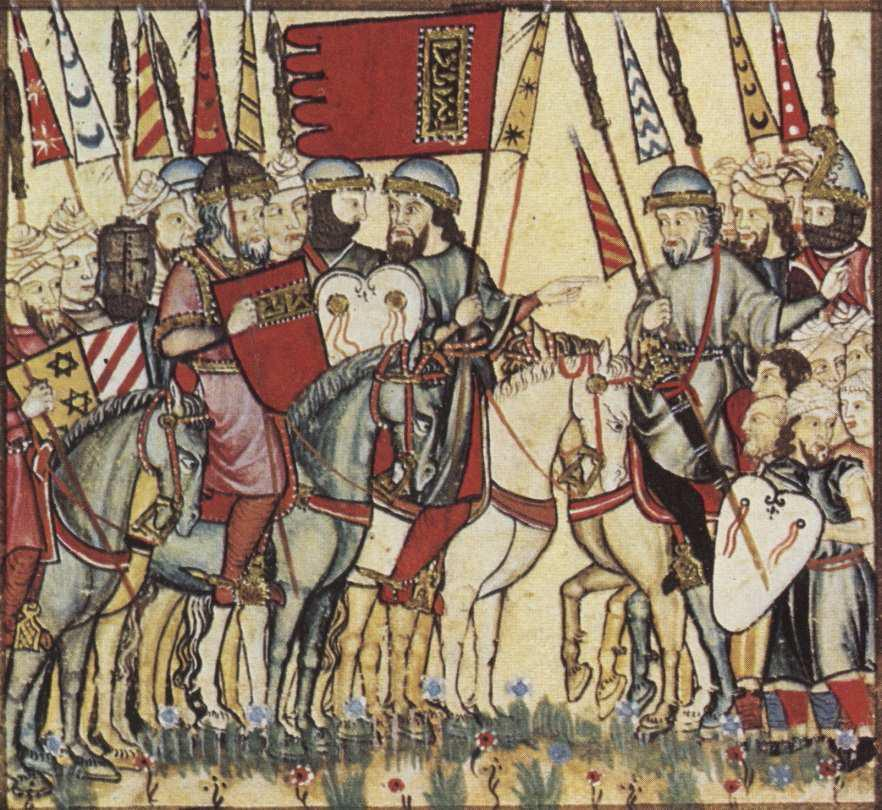
Muhammad I of Granada leading his troops during the Mudéjar revolt of 1264–1266, illustrated in the contemporary Cantigas de Santa Maria.

Constantly under threat by both the Christian kingdoms to the north and the Muslim Marinid Sultanate to the south, the population of the Emirate of Granada developed a "siege mentality". The country consequently maintained a strong military. Its border territories were dotted with castles maintained by frontier warriors (thagri) led by armoured elite warriors who were influenced by and comparable to the Christian knights. However, the core of the emirate's army consisted of highly mobile light cavalry as well as light infantry.

The Granadan army was ethnically and culturally mixed. A large part were recruited locally through the jund system in which families with military obligations were registered and conscripted for service. In addition, the Granadan rulers encouraged North African warriors to migrate to the country and serve as ghazi. These immigrants were mostly Zenata (or Zanata) Berbers and eventually organized as Volunteers of the Faith, a factually autonomous and very powerful unit within the Granadan military. The Zenata served as light cavalry, which gave rise to the Spanish term jinete (derived from the name 'Zenata'), which denoted this type of light cavalry. They formed the backbone of the Granadan army, serving both in crucial battles as well as in regular raids inside Christian territory. They were highly mobile on the field, armed with lances, javelins, and small round shields known for their flexibility, and used their own characteristic set of tactics. They sometimes also served as auxiliaries in Castilian armies, sent by the Nasrid emirs of Granada to aid their allies. They were recruited and led by exiled members of the Marinid family and settled within the kingdom of Granada. Their Marinid commander was known as the shaykh al-ghuzāt ('chief of the ghazis'), but in 1374 Muhammad V suppressed this office due to their political interference, after which they were commanded by a Nasrid or Andalusi general.

Muhammad V reduced the status of the Volunteers and reformed the military, strengthening instead the Andalusian components of the Granadan military. The smallest part of the regular Granadan military were Christians and ex-Christians who had been hired by the emirs or defected to them. These were often Spanish knights and termed Mamluks; these warriors were organized as elite bodyguards by some emirs. To augment their army, the Granadans also hired foreign mercenaries.

In regard to its organization, the Granadan military was formally headed by the emir and divided into several units. The frontier areas were possibly commanded by rais, while each important frontier garrison was led by a shaykh khassa. The army was divided into major divisions, each led by a wali, under whom military emirs served as leaders for 5,000 troops, followed by qaid leading 1,000, naqib leading 200, and finally nazir leading eight. The Volunteers of the Faith were initially commanded by the shaykh al-ghuzat. In addition, there existed a Gendarmerie-like shurta in Granada city, commanded by the sahib al-shurta. The Granadan army was usually accompanied by a corps of guides (dalil), religious figures who tended to morale, armourers, medics, and some poets as well as orators.

== List of the sultans of Granada ==
The following is a list of Nasrid rulers, alongside the years that they reigned. Some years overlap due to competition for the throne between two or more Nasrid claimants.

Reign	Ruler	Notes
1232–1273	Muhammad I	Also known as Ibn al-Ahmar.
1273–1302	Muhammad II	
1302–1309	Muhammad III	
1309–1314	Nasr	
1314–1325	Ismail I	
1325–1333	Muhammad IV	
1333–1354	Yusuf I	
1354–1359	Muhammad V	First reign.
1359–1360	Ismail II	
1360–1362	Muhammad VI	
1362–1391	Muhammad V	Second reign.
1391–1392	Yusuf II	
1392–1408	Muhammad VII	
1408–1417	Yusuf III	
1417–1419	Muhammad VIII	First reign.
1419–1427	Muhammad IX	First reign.
1427–1429	Muhammad VIII	Second reign.
1429–1432	Muhammad IX	Second reign.
1432	Yusuf IV	
1432–1445	Muhammad IX	Third reign.
1445–1446	Yusuf V	First reign.
1447–1448	Ismail III	
1447–1453	Muhammad IX	Fourth reign.
1453–1454	Muhammad X	
1454–1455	Sa'd	
1462–1463	Ismail IV	
1462	Yusuf V	Second reign.
1464–1482	Abu'l Hasan	First reign. Known as Muley Hácen in Christian sources.
1482–1483	Muhammad XI	First reign. Known as Boabdil in Christian sources.
1483–1485	Abu'l Hasan	Second reign.
1485–1489	Muhammad XII	Also known as al-Zaghal.
1486–1492	Muhammad XI	Second reign.

== See also ==
- Nasrid–Ottoman relations
- Border of Granada
- Romance of Abenamar
- List of Sunni Muslim dynasties
