= Abu Nasr Sa'd of Granada =

Abu Nasr Sa'd

Sultan of Granada (1st reign)
- Reign: 1454–1455
- Predecessor: Muhammad X of Granada
- Successor: Muhammad X of Granada

Sultan of Granada (2nd reign)
- Reign: 1455–1462
- Predecessor: Muhammad X of Granada
- Successor: Ismail IV of Granada

Sultan of Granada (3rd reign)
- Reign: 1463–1464
- Predecessor: Ismail IV of Granada
- Successor: Abu'l-Hasan Ali of Granada
- Born: 1398
- Died: 23 August 1465 (aged 66–67)
- Dynasty: Nasrides
- Father: Ali ibn Yusuf
- Religion: Islam

Abu Nasr Sa'd (Note: Arabic: أبو نصر سعد بن علي بن يوسف, romanized: ʾAbū Naṣr Saʿd ibn ʿAlī ibn Yūsuf) (1398–1465) was the twentieth Nasrid ruler of the Emirate of Granada on the Iberian Peninsula. He was known by the regnal name al-Musta'in bi-llah (Note: Arabic: المستعين بالله, romanized: al-Mustaʿīn bi-ʾllāh, lit. 'he who looks for help to God') ("he who looks for help to God") and as Ciriza (a corruption of Sidi Sa'd) or Mulay Zad ("Lord Sa'd") to contemporary Christian chroniclers.

Sa'd reigned during a period of intense political instability marked by dynastic conflict and pressure from Castile. A grandson of Yusuf II and descendant of Muhammad V, he emerged as a leading contender for the throne after the death of Muhammad IX. Backed by factions within Granada and later by the Castilian king Enrique IV, Sa'd briefly seized power in 1454, though he was soon displaced by Muhammad X. With continued support, he regained the throne in 1455 and ruled for most of the following seven years.

His second reign was dominated by warfare with Castile, resulting in territorial losses and costly truces that required tribute payments, the release of captives, and the sale of royal lands. Economic decline and political tensions weakened his authority. His attempt to curb the powerful Abencerrajes family culminated in their violent suppression, further destabilizing the court.

In 1462 he was briefly overthrown by Ismail IV before regaining power. However, internal divisions persisted, and in 1464 his son Abu l-Hasan Ali deposed him. Sa'd spent his final year in Almeria, dying in 1465.

== Early life and family ==
Born in Granada in 1398, Sa'd belonged to the ruling Nasrid dynasty through his father, the prince 'Ali, a son of the emir Yusuf II. He was therefore the grandson of Yusuf II and the great-grandson of the celebrated Muhammad V. In addition, his uncles were Muhammad VII and Yusuf III. Christian sources often referred to him as "Ciriza", derived from the Arabic expression Sidi Sa'd ("my lord Sa'd").

Sa'd had several children, some of whom played prominent roles in the final decades of Nasrid rule. Among his sons were Abu l-Hasan Ali, later known in Christian sources as Muley Hacen, who eventually succeeded him as emir; Muhammad, later known as al-Zagal, who also ascended the throne; and Yusuf, who died young during a plague outbreak in 1467. Saʿd also had a daughter named A'isha.

Little is known of his early career but evidence suggests that the prince held positions of responsibility during the reign of his cousin Muhammad VIII. In a document dated 28 May 1428, Saʿd sent urgent orders to the chiefs of the Comares district to prepare defenses against an anticipated Christian attack.

== First reign (1454–1455) ==
The circumstances that brought Sa'd to the throne were closely tied to the turbulent and complex reign of Muhammad IX, who ruled intermittently between 1419 and 1453. Upon Muhammad IX’s death, the Nasrid vizier Abu l-Qasim al-Sarraj announced both the demise of the emir and the accession of Muhammad X al-Saghir. Although al-Saghir secured recognition from the Castilian crown, his authority within Granada itself was fragile. Many members of the Nasrid elite and a large part of the population favored Sa'd, the grandson of Yusuf II, as a more legitimate and capable candidate. Faced with mounting pressure from the pro-Sa'd faction, Muhammad X abdicated in his favor.

Sa'd ascended the throne in 1454 at the relatively advanced age of 55 and adopted the honorific title al-Musta'in bi-llah (“He who seeks God’s assistance”). His first reign, however, proved extremely brief. It represented little more than an interruption in the political ambitions of Muhammad X, who soon regained the throne only a few months later.

== Struggle with Muhammad X and Castilian Intervention ==
During his second attempt to rule, Muhammad X had to defend his authority against Saʿd, who continued to challenge him with significant support. Sa'd’s cause was strengthened by his son Abu l-Hasan 'Ali, the future Muley Hacen, and by the powerful Nasrid clan known as the Abencerrajes (Banu l-Sarraj). Sa'd also secured the backing of the Castilian king Enrique IV, who saw the Nasrid factional conflict as an opportunity to exert influence over the emirate.

Henry IV launched several military expeditions against Granada, attacking cities and devastating surrounding agricultural regions. These campaigns increased the pressure on the Nasrid leadership and forced the Granadans to negotiate a truce in July 1455. The Castilian intervention and internal opposition to Muhammad X ultimately facilitated Sa'd’s return to power. Only about a month after the truce had been concluded, Sa'd succeeded in recovering the throne.

== Second reign (1455–1462) ==
Sa'd’s second and longest reign lasted approximately seven years and was marked by persistent warfare, economic strain, and internal political tensions. During this period the emirate faced repeated Castilian attacks that resulted in the loss or devastation of several strategic locations. Among the territories affected were Estepona, Malaga, Fuengirola, and Jimena de la Frontera, which were either captured or severely damaged during Christian campaigns. In September 1458 a truce between Granada and Castile was enacted and renewed on several occasions in the following years. Peace at a heavy cost for Granada predominated until 1462, the year in which he was dethroned, predominated.

In order to secure this temporary peace, Sa'd was repeatedly compelled to negotiate truces with Castile. These agreements imposed heavy obligations on the Nasrid state. They included the payment of substantial tribute and the release of Christian captives held within the emirate. The financial burden of these concessions was considerable and contributed to the weakening of the Nasrid economy. To meet these demands, Sa'd sold properties belonging to the royal patrimony. Lands in fertile agricultural regions such as the Vega of Granada, valuable urban properties, and other assets traditionally associated with the crown were released in order to raise funds. The repeated need to satisfy Castilian demands thus undermined both the economic resources and the political prestige of the Nasrid monarchy.The currency was also devalued during Sa'd's reign; coins previously minted in gold were minted in silver or silver-plated copper.

During these years the Abencerrajes clan exercised increasing influence within the Nasrid court. Although they had initially supported Sa'd’s cause, their growing power eventually became a source of concern for the sultan. Determined to curb their influence, Sa'd orchestrated a violent purge against them in 1462. According to later accounts, he organized an ambush in the Alhambra that resulted in the execution of two of their principal leaders, Abu Surrur al-Mufarrij and the wazir, Yusuf ibn al-Sarraj.

This dramatic episode became one of the most famous legends associated with the Nasrid palace. Popular tradition later claimed that the reddish stains visible in the fountain of the Hall of the Abencerrajes in the Alhambra were the traces of blood shed during this massacre. Although the historical accuracy of this interpretation is doubtful, the story reflects the enduring memory of the event in Granada’s cultural tradition.

Other members of the clan managed to escape and took refuge in Málaga, from where they called upon other family members and supporters throughout al-Andalus to join them. Forces from Gibraltar responded to the call, leaving that important stronghold undefended. When Castile learned of this, the Duke of Medina Sidonia, Juan de Guzmán, and the Count of Arcos, Rodrigo Ponce de León, seized the opportunity to capture the stronghold in August 1462. A month later, the strategically important town of Archidona fell to Castilian forces on 30 September 1462. The loss of these fortresses highlighted the growing vulnerability of the Nasrid frontier and further damaged Sa'd’s reputation.

Despite his attempts to consolidate authority, Sa'd’s rule gradually lost support among the population. The repeated Castilian incursions and the heavy financial burdens imposed to secure peace eroded confidence in his leadership. Many inhabitants of Granada came to believe that the sultan was incapable of effectively defending the emirate. The discontent reached such levels that some residents of the city of Granada reportedly considered submitting voluntarily to Castile, preferring the status of Mudejars (Muslims living under Christian rule) to continued insecurity under the Nasrid government.

== Interregnum of Ismail IV (1462–1463) ==
Amid this atmosphere of dissatisfaction, a new rival emerged. With the support of Castile and the Abencerrajes, the Nasrid prince Ismail IV dominated the western part of the Andalusian territory and made a claim to the throne. Supported by factions within Granada and by elements hostile to Sa'd’s government, Ismail succeeded in seizing the throne in September 1462. Sa'd was forced to abandon the capital, though not for long: at the end of that same year, in the last days of 1462 or the first of 1463, Imail IV was expelled from the Alhambra and Sa'd regained the throne.

== Third reign and final overthrow (1463–1464) ==
Sa'd’s third reign began in a kingdom more divided than ever before. Externally he attempted to strengthen his position by seeking assistance from other Muslim powers. Diplomatic embassies were sent to the Mamluk Sultanate of Egypt and to the Hafsid rulers of Tunis, requesting aid in the struggle against the Christian kingdoms of Iberia. The Hafsids reportedly provided some support for the war effort, although these initiatives did little to alter the strategic balance with Castile.

Internally Sa'd faced an even greater challenge: the ambition of his own son Abu l-Hasan ʿAli. Known in Christian sources as Muley Hacen, Abu l-Hasan had already begun exercising many of the functions of government during the later years of his father’s reign. Supported by influential courtiers and factions within the Nasrid elite, he eventually moved against Saʿd. In 1464 Abu l-Hasan deposed his father and assumed effective control of the emirate.

After his deposition Sa'd withdrew from Granada and spent the last phase of his life in the eastern part of the emirate. Some accounts suggest that he was temporarily imprisoned in Salobrena or Moclin before eventually settling in Almeria. There he retained the nominal title of sultan but no longer exercised real authority. Sa'd died on 23 August 1465. Following his death his remains were taken to Granada and buried in the royal cemetery of the Nasrid dynasty located near the Alhambra.

== Sources ==
- Boloix Gallardo, Bárbara (2022). "Chapter 6 Granada, Capital of al-Andalus and Core of the Nasrid Kingdom (7th–9th/13th–15th Centuries)". A companion to Islamic Granada. Brill. ISBN 978-90-04-38211-4.
- Catlos, Brian A. (2018). Kingdoms of faith: a new history of Islamic Spain (first ed.). New York: Basic Books. ISBN 978-0-465-05587-6.
- Echevarría, Ana (2009). Knights on the Frontier: The Moorish guard of the Kings of Castile (1410-1467). Boston: Brill. ISBN 978-90-474-2441-3.
- Echevarria, Ana (2018). "Chapter 19. The "Honourable Ladies" of Nasrid Granada". In Woodacre, Elena (ed.). A companion to global queenship. Leeds: ARC Humanities Press. ISBN 978-1-942401-46-9.
- Gallardo, B. B. (2020). "Chapter 1 The Banū Naṣr: The Founders of the Nasrid Kingdom of Granada (Thirteenth–Fifteenth Centuries)". The Nasrid Kingdom of Granada between East and West. Brill.
- Harvey, L. P. (1990). Islamic Spain, 1250 to 1500. Chicago: University of Chicago Press. ISBN 978-0-226-31962-9.
- Latham, J.D. & Fernández-Puertas, A. (1993). "Naṣrids". In Bosworth, C. E.; van Donzel, E.; Heinrichs, W. P. & Pellat, Ch. (eds.). The Encyclopaedia of Islam, Second Edition. Volume VII: Mif–Naz. Leiden: E. J. Brill. pp. 1020–1029. doi:10.1163/1573-3912_islam_COM_0855. ISBN 978-90-04-09419-2.
- Mediano, F. (2010). "The post-Almohad dynasties in al-Andalus and the Maghrib (seventh–ninth/thirteenth–fifteenth centuries)". The New Cambridge History of Islam. Vol. 4. Cambridge University Press.
- O'Callaghan, Joseph F. (2014). The last crusade in the West: Castile and the conquest of Granada. Middle Ages series (1st ed.). Philadelphia: University of Pennsylvania Press. ISBN 978-0-8122-4587-5.
- Vidal Castro, Francisco. "Sa'd" (in Spanish).

Abu Nasr Sa'd of Granada Nasrid dynasty Died: 1465
Regnal titles
Preceded by Muhammad X	Sultan of Granada; 1454–1455	Succeeded by Muhammad X
Preceded by Muhammad X	Sultan of Granada; 1455–1462	Succeeded by Ismail IV
Preceded by Ismail IV	Sultan of Granada; 1464	Succeeded by Abu'l-Hasan Ali
