= Muhammad X of Granada =

Muhammad X

Sultan of Granada
- Reign: 1453–1454
- Predecessor: Muhammad IX of Granada
- Successor: Abu Nasr Sa'd of Granada
- Died: 1454
- Spouse: Aixa
- Dynasty: Nasrides
- Religion: Islam

Muhammad X of Granada (al-Saghir, “the Little One”) (Note: This emir was previously designated Muhammad XI but following publication of a new Nasrid-era Arabic source, Ibn c Āṣim's Junnat al-Rida, it has been shown that there was no Muhammad X. This has required the renumbering of three later sultans: Muhammad XI al-Sagir, the Little One (becomes Muhammad X), Muhammad XII, Boabdil (becomes Muhammad XI), and Muhammad XIII al-Zagal (becomes Muhammad XII).) (c. 1427-1455) was the nineteenth Nasrid ruler of the Emirate of Granada on the Iberian Peninsula. His brief and turbulent rule was typical of the chronic instability that marked the final decades of Nasrid Granada before its fall in 1492.

He was born in Granada between 1427 and 1430, the son of Sultan Muhammad VIII and grandson of Yusuf III of the Nasrid dynasty. His epithet, al-Ṣaghīr, “the Little One,” likely was used to distinguish him from the older Muhammad IX, though later Christian chroniclers applied similar nicknames to other rulers. His early years unfolded amid intense dynastic rivalry. After his father’s imprisonment and execution in 1431, Muhammad and a brother were briefly held as hostages during the struggles for control of the Emirate of Granada.

Muhammad first rose to prominence under Sultan Muhammad IX (al-Aysar), who, during his fourth reign (1447–1453), designated the young prince as heir. The choice was political: as the son of a previous ruler executed by al-Aysar, Muhammad’s elevation reconciled factions that had opposed the sultan. To seal the alliance, Muhammad married one of al-Aysar’s daughters and was entrusted with command of the army. As commander, he led numerous raids along the Castilian frontier between 1447 and 1449, targeting towns from Murcia to western Andalusia. These campaigns brought booty and captives and demonstrated Granada’s continued military capacity despite internal tensions.

He was appointed governor of Almería, a traditional post for the heir. Muhammad also engaged in diplomacy, receiving envoys and co-signing a truce with Castile in 1452. When al-Aysar died in July 1453, Muhammad succeeded him, adopting the honorific title al-Mansur bi-Allah (“Victorious by God”). He initially confirmed the existing truce with Castile, maintaining relative stability during the transition of power.

His reign, however, was soon challenged by internal opposition rallying behind Abu Nasr Sa'd, a rival claimant with his own factional support. In 1454 Muhammad was forced to abdicate in Saʿd’s favor but regained the throne by early 1455. The conflict escalated into civil war, drawing in Castile’s King Henry IV, who intervened militarily in support of Saʿd. Campaigns and counter-campaigns devastated parts of the frontier, further weakening the emirate.

By late 1455 Muhammad X was again overthrown and forced to flee as a result of an unpopular truce he struck with Castile. According to Castilian chronicler Hernando de Baeza, he attempted to return to Granada but was captured, imprisoned in the Alhambra, and executed, along with his young sons.

== Sources ==
- Catlos, Brian A. (2018). Kingdoms of faith: a new history of Islamic Spain (first ed.). New York: Basic Books. ISBN 978-0-465-05587-6.
- Gallardo, B. B. (2020). "Chapter 1 The Banū Naṣr: The Founders of the Nasrid Kingdom of Granada (Thirteenth–Fifteenth Centuries)". The Nasrid Kingdom of Granada between East and West. Brill.
- Harvey, L. P. (1990). Islamic Spain, 1250 to 1500. Chicago: University of Chicago Press. ISBN 978-0-226-31960-5.
- Mediano, F. (2010). "The post-Almohad dynasties in al-Andalus and the Maghrib (seventh–ninth/thirteenth–fifteenth centuries)". The New Cambridge History of Islam. Vol. 4. Cambridge University Press.
- O'Callaghan, Joseph F. (2014). The last crusade in the West: Castile and the conquest of Granada. Middle Ages series (1st ed.). Philadelphia: University of Pennsylvania Press. ISBN 978-0-8122-4587-5.
- Vidal Castro, Francisco. "Muhammad X". Real Academia de la Historia.

Muhammad X of Granada Nasrid dynasty Cadet branch of the Banu Khazraj Died: 1454
Regnal titles
Preceded by Muhammad IX	Sultan of Granada; 1453–1454	Succeeded by Sa'd
