= Leo Africanus (novel) =

1986 novel by Amin Maalouf

- First paperback edition cover. The portrait used in the cover is of Mulay Ahmed by Peter Paul Rubens
- Author: Amin Maalouf
- Original title: Léon, l'Africain
- Translator: Peter Sluglett
- Language: French
- Genre: Historical novel
- Publisher: New Amsterdam Books
- Publication date: 1986
- Publication place: Lebanon
- English publication date: 1992
- Media type: Print (Paperback)
- Pages: 360 pp
- ISBN: 1-56131-022-0
- OCLC: 24502286
- Dewey Decimal: 843 20
- LC Class: PQ3979.2.M28 L413 1991

Leo Africanus (French: Léon l'Africain) is a 1986 novel by Amin Maalouf, written in the form of a memoir, depicting the life of the eponymous Renaissance-era traveler, Leo Africanus.

Since very little is actually known about the life of Leo, the book fills in the historical episodes, placing him in the company of many of the key historical—political and cultural—figures of his time, including Popes Leo X, Adrian VI, and Clement VII; Ottoman emperors Selim I and Suleiman the Magnificent; Boabdil, the last Moorish king of Granada; Askia Mohammad I of the Songhai Empire; Ferdinand of Spain; Francis I of France; and artist Raphael along with others.

Leo Africanus is Maalouf's first novel and has received high praise. The work explores confrontations between Islam and Christianity as well as the mutual influence that the two religions had on each other and on the people they governed.

== Summary ==
The book is divided into four sections, each organized year by year to describe a key period of the life of Leo Africanus (originally named Hasan).

The book is based on life experiences that took Leo Africanus almost everywhere in the Islamic Mediterranean, from southern Morocco to Arabia, and across the Sahara. It places Hasan/Leo in various historical events and narrates those events. While filled with biographical hypotheses and historical speculations, the book offers a vivid description of the Renaissance world, with the decline of the traditional Muslim kingdoms and the hope inspired by the Ottoman Empire, as it grew to threaten Europe and restore Muslim unity.

Each section of the book is named after the city that played the major role in Leo's life at a given time: Granada, Fez, Cairo, and Rome.

- In Granada, the book illustrates the Granada War and the Treaty of Granada which marked the end of Islamic rule in Spain, as well as the Alhambra Decree which expelled all Jews from Spain.
- In Fez, Maalouf describes the news of the failed Muslim rebellion in Granada, the discussions resulting in the Oran fatwa, the Spanish and Portuguese colonial campaigns in North Africa and their conflicts with the North African Muslims.
- In Cairo, it depicts the Ottoman–Mamluk War which ended in the Ottoman conquest of Egypt.
- In Rome, the narration includes an Ottoman embassy to France, the Italian War of 1521–26, and the War of the League of Cognac, culminating in the 1527 Sack of Rome.

== Characters ==
- Hasan ibn Muhammad al-Wazzan, later known as Leo Africanus, the titular character and the narrator of the book.
- Muhammad al-Wazzan, Hasan's father, a weighmaster in the Emirate of Granada.
- Salma, Hasan's mother and Muhammad's Arab wife.
- Warda, Hasan's stepmother and Muhammad's Castilian wife.
- Abu Marwan or Khali, Hasan's maternal uncle and a diplomat and statesman in the Kingdom of Fez.
- Harun the Ferret, Hasan's closest friend in Fez and later known as Harun Pasha, a diplomat with the Ottoman Empire.
- Hiba, a Numidian slave girl gifted to Hasan by an African lord, as well as Hasan's romantic interest.
- Nur, a Circassian princess and the widow of Selim I's rival claimant of the Ottoman throne, whom Hasan married in Cairo.
- Pope Leo X, Hasan's master after he was captured and enslaved. Later he freed Hasan and baptized him John-Leo.
- Francesco Guicciardini, an Italian statesman and one of Leo's friends in Rome.
- Julius de' Medici, later Pope Clement VII, Leo's benefactor after the death of Leo X.
- Abbad the Soussi, a merchant who was captured together with Hasan, and later became known as Master Abbado, a successful merchant in Naples, and Leo's friend in Italy.
