= Morayma =

Last sultana of Granada (1467–1493)

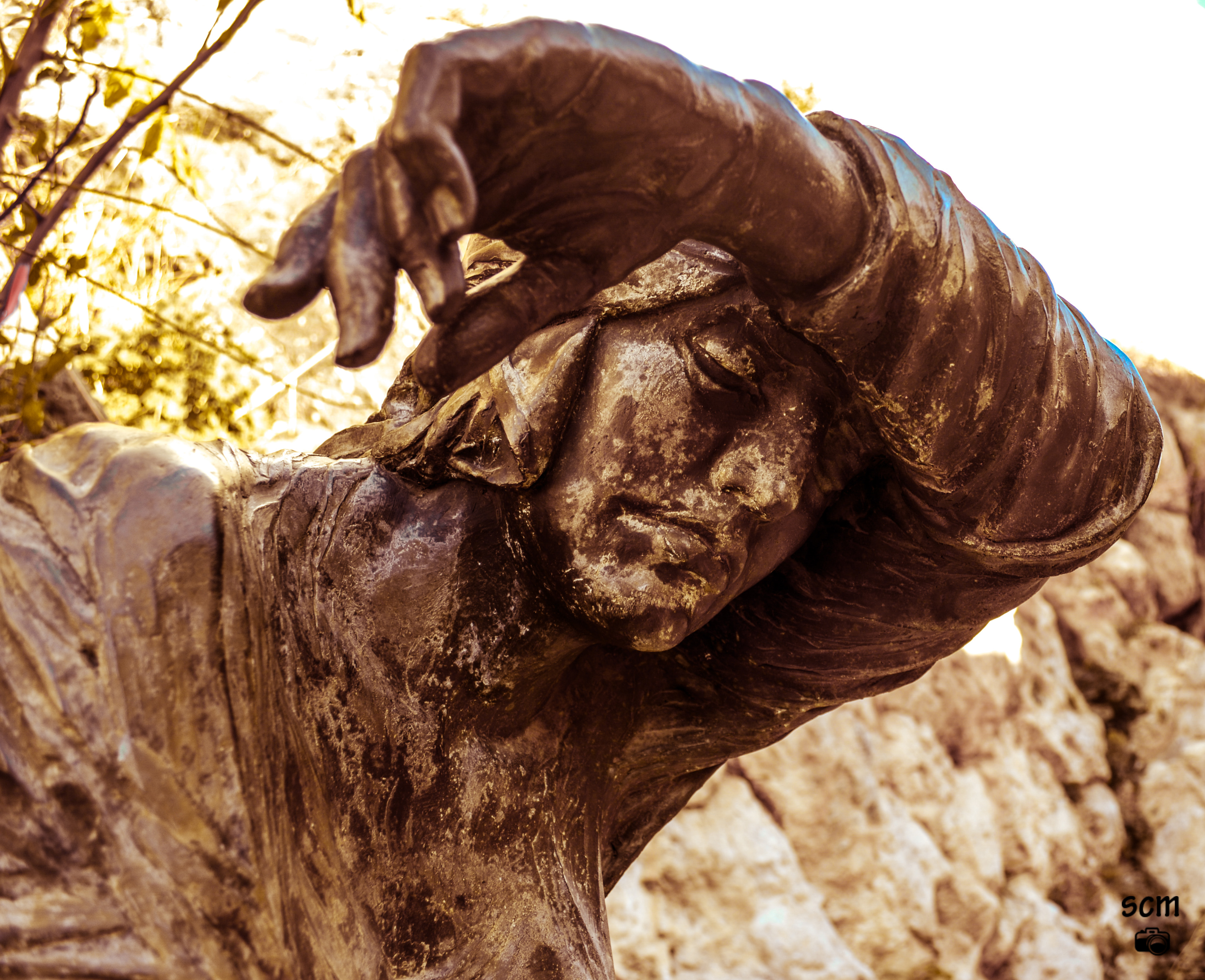
- A statue of Morayma in Loja

Sultana of Granada
- Tenure: 1482 - 1483
- Tenure: 1487 - 2 January 1492
- Born: c. 1467
- Died: 1493 (aged 25–26); Andarax Laujar, Kingdom of Castile
- Spouse: Muhammad XI of Granada (m. 1482)
- Issue: Aixa; Ahmed; Yusef
- House: Nasrid (by marriage)
- Father: Ali Athar, M. de Xagra

Maryam bint Ibrahim al-’Attar (Arabic: مريم بنت إبراهيم العطّار) (1467 – 1493) also known as Morayma (مُرَيْمَةَ, lit. 'Little Maryam') (also Moraima, Murayma) was the last sultana of Granada as the spouse of Muhammad XI of Granada. She has been used as an inspiration by many authors and often portrayed within fiction.

== Biography ==
She was the daughter of Ali Athar, M. de Xagra, a top Nasirid military leader who was Granada's governor in Loja as well a court functionary.

Morayma is described as beautiful and religious. Her wedding took place in 1482. Shortly thereafter, she and her husband were imprisoned by her father-in-law. They were liberated by the Kingdom of Castile in 1483, but their children were kept as hostages. Her husband, Muhammad XI (known as Boabdil) had agreed to terms with the Spanish to surrender Granada, and at various times had been allied with the Spanish against his father. She did not see her children until after the fall of Granada in 1492.

Morayma followed her spouse in exile to Andarax Laujar but died shortly before they could leave for Fes in 1493.

== Issue ==
- Aixa, later known as Sister Isabel de Granada.
- Ahmed
- Yusef
