= The Moor's Last Sigh =

1995 novel by Salman Rushdie

- The first edition
- Author: Salman Rushdie
- Language: English
- Genre: Fiction novel
- Publisher: Random House
- Publication date: 1995
- Publication place: United Kingdom
- Media type: Print
- ISBN: 0-679-74466-5
- Preceded by: The Satanic Verses
- Followed by: The Ground Beneath Her Feet

The Moor's Last Sigh is the fifth novel by Salman Rushdie, published in 1995. It is set in the Indian cities of Bombay and Cochin.

== Title and influences ==
The title is taken from the story of Boabdil, the last Moorish king of Granada, who is also mentioned frequently in the book. The spot from which Boabdil last looked upon Granada after surrendering is known as Puerto del Suspiro del Moro ("Pass of the Moor's Sigh"). The mother of the narrator and an artist friend of the mother's each make a painting which they call "The Moor's Last Sigh".

The book draws on a variety of real historical figures and events, including Boabdil's surrender of Granada, the demolition of the Babri Masjid, the 1993 Bombay bombings, the gangster and terrorist Dawood Ibrahim, as well as modern Indian political entities like Bal Thackeray and the Shiv Sena. Salman Rushdie mentions Thomas Babington Macaulay in this novel.

== Plot details ==
The Moor's Last Sigh traces four generations of the narrator's family and the ultimate effects upon the narrator. The narrator, Moraes Zogoiby, traces his family's beginnings down through time to his own lifetime. Moraes, who is called "Moor" throughout the book, is an exceptional character, whose physical body ages twice as fast as a normal person's does and also has a deformed hand. The book also focuses heavily on the Moor's relationships with the women in his life, including his mother Aurora, who is a famous national artist; his first female tutor; his three older sisters, Ina, Minnie and Mynah; and his first love, a charismatic, demented sculptor named Uma.

== Awards and nominations ==
The book won the Whitbread Prize for 'Best novel' in 1995, and the Aristeion Prize in 1996. The book was also shortlisted for the Booker Prize in 1995.

The cover artwork for this book is by Dennis Leigh, more widely known as musician and multi-media artist John Foxx.

== Critical reception ==
Reviewing the novel in the New York Times upon its publication, Norman Rush wrote, "[T]his novel, looked at as a work of literary art, is a triumph, an intricate and deceptive one.... So, another brave and dazzling fable from Salman Rushdie, one that meets the test of civic usefulness -- broadly conceived -- as certainly as it fulfills the requirements of true art." On 5 November 2019 BBC Arts included The Moor's Last Sigh on its list of the 100 most influential novels.

== See also ==
- Alhambra
