= Rebellion of the Alpujarras =

The Rebellion of the Alpujarras may refer to:

- Rebellion of the Alpujarras (1499–1501)
- Rebellion of the Alpujarras (1568–1571)
