= Tomb of Sidi Bel Kacem =

Memorial monument in Fez, Morocco

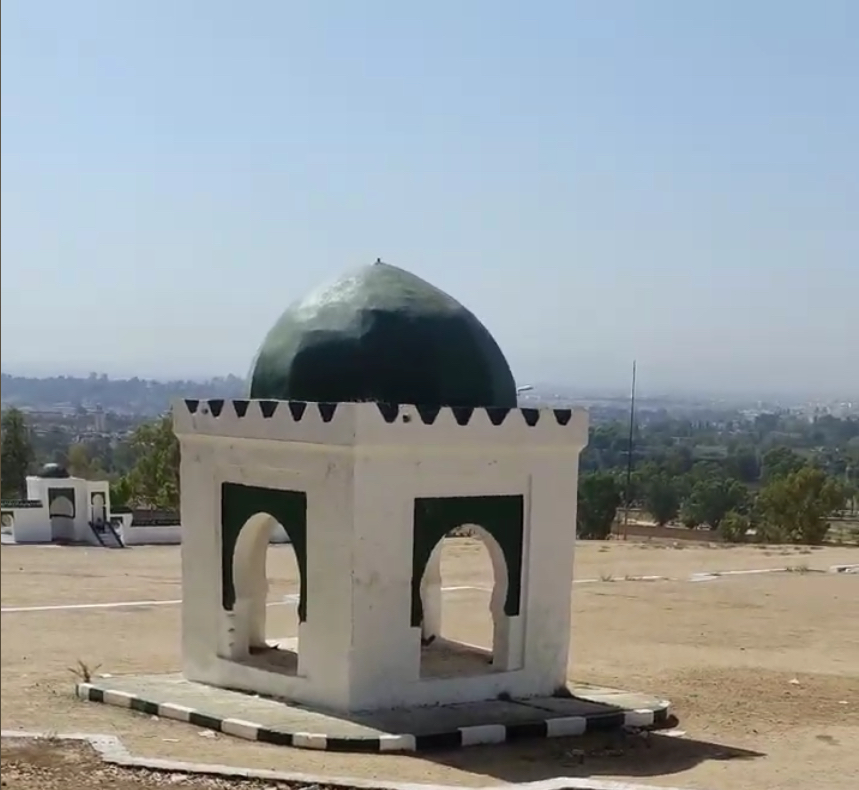

Religion
- Affiliation: Islam
- Status: The musalla is still in use

Location
- Location: Fez, Morocco

Architecture
- Type: mausoleum
- Completed: Unknown

The Tomb of Sidi Bel Kacem (Arabic: قبر سيدي أبو القاسم) or Qubba Sidi Ibrahim al-Shakdani (قبة سيدي إبراهيم الشكداني) or Boabdil's Tomb (قبر ابو عبد الله) is a historic memorial monument located in Fez, Morocco. It entombs the remains of a local mystic, Sidi Ibrahim al-Shakdani, as well as purportedly the last Nasrid ruler of Granada, Abu Abdallah Muhammad XI (also known as Boabdil). The small domed tomb (qubba) is located next to a local musalla outside Bab Mahrouk, a historic gate of Fes el Bali.

== Etymology ==
The name of the building, Sidi Bel Kacem, is derived from a Spanish rendition of the name Sidi Abu al-Qasim. Abu al-Qasim was the kunya of the local patron saint, Sidi Ibrahim al-Shakdani, who was buried here two hundred years after Abu Abdallah, also known as Boabdil (its Spanish rendition).

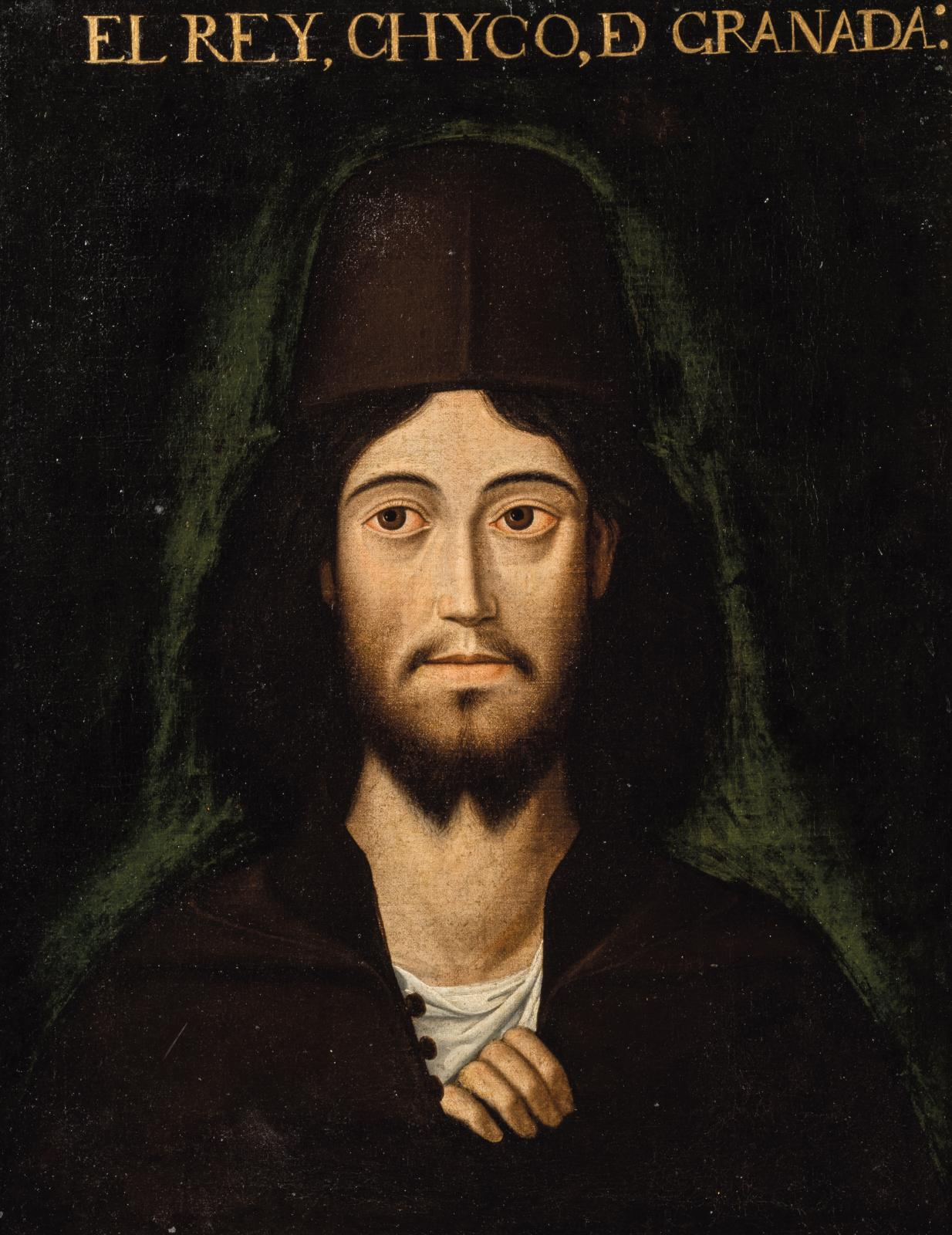
17th-century portrait of Boabdil

== History ==
Abu Abdallah Muhammad XI died in 1533, and according to the historian Al-Maqqari, he was buried at the site. At an unknown time, a domed tomb was constructed over his grave. About two hundred years later, an unrelated person, Abu al-Qasim Ibrahim al-Shakdani, was buried there as well. He was buried above Boabdil, whose body had already decayed by that time.

The mausoleum was reported to have been in a filthy condition in 2013. According to a 2021 article, its floor and inner walls were covered in garbage and it was being used as a shelter by the homeless and the drunk.

== Archeological developments ==
In 2013, a Spanish-Emirati research team conducted a geo-radar scan on the floor of the shrine. The results revealed two tombstones, and deeper down, two skeletons were revealed as well. It was concluded that one of the uncovered bodies belonged to Sidi Abu al-Qasim Ibrahim al-Shakdani, while the other one was theorized to have been the body of Boabdil. To prove the latter, the team proposed an excavation to extract the body, but they were denied permission to do so.

== See also ==
- Marabout
