= Muhammad XI of Granada =

Ruler of the Emirate of Grenada (1460–1533)

Muhammad XI
- Sultan
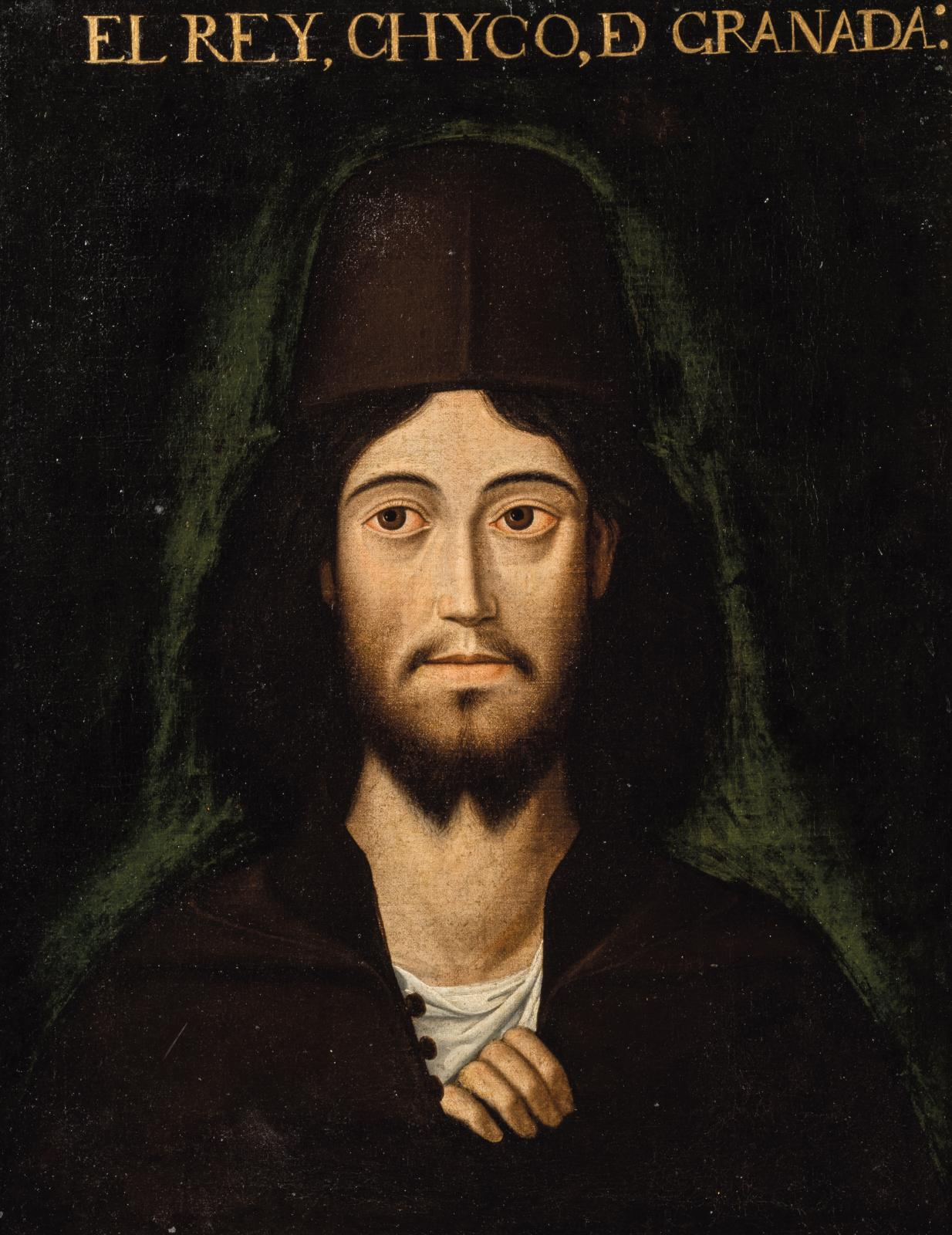
- Portrait by anonymous, 17th century, private collection

Sultan of Granada
- 1st reign: 1482–1483
- Predecessor: Abu l-Hasan Ali
- Successor: Abu l-Hasan Ali
- 2nd reign: 1487 – 2 January 1492
- Predecessor: Muhammad XII
- Successor: Position abolished
- Born: c. 1460; Alhambra, Emirate of Granada
- Died: 1533 (aged 72–73) (Note: Multiple dates and locations are suggested in different sources. See article for details.); Fes, Kingdom of Fez
- Consort: Morayma
- Issue: Ahmed; Aixa (Sor Isabel de Granada); Yusef
- House: Nasrid
- Father: Abu l-Hasan Ali
- Mother: Aixa
- Religion: Islam

Abu Abdullah Muhammad XI (Note: Arabic: أبو عبد الله محمد, romanized: Abū ʿAbdi-llāh Muḥammad; also numbered as Muhammad XII by some references.) (c. 1460–1533), known in Spanish as Boabdil, (Note: Spanish rendering of the name Abu Abdullah) was the 22nd and last Nasrid ruler of the Emirate of Granada, reigning from 1482 to 1483 and 1487 until its capitulation to the crowns of Castile and Aragon in 1492.

== Reign as Sultan ==
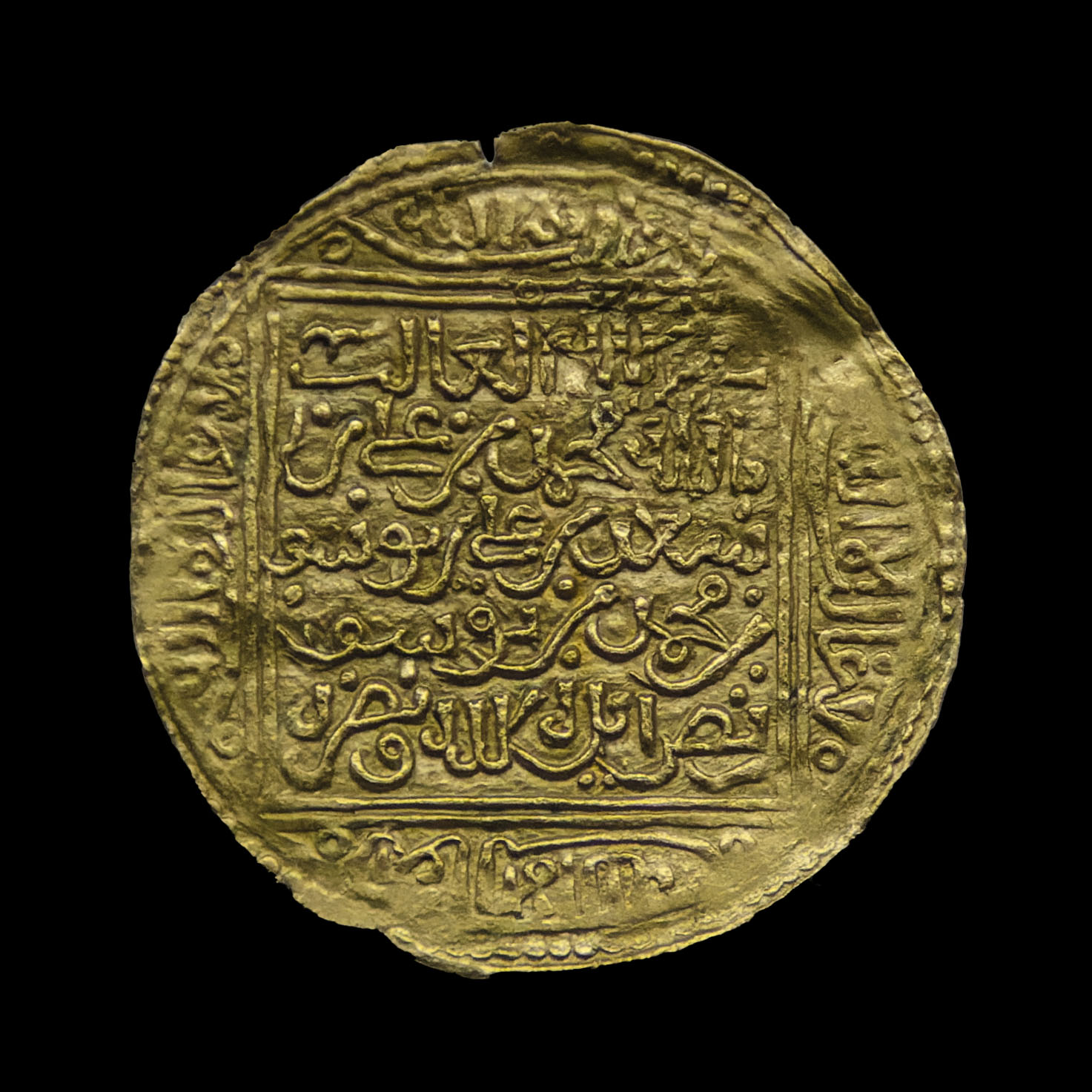
Gold dinar of Muhammad XI

Muhammad XI was the son of Abu l-Hasan Ali, Sultan of the Emirate of Granada whom he succeeded in 1482, as a result of both court intrigue and unrest amongst the population at large.

Muhammad XI soon sought to gain prestige by invading Castile, but was taken prisoner at Lucena in 1483. Muhammad's father was then restored as ruler of Granada, to be replaced in 1485 by his uncle Muhammad XII, also known as Muhammad al-Zaghal.

Muhammad obtained his freedom and Christian support to recover his throne in 1487, by consenting to hold Granada as a tributary kingdom under the Catholic monarchs. He further undertook not to intervene in the Siege of Málaga, in which Málaga was taken by the Christians.

Following the fall of Málaga and Baza in 1487, Almuñécar, Salobreña and Almería were taken by the Christians the following year. By the beginning of 1491, Granada was the only Muslim-governed city in Iberia.

== Surrender of Granada ==
In 1491, Muhammad XI was summoned by Isabella I of Castile and Ferdinand II of Aragon to surrender the city of Granada, which was besieged by the Castilians. Eventually, on 2 January 1492, Granada was surrendered. The royal procession moved from Santa Fe to a place a little more than a mile from Granada, where Ferdinand took up his position by the banks of the Genil. A later account of the capitulation is recorded by Gabriel Rodríguez de Ardila, saying:

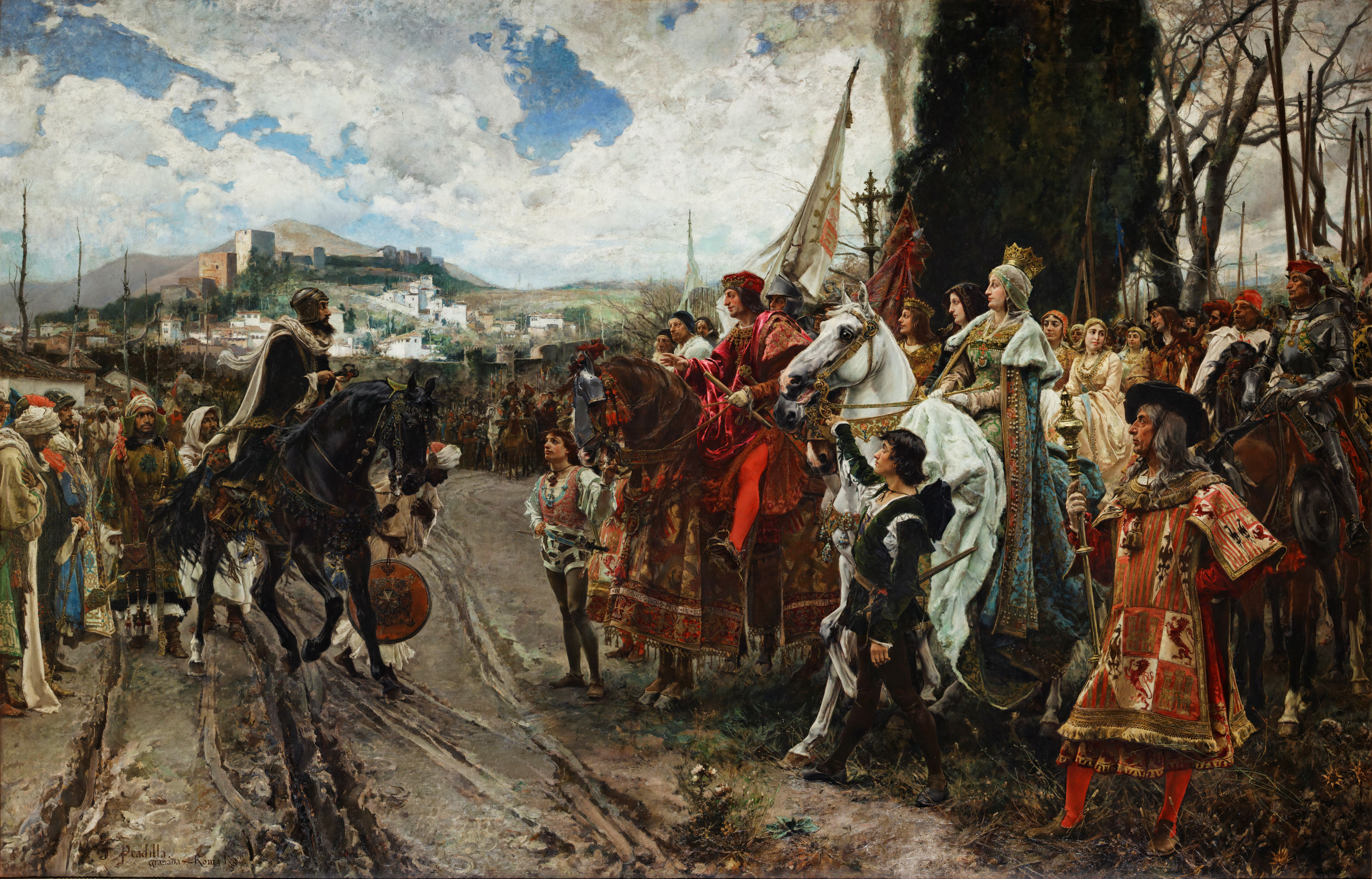
The Capitulation of Granada by Francisco Pradilla Ortiz, 1882: Muhammad XI surrenders to Ferdinand and Isabella

The Moorish King arrived where King Ferdinand was, and approaching him, he removed his turban and dismounted his horse as was agreed. He told King Ferdinand not to dismount. He approached him and kissed his arm, giving him two keys to the main gates of the Alhambra, and said to him in his own language: "God loves you very much; these, my lord, are the keys to this Paradise." Moving aside a little, he asked to whom the King and Queen had given the charge of the Alcazaba of the Alhambra, and telling him that it was the Count of Tendilla, he asked him to be summoned. Taking a gold ring from his finger with a turquoise stone on which were written these letters: Lei Lehe Ille Ali Lchu, Alan Tabilu Aben Abi Abdilchi; which translated into our Castilian read: There is no other God but the true God: and this is the seal of Aben Abi Abdilchi; he gave it to him, and said: With this ring Granada has been governed since it was ruled by the Moors, take it so that you may govern it with it: and may God make you happier than me...

Christopher Columbus seems to have been present; he refers to the surrender:

After your Highnesses ended the war of the Moors who reigned in Europe, and finished the war of the great city of Granada, where this present year 1492 on the 2nd January I saw the royal banners of Your Highnesses planted by force of arms on the towers of the Alhambra.

== Exile and death ==
=== Exile ===
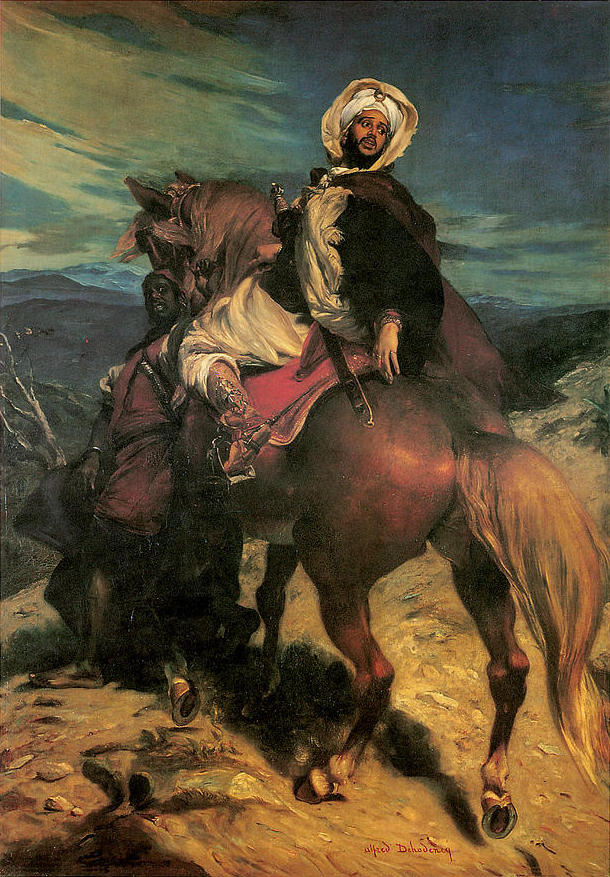
Boabdil's Farewell to Granada by Alfred Dehodencq (1822–1882).

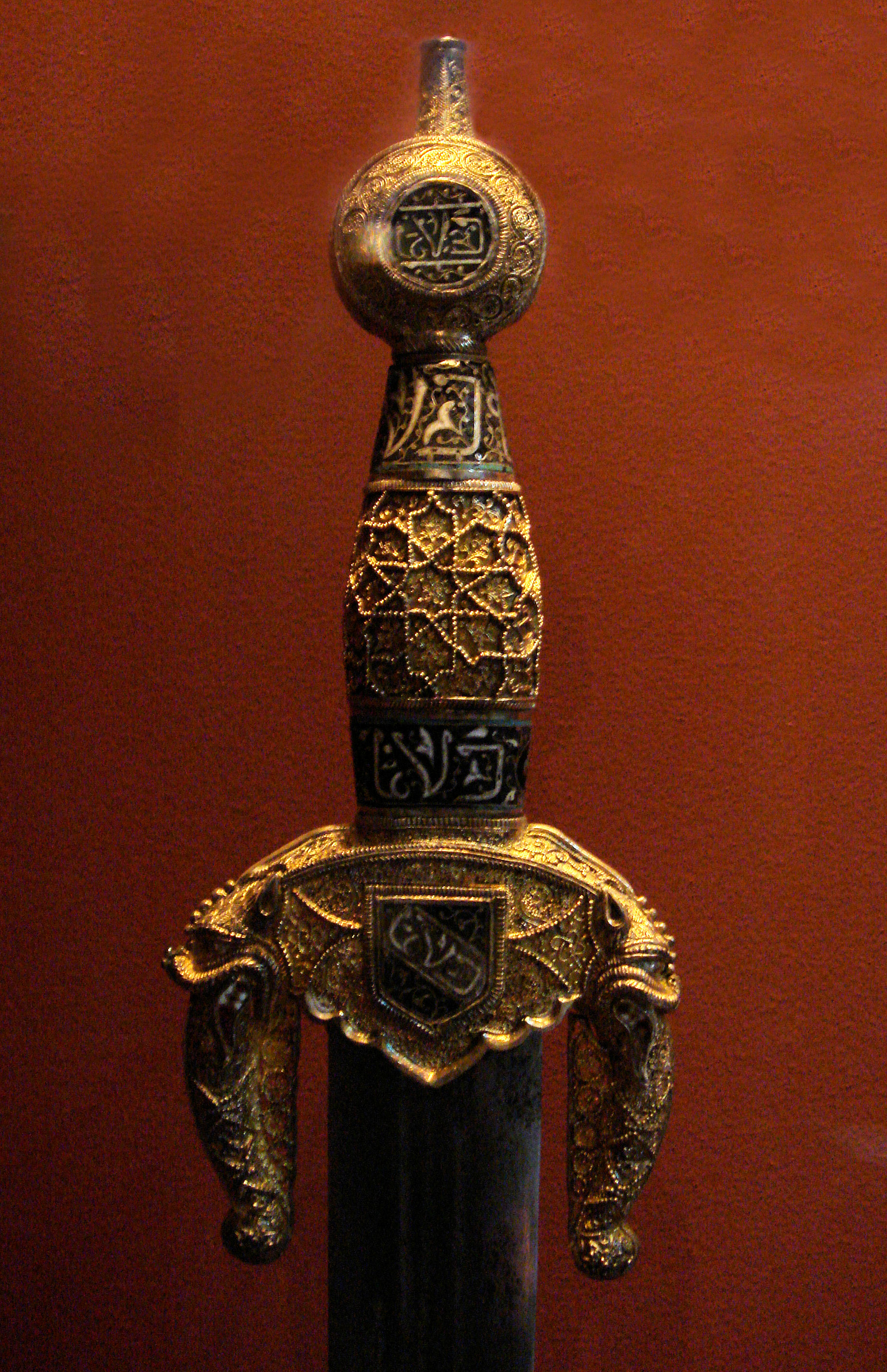
Sword of Boabdil, Musée de Cluny.

Legend has it that as Muhammad XI went into exile, he reached a rocky prominence which gave a last view of the city. Here he reined in his horse and viewed for the last time the Alhambra and the green valley that spread below. The place where this allegedly took place is today known as the Suspiro del Moro, "the Moor's sigh". Muhammad mourned his loss, and continued his journey to exile accompanied by his mother—who is supposed to have snapped, "Weep, weep like a woman, over what you couldn't defend like a man."

Muhammad XI was given an estate in Laujar de Andarax, Las Alpujarras, a mountainous area between the Sierra Nevada and the Mediterranean Sea. He crossed the Mediterranean in exile, departing in October 1493 from Adra and landing in Cazaza. He settled in Fes (present-day Morocco), which was under Marinid rule. He was accompanied by an entourage of 1,130 courtiers and servants. Large numbers of the Muslim population of Granada had already fled to North Africa, taking advantage of a clause in the articles of surrender that permitted free passage.

Shortly after his surrender, Muhammad Boabdil also sent a long letter to the Marinid rulers in Fes Morocco asking for refuge. The letter begins with a long poem praising the Marinids, followed by a prose passage where he laments his defeat and asks forgiveness for past wrongdoings of his forefathers against the Marinids. The entire text was reported by al-Maqqari:

...The lord of Castile has proposed for us a respectable residence and has given us assurances of safety to which he pledged by his own handwriting, enough to convince the souls. But we, as descendants of Banu al-Ahmar, didn't settle for this and our faith in God does not permit us to reside under the protection of disbelief. We also received from the east many letters full of goodwill, inviting us to come to their lands and offering the best of advantages. But we cannot choose other than our home and the home of our forefathers, we can only accept the protection of our relatives, not because of opportunism but to confirm the brotherhood relationship between us and to fulfill the testament of our forefathers, that tells us not to seek any help other than that of the Marinids and not to let anything obstruct us from going to you. So we traversed the vast lands and sailed the tumultuous sea and we hope that we would not be returned and that our eyes will be satisfied and our heart and grievous souls will be healed from this great pain... — Muhamad Abu Abdallah

=== Death ===
The 17th-century historian al-Maqqari wrote that Muhammad XI crossed the Mediterranean to Melilla then went to Fes where he built a palace. He stayed there until his death in 1518 or 1533. He is said to have been buried in a small domed tomb near a musalla (place of prayer), located outside of Bab Mahrouk in Fes. Muhammad XI was survived by two sons; Yusef and Ahmed. Al-Maqqari met with his descendants in 1618 in Fes; they lived in a state of poverty and relied on the Zakat.

Spanish chronicler Luis del Mármol Carvajal wrote "Muhammad XII died near the Oued el Assouad (Black River) at ford told Waqûba during the war between the Marinids and the Saadians", placing his death in 1536. This source is also taken by Louis de Chénier, a diplomat of King Louis XVI of France, in his Historical research on the Moors and History of the Empire of Morocco published in Paris in 1787.

An alternative final resting place for Muhammad XI is suggested by the late nineteenth century Arabist M.C. Brosselard, who translated a lengthy prescription in Andalusian script on a three-foot long onyx slab held in the town museum of Tlemcen. This epitaph marked the tomb of the exiled king our lord Abu-Abdullah who died in Tlemcen in May 1494, aged thirty-four. The conflict between places and dates of death may arise from confusion between Muhammad XI and his uncle El Zagal, who also died in North African exile. Brosselard's interpretation has been rejected by some later historians.

== Muhammad XI in popular culture ==
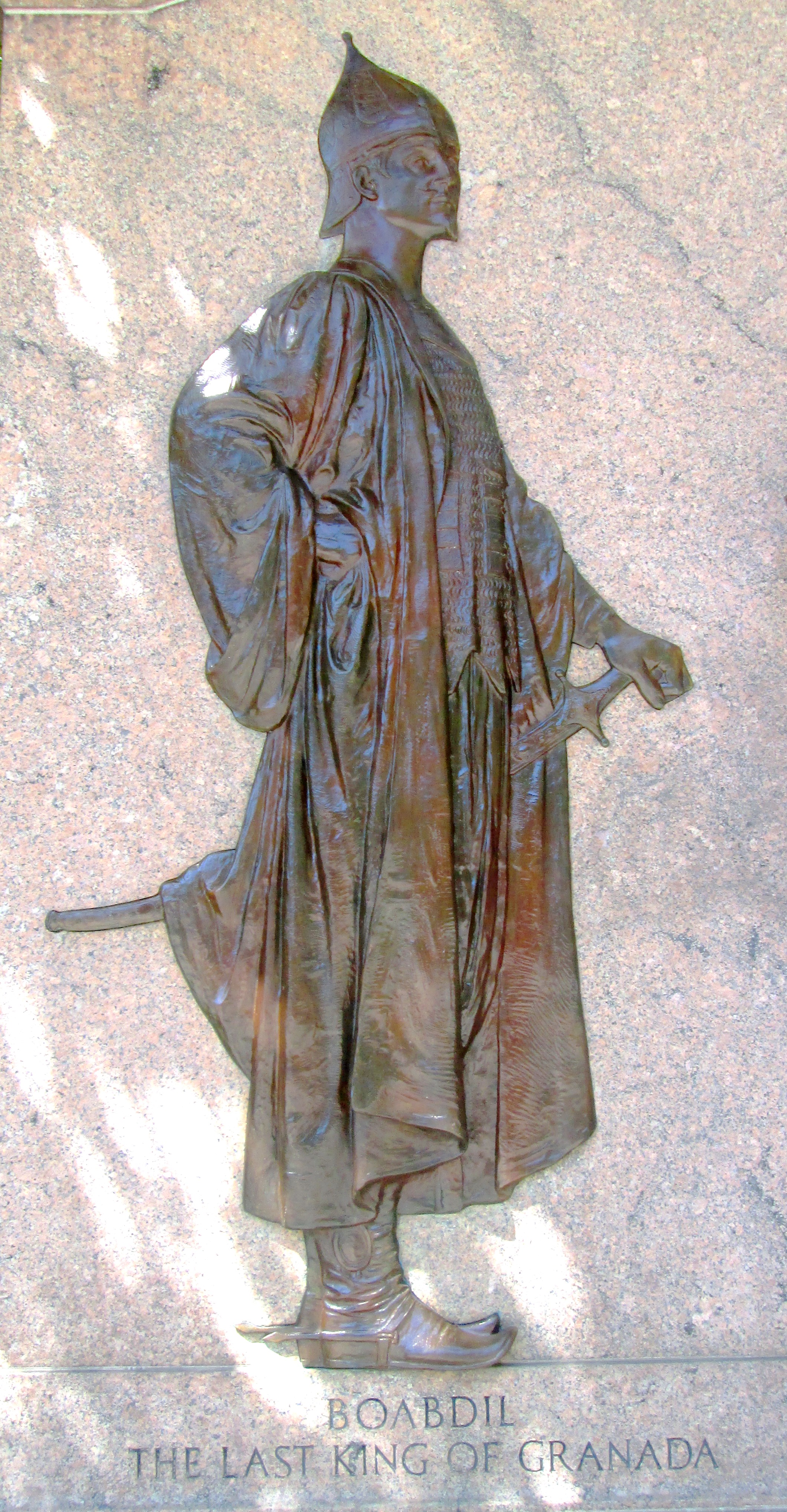
Statue of Boabdil at the Washington Irving Memorial

- He is a main character in John Dryden's The Conquest of Granada, a heroic drama in two parts, 1672.
- He is mentioned often by Washington Irving in Tales of the Alhambra (1832), particularly in the chapter "Mementos of Boabdil."
- He was the subject of the three-act opera Boabdil, der letzte Maurenkönig, Op. 49, written in 1892 by the Jewish-German-Polish composer Moritz Moszkowski.
- Spanish composer Gaspar Cassadó wrote the Lamento de Boabdil for cello and piano, in memory of the king.
- Spanish composer Antón García Abril wrote the 'Elegía a la pérdida de la Alhambra' from his song cycle Canciones del Jardin Secreto for voice and piano; it is set to text (in Andalusian Arabic) that is attributed to Boabdil, in which he laments the loss of the Alhambra.
- Abu Abdallah appears as the main character in "De Ongelukkige" published in 1915 by Dutch author Louis Couperus. This novel covers the last decade of Abu Abdallah's reign as ruler of the Emirate of Granada.
- In the 1931 anthology If It Had Happened Otherwise, the alternate history scenario "If the Moors in Spain Had Won" by Philip Guedalla has the premise of Boabdil winning the war against the Spanish, and his kingdom persisting into the 20th century.
- He figures in the video game Assassin's Creed II: Discovery for the iOS and Nintendo DS, as an ally of the Assassins.
- He is portrayed by Khalid Abdalla in the film Assassin's Creed (2016).
- Andalusian singer-songwriter and poet Carlos Cano dedicated a song to Muhammad XI in his album Crónicas Granadinas, entitled Caída del Rey Chico.
- Salman Rushdie's book, The Moor's Last Sigh, also features consistent references to Muhammad XI.
- He appears as a character in Leo Africanus by Amin Maalouf.
- Louis Aragon's book Le Fou d'Elsa renders a dramatized and poetic version of the story of Granada's capture, which includes Muhammad XI as one of the two main characters present in the novel, (Majnun being the other. Elsa, whom it could be argued is the second major character, is absent from the book.).
- Pakistan Television Corporation (PTV) produced a drama in 1980, based on the novel "Shaheen" by Nasim Hijazi. In this drama Abu Abdullah Muhammad XI was played by Shakeel Ahmed.
- Also in 1980 (22 November until 7 February 1981), he appeared in the comics supplement to the Portuguese newspaper A Capital in a 12-page comics story on the conquest of Granada with Boabdil as the main character, Luz do Oriente ("Light of the Orient"). The script was by popular literature writer and bookman Jorge Magalhães and the drawing was by Portuguese-Guinean sculptor, painter and comic book artist Augusto Trigo.
- Boabdil appeared as main character in the Spanish eight-episode serial Requiem por Granada (1991). In this serial, he was played by Manuel Bandera. Young Boabdil was played by Lucas Martín.
- Boabdil appeared as a main character in season two of the Spanish TV Series Isabel (2013). In this show, he was played by Álex Martínez.
- He appeared as a main character in the novel Court of Lions (2017) by Jane Johnson.
- He appears as a character in G. Willow Wilson’s novel, The Bird King (2019), which is set during 1491 and the arrival of the Spanish Inquisition. The protagonist Fatima is his concubine.
- Nathaniel Mackey's poem "Sigh of the Moor" in Splay Anthem is built around the motif of Boabdil’s abdication.
- Keith Bradbury's novel "Let the Dead Hold Your Hand" features the story of Boabdil and the search to find his final resting place.
- He appears in The Queen’s Vow, a novel of Isabella of Castile by C.W. Gortner.
- He appears in the E. T. A. Hoffmann short story "Das Sanctus" (or "The Sanctus") as the antagonist.

== See also ==
- Battle of Lucena, the capture of Muhammad XI of Granada
- Al Andalus
- Alhambra Decree
- Reconquista
- Treaty of Granada

== Notes ==
Muhammad XI of Granada Nasrid dynasty Cadet branch of the Banu Khazraj Born: 1460? Died: 1533?
Regnal titles
Preceded by Abu l-Hasan Ali	Sultan of Granada; 1482–1483	Succeeded by Abu l-Hasan Ali
Preceded by Muhammad XII	Sultan of Granada; 1487–1492	Granada captured by Castile
