= Rebellion of the Alpujarras (1499–1501) =

Uprisings by Muslims in southern Iberia

- The Kingdom of Granada in Castile
| Date | December 1499 – April 1501; 1 year and 4 months |
| Location | The city of Granada and the Alpujarra, Kingdom of Granada, Crown of Castile |
| Result | Rebellion defeated |

Belligerents
| Spain | Muslims of Granada |

Commanders and leaders
| Ferdinand II of Aragon; Isabella I of Castile; Francisco Jiménez de Cisneros; Marquis de Tendilla; Alonso de Aguilar † | Unknown |

Strength
| 80,000 | Unknown |

The first rebellion of the Alpujarras of 1499–1501 (Arabic: ثورة البشرات الأولى) was a series of uprisings by the Muslim population of the Kingdom of Granada, Crown of Castile (formerly, the Emirate of Granada) against their Catholic rulers. They began in 1499 in the city of Granada in response to mass forced conversions of the Muslim population to the Catholic faith, which were perceived as violations of the 1491 Treaty of Granada. The uprising in the city quickly died down, but it was followed by more serious revolts in the nearby mountainous area of the Alpujarras. The Catholic forces, on some occasions led personally by King Ferdinand, succeeded in suppressing the revolts and inflicted severe punishment on the Muslim population.

The Catholic rulers used these revolts as a justification to repudiate the Treaty of Granada and abrogate the rights of the Muslims guaranteed by the treaty. All Muslims of Granada were subsequently required to convert to Catholicism or be expelled, and in 1502 these forced conversions applied to all of Castile. However, they did not apply in the kingdoms of Valencia or Aragon.

== Background ==
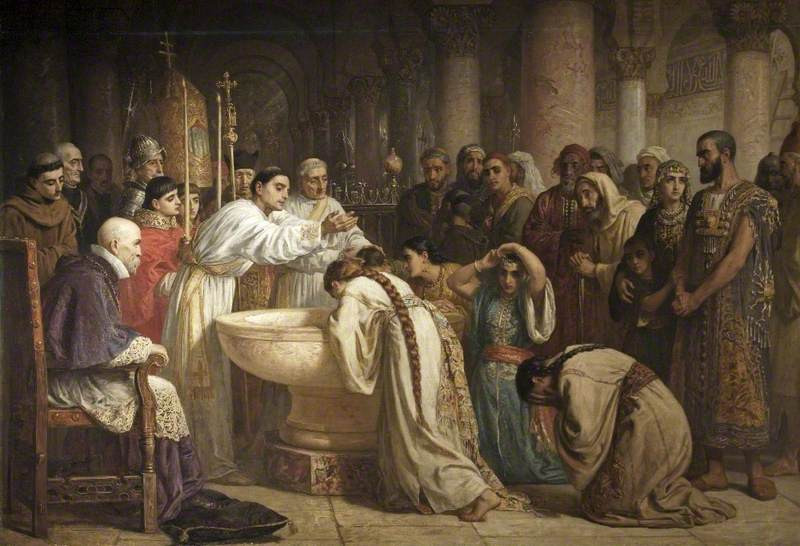
Forced conversions under Francisco Jiménez de Cisneros were considered violations of the Treaty of Granada and were the main trigger of the rebellion.

Muslims had been present in the Iberian peninsula since the Umayyad conquest of Hispania in the 8th century. By the end of the 15th century, the Emirate of Granada was the last Muslim-ruled area in the peninsula. In January 1492, after a decade-long campaign, Muhammad XI of Granada (also known as "Boabdil") surrendered the Emirate to the Catholic forces led by the Catholic monarchs Ferdinand II of Aragon and Isabella I of Castile. The Treaty of Granada, signed on November 1491, guaranteed a set of rights to the Muslims of Granada, including religious tolerance and fair treatment, in return for the capitulation.

At this point, the Muslim population in the former Emirate of Granada was estimated to be between 250,000 and 300,000, making up the majority in the former emirate, and constituting roughly half of the entire Muslim population in Spain.

Initially, the Catholic rulers upheld the treaty. Despite pressure from the Spanish clergy, Ferdinand and the Archbishop of Granada Hernando de Talavera chose a laissez-faire policy towards the Muslims in the hope that interaction with Catholics would make them "understand the error" of their faith and abandon it. When Ferdinand and Isabella visited the city in the summer of 1499, they were greeted by enthusiastic crowds, including Muslims.

In the summer of 1499, Francisco Jiménez de Cisneros, the archbishop of Toledo, arrived in Granada and began working alongside Talavera. Cisneros disliked Talavera's approach and began sending uncooperative Muslims, especially the noblemen, to prison, where they were treated harshly until they agreed to convert. Emboldened by the increase in conversions, Cisneros intensified the efforts and in December 1499 he told Pope Alexander VI that three thousand Muslims converted in a single day. Cisneros' own church council warned that these methods might be a breach of the Treaty, and sixteenth-century hagiographer Álvar Gómez de Castro described the approach as "methods that were not correct".

== Uprising in the Albayzín ==
The increasing forced conversions of Muslims triggered resistance, initially among the urban population of the Albayzín (also spelled Albaicín), the Muslim quarter of Granada. The situation was exacerbated by the treatment of elches, former Christians who converted to Islam. Specific clauses in the Treaty of Granada forbade the conversion of the elches back to Christianity against their will, but the treaty allowed for questionings of such converts by Christian clerics, in the presence of Muslim religious authorities. Cisneros used this 'loophole' to summon elches and imprison those who refused to return to Christianity. These efforts were often focused on wives of Muslim men – an emphasis that angered the Muslim population who considered this a violation of their families.

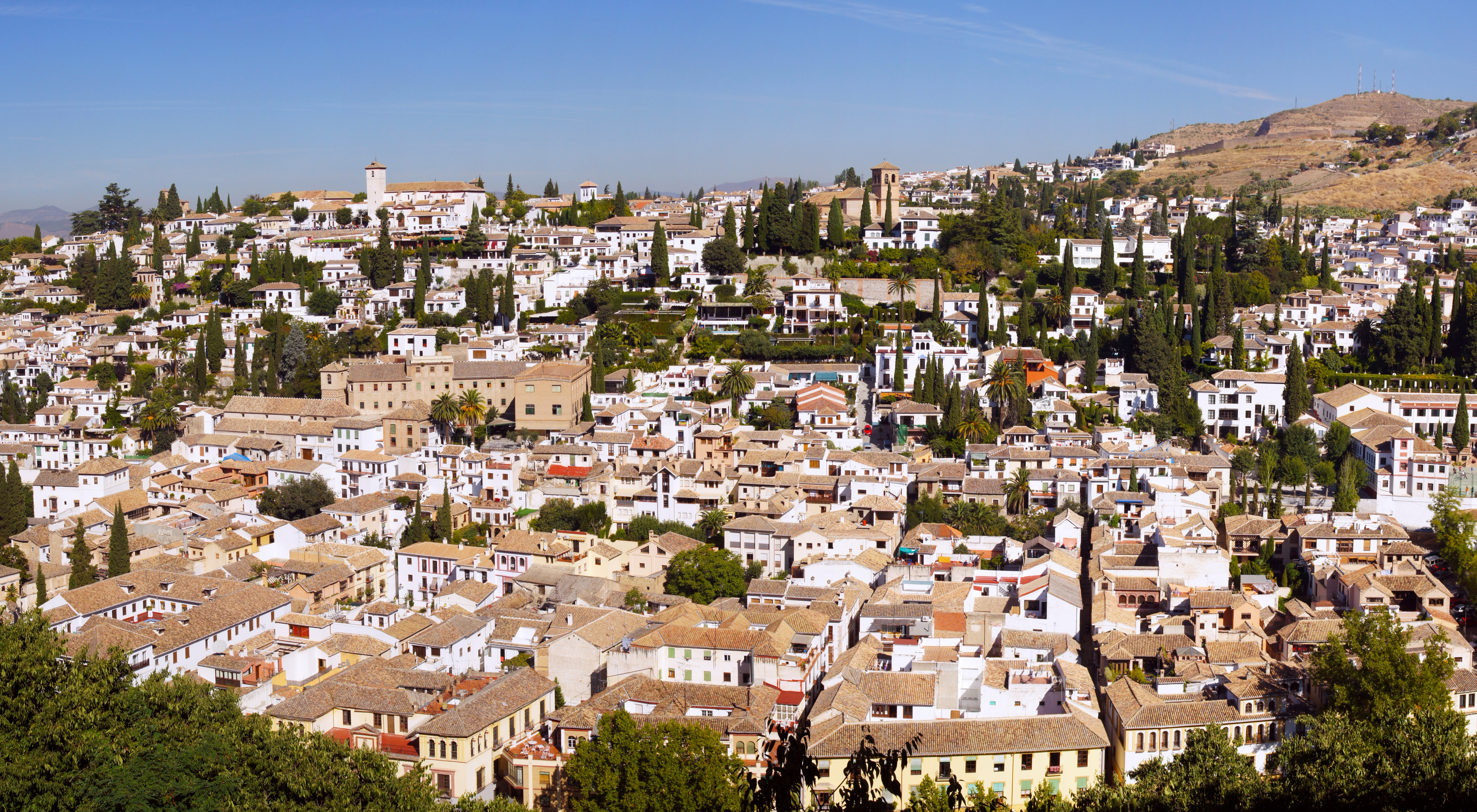
A 2010 panorama of the Albayzín, where the initial uprising took place

On 18 December 1499, as part of this effort, constable Velasco de Barrionuevo and an assistant were taking a female elche from the Albayzín for such questioning. When they passed through a square, she shouted that she was being forced to become Christian. The officials were then surrounded by a hostile crowd, the constable was killed and the assistant managed to escape after being sheltered by a local Muslim woman.

This incident escalated into an open revolt. The residents of the Albayzín barricaded the streets and armed themselves. An angry crowd marched to Cisneros' house, apparently for an assault. This crowd later dispersed, but over the following days the revolt become more organized. The population of the Albayzín elected their own officials and leaders. In the standoff that ensued, the archbishop Hernando de Talavera and the Captain-General Marquis de Tendilla attempted to defuse the situation through negotiations and gestures of good-will. After ten days, the uprising ended as the Muslims handed in their weapons and handed over the constable's killers, who were promptly executed.

Subsequently, Cisneros was summoned to the court in Seville to account for his actions, facing a furious Ferdinand. Cisneros however argued that it was the Muslims, not him, who breached the Treaty by engaging in armed rebellion. He convinced Ferdinand and Isabella to declare a collective pardon to the rebels, on condition that they convert to Christianity. Cisneros returned to Granada, which now nominally became a fully Christian city.

== Uprising in the Alpujarra ==
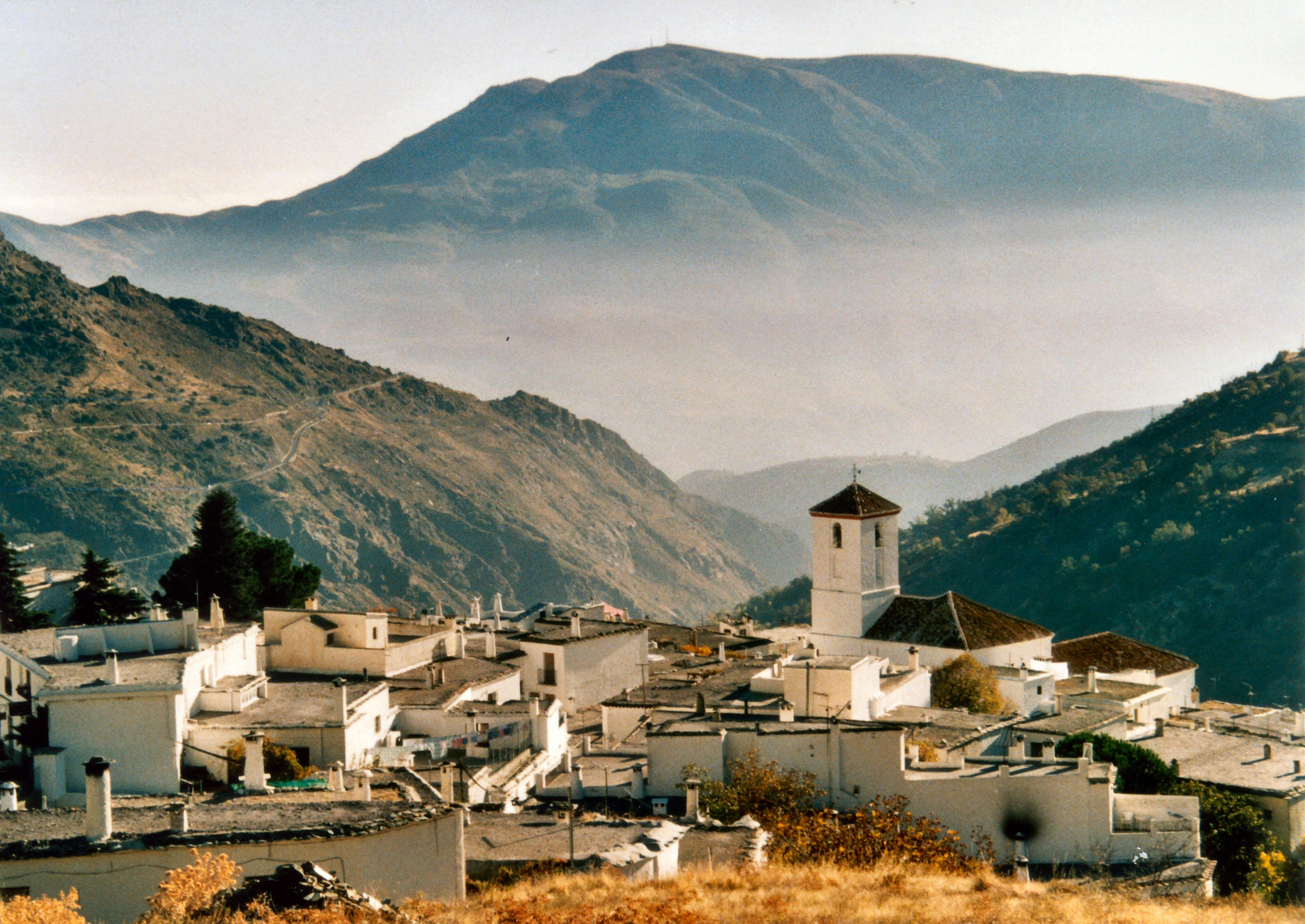
Capileira, an Alpujarran village, in 2000, which retains many features from the time of Muslim inhabitants. The uprisings took place in such villages.

Although the uprising in the Albayzín appeared to be put down and Granada was nominally transformed to a Christian city, the rebellion spread to the countryside. The leaders of the Albayzín uprising fled to the Alpujarra mountains. The inhabitants of the mountains, almost exclusively Muslims, had only accepted Christian rule reluctantly. They quickly rose up in revolts against what they regarded as the violation of the terms of the Treaty of Granada, and because they feared they would suffer the same forced conversions as the residents of the Albayzín. By February 1500, 80,000 Christian troops were mobilized to put down the rebellion. By March, King Ferdinand arrived to personally direct the operations.

The rebels were often tactically well led and made use of the mountainous terrain to conduct guerrilla warfare. However, they lacked a central leadership and coherent strategy. This was partly caused by the previous Castilian policy of encouraging and facilitating the Granadan upper class to leave the country or convert and be absorbed into the Christian upper class. The rebels' lack of strategic command allowed the Christian forces to proceed by defeating the rebels in one area separately, then moving on to the next.

The rebelling towns and villages in the Alpujarra were gradually defeated. Ferdinand personally led the assault on Lanjarón. Rebels who surrendered were generally required to be baptized in order to keep their lives. Towns and villages which had to be taken by assault were treated harshly. One of the most violent episodes occurred in Laujar de Andarax, where the Catholic forces under Louis de Beaumont took 3,000 Muslims prisoner and then slaughtered them. Between two and six hundred women and children who took refuge in a local mosque were blown up with gunpowder. During the capture of Velefique, all the men were killed and the women enslaved. At Nijar and Güéjar Sierra, the whole population was enslaved except children who were kidnapped in order to be brought up as Christians.

On 14 January 1501, Ferdinand ordered his army to stand down because the uprising seemed to be suppressed. However, further unrest occurred in Sierra Bermeja. An army under Alonso de Aguilar, one of the most distinguished captains of Spain, marched to put down this rebellion. On 16 March, the army's undisciplined troops, eager for pillage, charged the rebels. However, this was met by a fierce counterattack. The result was a catastrophe for the Catholic army; Aguilar himself was killed in battle and the army was nearly annihilated.

However, the Muslims soon sued for peace, and Ferdinand, aware of the weakness of the army and the difficulty of mountain warfare, declared that the rebels must choose between exile or baptism. Only those who could pay ten gold doblas were given passage, and the majority who could not pay had to stay and be baptized. The insurgents surrendered in waves, beginning from the middle of April, since some waited to see whether the first insurgents who surrendered were safe. The emigrants were escorted under guards to the port of Estepona and given passage to North Africa. The remaining were allowed to return home after converting, surrendering their arms, and forfeiting their property.

== Aftermath ==
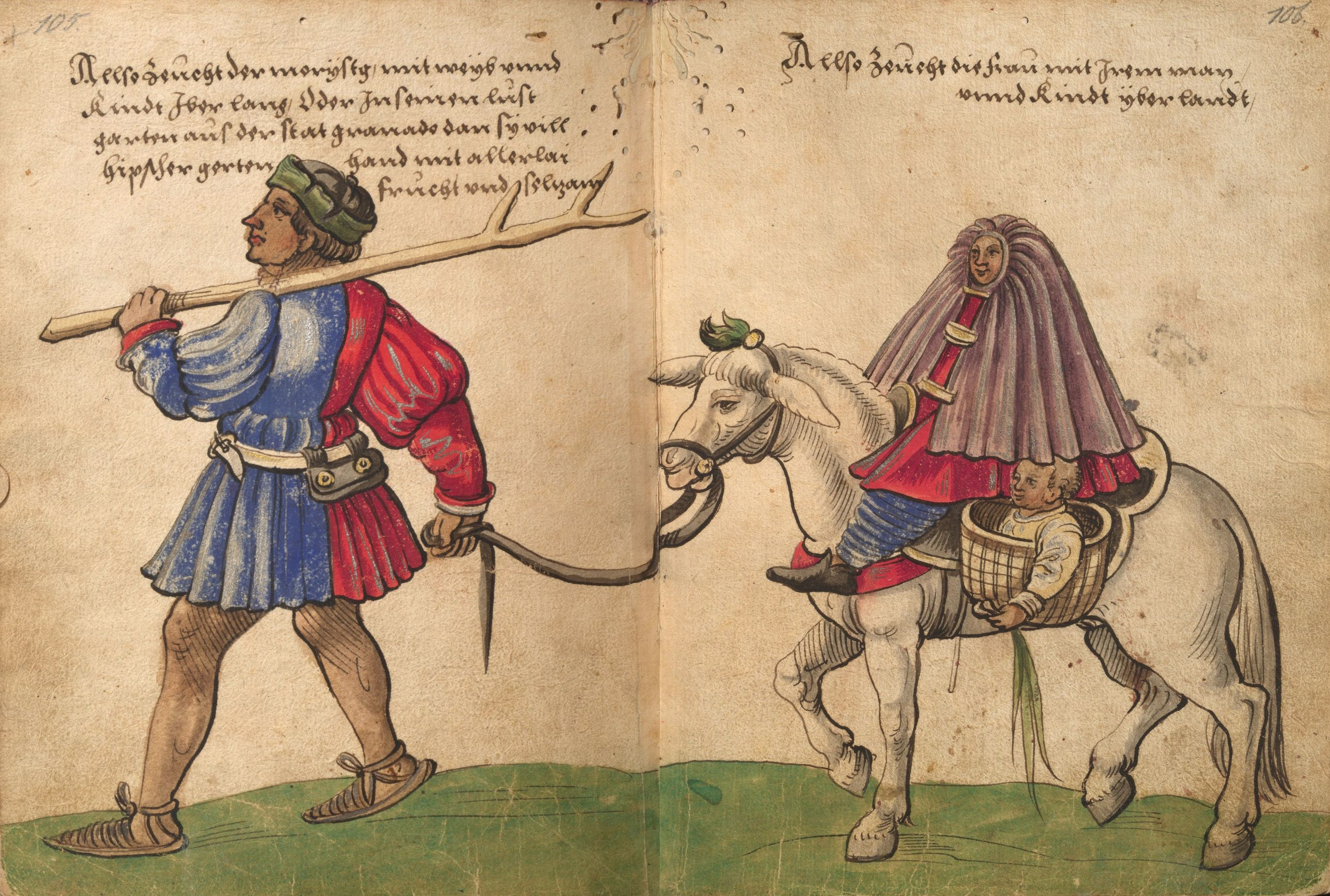
A depiction of a Morisco family, by Christoph Weiditz, 1529

By the end of 1501, the rebellion was put down. The Muslims were no longer given their rights provided by the Treaty of Granada, and were given the choice of: (1) remain and accept baptism, (2) reject baptism and be enslaved or killed, or (3) be exiled. Given the expensive fee exacted for passage out of Spain, conversion was the only realistic option for them. Therefore, only a decade after the fall of the Emirate of Granada, the entire Muslim population of Granada had nominally become Christian.

A proclamation in 1502 extended these forced conversions to the rest of the lands of Castile, even though those outside Granada had nothing to do with the rebellion. The newly converted Muslims were known as nuevos cristianos ("new Christians") or moriscos (lit. "Moorish"). Although they converted to Christianity, they maintained their existing customs, including their language, distinct names, food, dress and even some ceremonies. Many secretly practiced Islam, even as they publicly professed and practiced Christianity. In return, the Catholic rulers adopted increasingly intolerant and harsh policies in order to eradicate these characteristics. This culminated in Philip II's Pragmatica of 1 January 1567 which ordered the Moriscos to abandon their customs, clothing and language. The pragmatica triggered the Morisco revolts in 1568–1571.

== See also ==
- Expulsion of the Moriscos
- Morisco rebellions in Granada
- Mudéjar
- Reconquista
