= Puerto del Suspiro del Moro =

Mountain pass in the Sierra Nevada, Spain

- Location within Spain
- Elevation: 860 metres (2,820 ft)

Third Approach
- Location: Spain
- Range: Sierra Nevada
- Coordinates: 37°4′13″N 3°39′4″W

Puerto del Suspiro del Moro or Pass of the Moor's Sigh is a mountain pass in the Spanish Sierra Nevada.

== History ==
Muhammad XI, the last Moorish Sultan of Granada, and his court are said to have crossed this Alpujarras pass after being ejected from Granada by the Catholic Monarchs in 1492. Its name comes from the moment when he loudly sighed while looking back and longing for his Granada palaces, and in particular the Alhambra, an act which reportedly moved his mother Aisha to scold him, giving the famous quip "Llora, llora como mujer por lo que no supiste defender como hombre", meaning "Weep, weep like a woman, over what you couldn't defend like a man."

It has been on the route of the Subida Internacional Sierra Nevada bicycle race.
