= Religious uniformity =

Societal religious homogeneity, without diversity

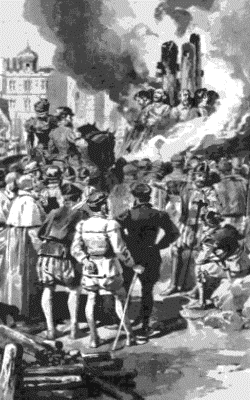
Ten Protestant Martyrs, including Richard Woodman, were burnt to death in 1557 for not espousing the official state religion

Religious uniformity occurs when government is used to promote one state religion, denomination, or philosophy to the exclusion of all other religious beliefs.

== History ==
Religious uniformity was common in many modern theocratic and atheistic governments around the world until fairly modern times. The modern concept of a separate civil government was relatively unknown until expounded upon by Roger Williams, a Christian minister, in The Bloudy Tenent of Persecution (1644) shortly after he founded the American colony of Rhode Island and Providence Plantations in 1636.

In the United States, the First Amendment to the Constitution (1791) prohibits the federal government from establishing or prohibiting a religion, and in 1947 the U.S. Supreme Court ruled that states cannot create established state churches in Everson v. Board of Education.

== See also ==
- Act of Uniformity 1549
- Religious persecution
- Christian debate on persecution and toleration
- Theocracy
