= Treaty of Granada (1491) =

1491 treaty between Granada and Castile

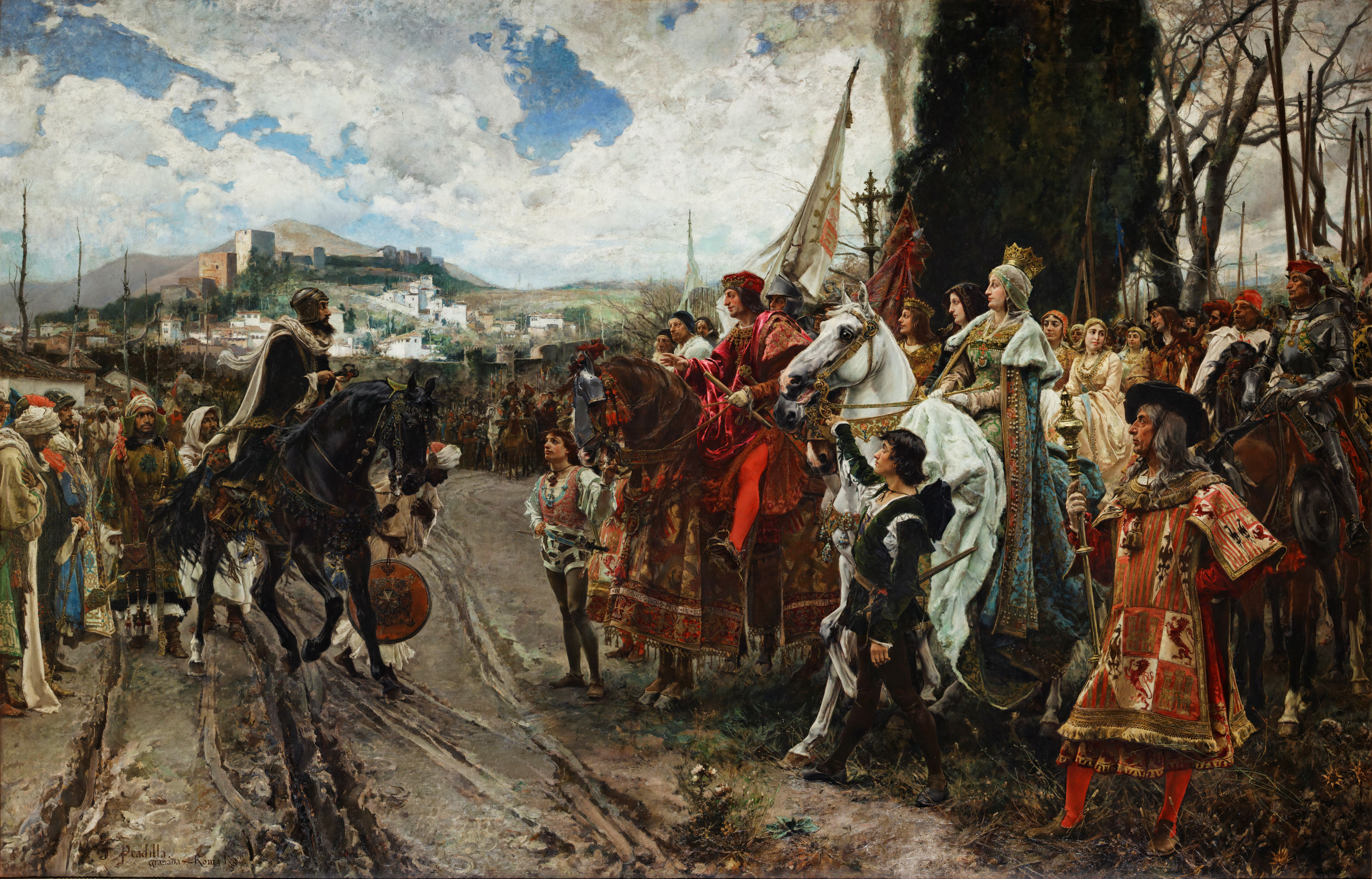
- The Surrender of Granada by Francisco Pradilla Ortiz: Boabdil surrenders to Ferdinand and Isabella
- Context: The Reconquista and the Spanish annexation of the Emirate of Granada
- Signed: November 25, 1491
- Signatories: Boabdil, Emir Muhammad XI of Granada; Ferdinand II and Isabella I

Full text
- es:Tratado de Granada at Wikisource

The Treaty of Granada, also known as the Surrender of Granada or the Capitulations, was signed and ratified on November 25, 1491, between Boabdil, the sultan of Granada, and Ferdinand and Isabella, the King and Queen of Castile, León, Aragon, and Sicily. It ended the Granada War, which had started in 1482 and culminated in the siege and battle of Granada, which began in spring 1491.

== Background ==
The Treaty of Granada was not merely a military surrender but the result of a decade of attrition known as the Granada War (1482-1492). The Nasrid Kingdom, the last vestige of Al-Andalus, was crippled by internal civil war between Sultan Boabdil (Muhammad XII) and his father and uncle.

Ferdinand and Isabella exploited this instability, capturing key cities like Malaga and Baza. By the time the siege of Granada began in the spring of 1491, the city was overcrowded with refugees and facing starvation. The treaty was negotiated in secret over several months to prevent a riot among the city's populace who were not yet ready to concede.

=== Terms ===
- The Capitulations of Granada established a comprehensive set of conditions intended to ensure a peaceful transition of power while safeguarding the legal, religious, and social rights of the Muslim inhabitants.
- The capitulation of 1492 contained sixty-seven articles among which were the following:

=== Religious rights ===
- That their mosques and the religious endowments appertaining to them should remain as they were in the times of Islam.
- That the Christians who had embraced Islam should not be compelled to relinquish it and adopt their former creed.
- That any Muslim wishing to become a Christian should be allowed some days to consider the step he was about to take, after which he was to be questioned by both a Muslim and a Christian judge concerning his intended change and if, after that examination, he still refused to return to Islam, he should be permitted to follow his own inclination.
- That no muezzin should be interrupted in the act of calling the people to prayer and no Muslim molested either in the performance of his daily devotions or in the observance of his fast or in any other religious ceremony, but if a Christian should be found laughing at them, he should be punished for it.

=== Economic rights ===
- That the Muslims should be exempted from all taxation for a certain number of years.
- That no increase should be made to the usual imposts but that on the contrary all oppressive taxes lately imposed should be immediately suppressed.

=== Legal and political rights ===
- That their laws should be preserved as they were before and that no one should judge them except by those same laws.
- That no Christian or Jew holding public offices by the appointment of the late Sultan should be allowed to exercise his functions or rule over them.
- That no one should be prosecuted and punished for the crime of another man.
- That no Muslim should be prosecuted for the death of a Christian slain during the siege and that no restitution of property taken during the war should be enforced.
- That no Muslim should be subject to have Christian soldiers billeted upon him or be transported to provinces of this kingdom against his will.

=== Personal security and property rights ===
- That both great and small should be perfectly secure in their persons, families and properties.
- That they should be allowed to continue in their dwellings and residences, whether in the city, the suburbs or any other part of the country.
- That no Christian should be allowed to peep over the wall or into the house of a Muslim or enter a mosque.
- That any Muslim choosing to travel or reside among the Christians should be perfectly secure in his person and property.

=== Social protections ===
- That no Christian should enter the house of a Muslim or insult him in any way.
- That no badge or distinctive mark be put upon them, as was done with the Jews and Mudejares.

=== Slavery and war related terms ===
- That all Muslim captives taken during the siege of Granada, from whatever part of the country they might have come, but especially the nobles and chiefs mentioned in the agreement should be liberated.
- That such Muslim captives as might have escaped from their Christian masters and taken refuge in Granada should not be surrendered, but the Sultan should be bound to pay the price of such captives to their owners.

=== Migration rights ===
- That all those who might choose to cross over to Africa should be allowed to take their departure within a certain time and be conveyed thither in the king's ships, and without any pecuniary tax being imposed on them beyond the mere charge for passage, and that after the expiration of that time no Muslim should be hindered from departing provided he paid, in addition to the price of his passage, the tithe of whatever property he might carry along with him.

=== Additional provision ===
- That the Lord of Rome, the Pope, should be requested to give his assent to the above conditions and sign the treaty himself. [This request by the Moorish side was not carried out.]

== Implementation and breakdown ==
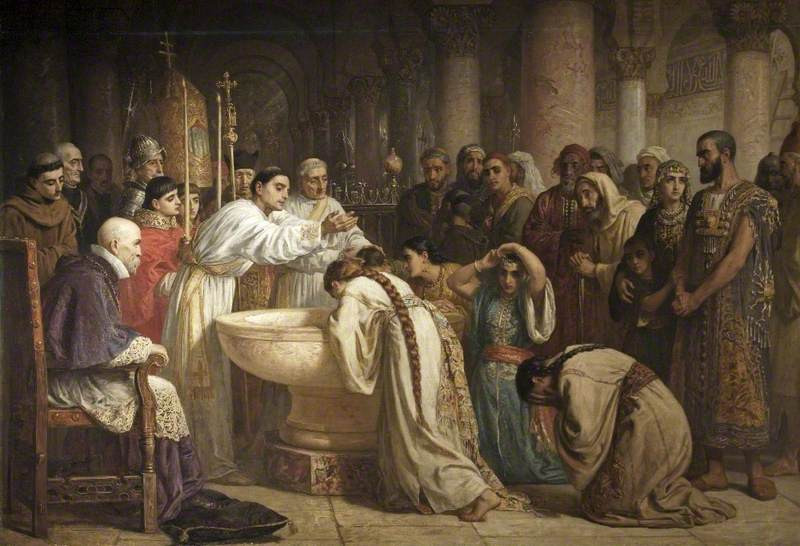
Forced conversions under Francisco Jiménez de Cisneros were seen as violations of the treaty and the main reason for the later rebellions by the Muslim population. The Moorish Proselytes of Archbishop Ximenes, Granada, 1500 by Edwin Long, 1873

Initially, the Catholic conquerors implemented and reinforced the terms of the treaty. A joint municipal council was established in Granada, and the Muslims were allowed to elect their own representatives. Despite pressure from the Spanish clergy, Ferdinand chose a laissez-faire policy toward the Muslims, hoping interaction with Catholics would make them "understand the error" of their faith and abandon it. Hernando de Talavera, a friar of converso origins known for his moderation and piety, was appointed as the archbishop of Granada. He was known for his preference for preaching based on "Catholic reasoning", as opposed to "punishments and lashes". When Ferdinand and Isabella visited the city in the summer of 1499, they were greeted by an enthusiastic crowd, including Muslims.^{[1]}

At the same time, Cardinal Francisco Jiménez de Cisneros, the archbishop of Toledo, arrived in Granada and began working alongside Talavera. Cisneros disliked Talavera's approach and began sending uncooperative Muslims, especially the noblemen, to prison, where they were treated harshly until they agreed to convert. Emboldened by the increase in conversions, Cisneros intensified the efforts, and on December 1499, he told Pope Alexander VI that three thousand Muslims converted in a single day. Cisneros's own church council warned that these methods might be a breach of the Treaty. The 16th-century hagiographer Álvar Gómez de Castro described the approach as "methods that were not correct".

In December 1499, amid the increasingly forced conversions and triggered by an incident involving an attempt by the authorities to reconvert a Muslim woman who had converted from Christianity, the population of Albayzín, the Muslim quarter of Granada, began an open and armed revolt. Talavera and Captain-General Tendilla resolved the situation by negotiating with the Muslims. Meanwhile, Cisneros was summoned to the court in Seville to account for his actions. He convinced the Catholic monarchs to issue a collective pardon to the rebels on the condition that they converted to Christianity. Consequently, the whole city of Granada nominally became Christian, and the treaty began to unravel.

== Historical legacy and impact ==
The Treaty of Granada was not just the end of a war; it was the catalyst for a fundamental shift in world history. Its significance can be measured in three major ways:

=== The blueprint for the "nation-state" ===
Before 1492, Spain was a collection of diverse kingdoms with different laws and religions. The Treaty of Granada (and its subsequent violation) marked the moment Spain decided to become a unified nation-state with one religion (Catholicism) and one primary authority. This "Granada Model" where a state demands total cultural and religious uniformity from its citizens became the standard for European empires for the next several centuries.

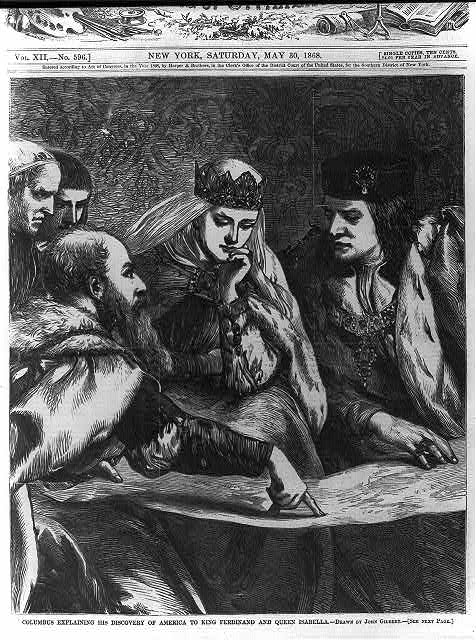
Columbus explaining his discovery to King Ferdinand and Queen Isabella.

=== The bridge to the Americas ===
The fall of Granada and the signing of the treaty were the final hurdles for the Spanish Crown's global ambitions.

- Financial Resources: With the expensive 10-year war over, Ferdinand and Isabella could finally afford to fund Christopher Columbus.
- Administrative Testing: The Spanish used Granada as a "laboratory" for colonization. The methods they used to govern the conquered Moors, such as building churches over mosques and appointing royal overseers were the exact same methods they applied to the Indigenous populations in the New World just decades later.

=== The death of coexistence ===
For centuries, the Iberian Peninsula was defined by a period of coexistence, in which Muslims, Christians, and Jews lived in relatively close proximity, sharing scientific, medical, and philosophical knowledge. The Treaty of Granada was the final, flickering light of this era. By failing to uphold the treaty's promises of tolerance, the Spanish Crown signaled that the era of pluralism was over, replaced by the era of the Inquisition and religious "purity".

=== A turning point in the Mediterranean power balance ===
The treaty effectively removed the last Islamic "stronghold" in Western Europe. This shifted the focus of the conflict between Christian Europe and the Islamic world (specifically the Ottoman Empire) further east. It secured the Western Mediterranean for the Spanish and Portuguese, allowing them to turn their attention away from domestic defense and toward global expansion in African, Asia, and the Americas.

== See also ==
- List of treaties
- Reconquista
- Morisco Revolt
- Timeline of the Muslim presence in the Iberian Peninsula
