= Laujar de Andarax =

Laujar de Andarax, Spain
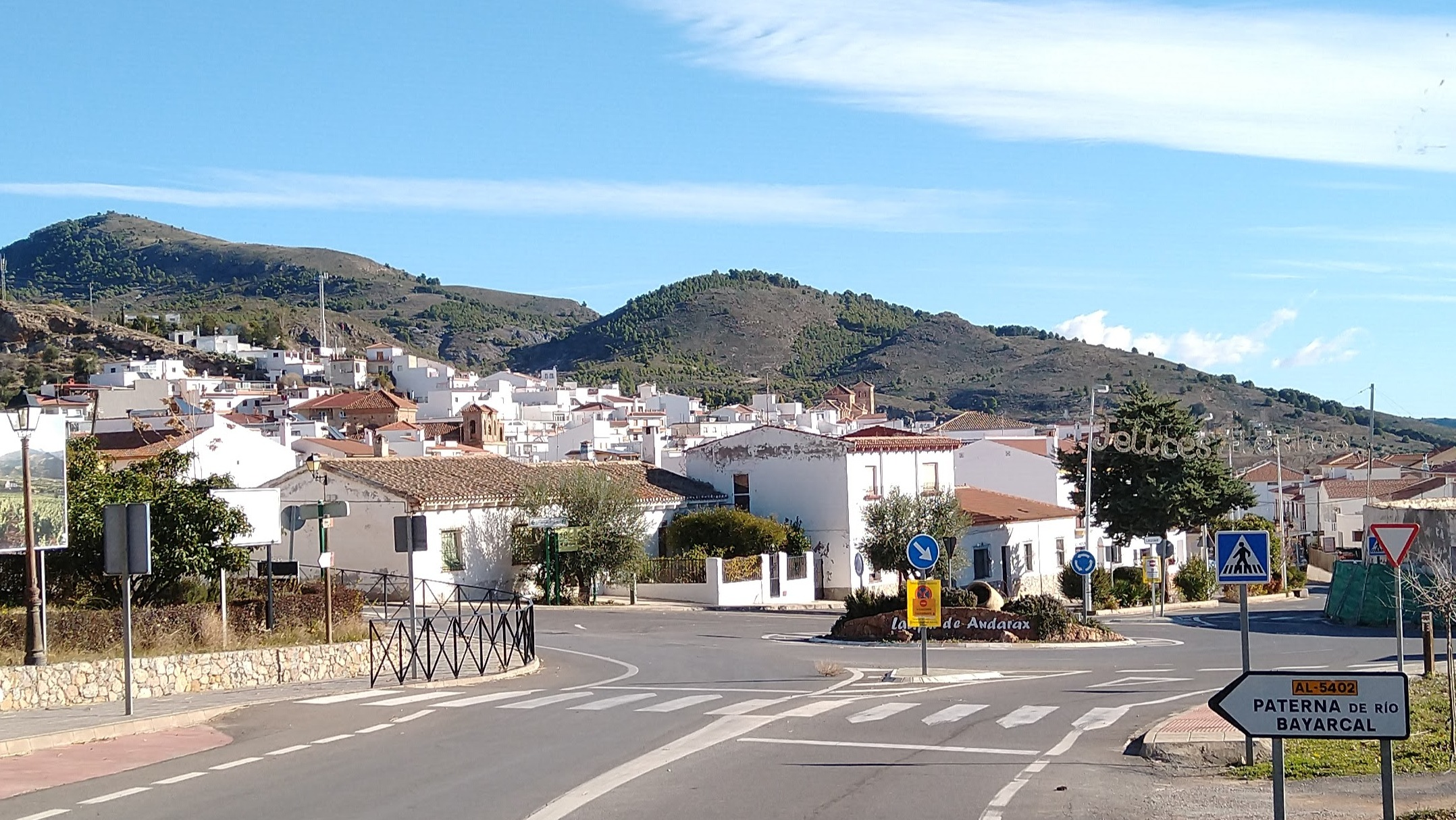

- Flag Coat of arms
- Interactive map of Laujar de Andarax, Spain
- Coordinates: 36°59′N 2°53′W
- Country: Spain
- Community: Andalusia
- Municipality: Almería

Government
  - Mayor: Emilio Romero (PSA)

Area
  - Total: 92 km^{2} (36 sq mi)
- Elevation: 918 m (3,012 ft)

Population (2025-01-01)
  - Total: 1,674
  - Density: 18/km^{2} (47/sq mi)
- Time zone: UTC+1 (CET)
  - Summer (DST): UTC+2 (CEST)

Laujar de Andarax is a municipality of Almería province, in the autonomous community of Andalusia, Spain.

== History ==
The people of Laujar de Andarax took part in the rebellion of the Alpujarras in 1500, triggered by the forced conversion of its Muslim population to Christianity. It was the scene of one of the most violent episodes during the suppression of the rebellion. Two hundred Muslims who had taken refuge in a local mosque were blown up with gunpowder under the order of Louis de Beaumont.

== Location and geography ==
Its surface area is 92 km^{2} and it has a density of 20.0 inhabitants / km^{2}. Its geographic coordinates are 36º 59 ', N, 2º 53', O. It is located in the Alpujarra of Almeria at an altitude of 918 meters and 69 kilometers from the provincial capital, Almería.

== Demographics ==
With a more than 1500 inhabitants, the town has the largest population of that region.

Historical population
Year	Pop.	±%
1999	1,855	—
2000	1,833	−1.2%
2001	1,808	−1.4%
2002	1,842	+1.9%
2003	1,827	−0.8%
2004	1,819	−0.4%
2005	1,836	+0.9%
Source: INE (Spain)

== Notable people ==
- Pedro Murillo Velarde y Bravo: jurist, geographer and missionary to the Philippines; was born in Laujar in 1696.
- Francisco Villaespesa Martín: modernist poet born in Laujar in 1877.
- Florentino Castañeda y Muñoz: historian born in Laujar in 1905.

== See also ==
- List of municipalities in Almería
