= Granada War =

Final war of the Reconquista

- Part of the Reconquista
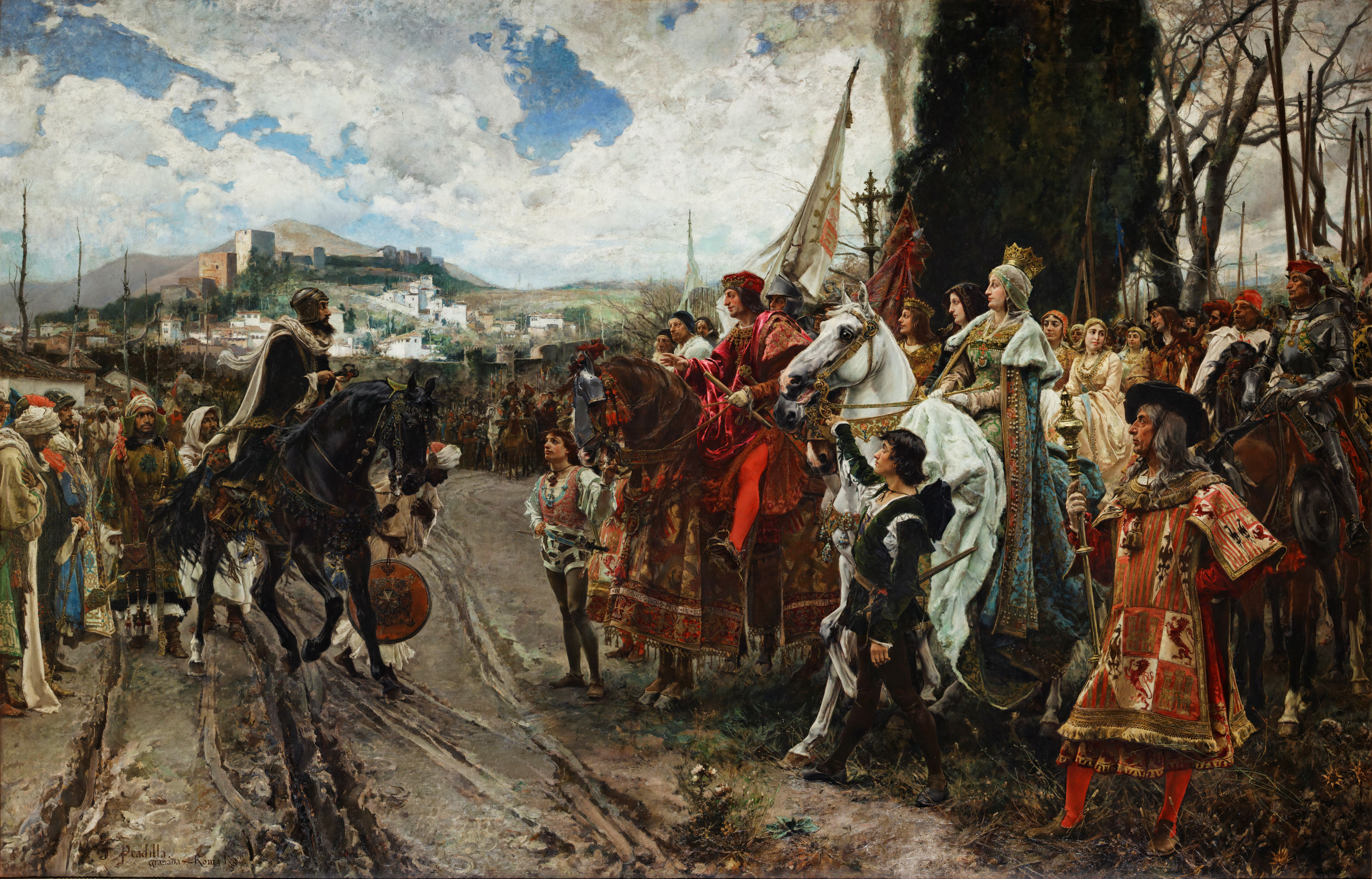
- The Surrender of Granada by Francisco Pradilla Ortiz: Muhammad XI surrenders to Ferdinand II and Isabella I.
Date	February 1482 – 2 January 1492
Location	Southeastern Iberia
Result	Castilian–Aragonese victory
Territorial changes	Granada annexed to Castile

Belligerents
Crown of Castile and Crown of Aragon	Emirate of Granada

Commanders and leaders
Ferdinand II of Aragon; Isabella I of Castile	Abu'l-Hasan Ali †; Muhammad XII †; Muhammad XI (surrendered)

Casualties and losses
Unknown	100,000 dead or enslaved (including civilians)

The Granada War was a series of military campaigns between 1482 and 1492 during the reign of the Catholic Monarchs, Isabella I of Castile and Ferdinand II of Aragon, against the Nasrid dynasty's Emirate of Granada. It ended with the defeat of Granada and its annexation by Castile, ending the last remnant of Islamic rule on the Iberian peninsula.

The ten-year war was not a continuous effort but a series of seasonal campaigns launched in spring and broken off in winter. The Granadans were crippled by internal conflict and civil war, while the Christians were generally unified. The Granadans were also bled economically by the tribute they had to pay Castile to avoid being attacked and conquered. The war saw the effective use of artillery by the Christians to rapidly conquer towns that would otherwise have required long sieges. On 2 January 1492, Muhammad XI of Granada (King Boabdil) surrendered the Emirate of Granada, the city of Granada, and the Alhambra palace to the Castilian forces.

The war was a joint project between Isabella's Crown of Castile and Ferdinand's Crown of Aragon. The bulk of the troops and funds for the war came from Castile, and Granada was annexed into Castile's territory. The Crown of Aragon was less important: apart from the presence of King Ferdinand himself, Aragon provided naval collaboration, guns, and some financial loans. Aristocrats were offered the allure of new lands, while Ferdinand and Isabella centralized and consolidated their power.

The aftermath of war brought to an end coexistence between religions in the Iberian peninsula: Jews were forced to convert to Christianity or be exiled in 1492, and by 1501, all of Granada's Muslims were obliged to convert to Christianity, become slaves, or be exiled; by 1526 this prohibition spread to the rest of Spain. "New Christians" (conversos) came to be accused of crypto-Islam and crypto-Judaism. Spain would go on to model its national aspirations as the guardian of Christianity and Catholicism. The fall of the Alhambra is still celebrated every year by the City Council of Granada, and the Granada War is considered in traditional Spanish historiography as the final war of the Reconquista.

== Iberia and Al-Andalus in the late 15th century ==
The Emirate of Granada had been the last Muslim state in Iberia for more than two centuries by the time of the Granada War. The other remnant al-Andalus states (the taifas) of the once powerful Caliphate of Córdoba had long since been conquered by the Christians. Pessimism for Granada's future existed before its ultimate fall; in 1400, Ibn Hudayl wrote "Is Granada not enclosed between a violent sea and an enemy terrible in arms, both of which press on its people day and night?" Still, Granada was wealthy and powerful, and the Christian kingdoms were divided and fought amongst themselves. Granada's problems began to worsen after Emir Yusuf III's death in 1417. Succession struggles ensured that Granada was in an almost constant low-level civil war. Clan loyalties were stronger than allegiance to the emir, making consolidation of power difficult. Often, the only territory the emir really controlled was the city of Granada. At times, the emir did not even control all the city, but rather one rival emir would control the Alhambra, and another the Albayzín, the most important district of Granada.

This internal fighting greatly weakened the state. The economy declined, with Granada's once preeminent porcelain manufacture disrupted and challenged by the Christian town of Manises near Valencia, in the Crown of Aragon. Despite the weakening economy, taxes were still imposed at their earlier high rates to support Granada's extensive defenses and large army. Ordinary Granadans paid triple the taxes of (non-tax-exempt) Castilians. The heavy taxes that Emir Abu-l-Hasan Ali imposed contributed greatly to his unpopularity. These taxes did at least support a respected army; Hasan was successful in putting down Christian revolts in his lands, and some observers estimated he could muster as many as 7,000 horsemen.

The frontier between Granada and the Castilian lands of Andalusia was in a constant state of flux, "neither in peace nor in war." Raids across the border were common, as were intermixing alliances between local nobles on both sides of the frontier. Relations were governed by occasional truces and demands for tribute should those on one side have been seen to overstep their bounds. Neither country's central government intervened or controlled the warfare much.

King Henry IV of Castile died in December 1474, setting off the War of the Castilian Succession between Henry's daughter Joanna la Beltraneja and Henry's half-sister Isabella. The war raged from 1475 to 1479, pitting Isabella's supporters and the Crown of Aragon against Joanna's supporters, Portugal, and France. During this time, the frontier with Granada was practically ignored; the Castilians did not even bother to ask for or obtain reparation for a raid in 1477. Truces were agreed upon in 1475, 1476, and 1478. In 1479, the Succession War concluded with Isabella victorious. As Isabella had married Ferdinand of Aragon in 1469, this meant that the two powerful kingdoms of Castile and Aragon would stand united, free from the inter-Christian strife which had allowed the Emirate of Granada to survive.

Maps of the Iberian peninsula and Granada in the 14th–15th centuries

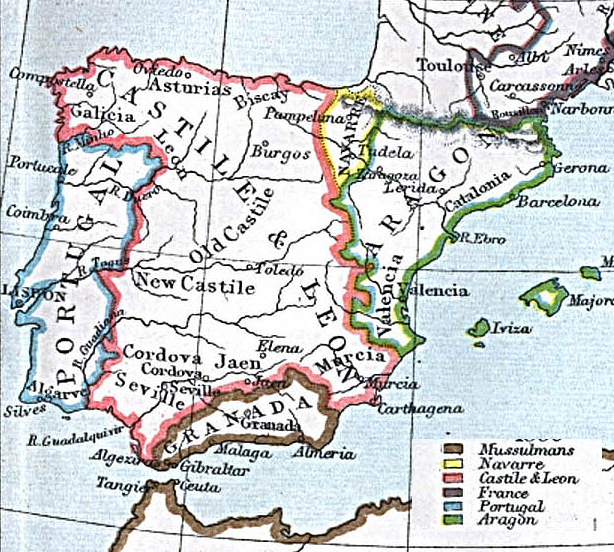
The five kingdoms of Iberia in 1360. The territory of the Emirate of Granada was reduced by 1482, as it lost its grasp on Gibraltar and other western territories.

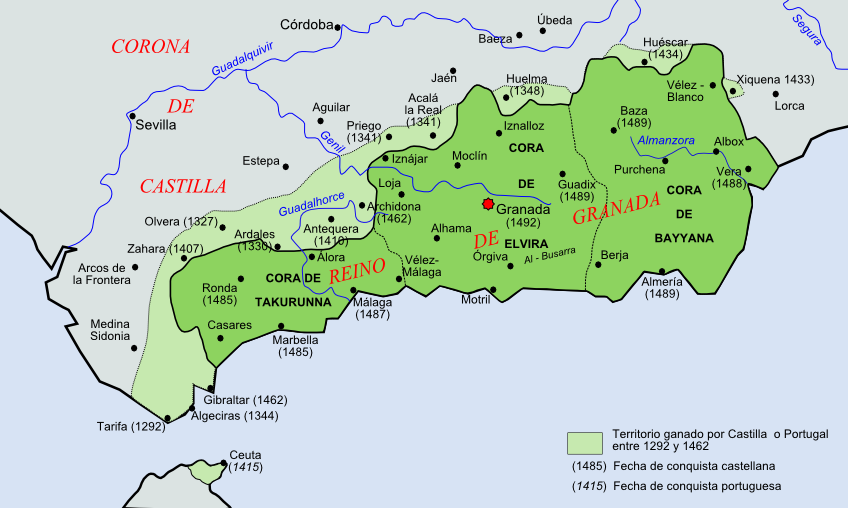
Territory of the Nasrid dynasty during the 15th century. In light green are territories conquered by the Christian kings during the 13th century, including Ceuta on the African coast.

== Chronology ==
=== Provocations and responses ===
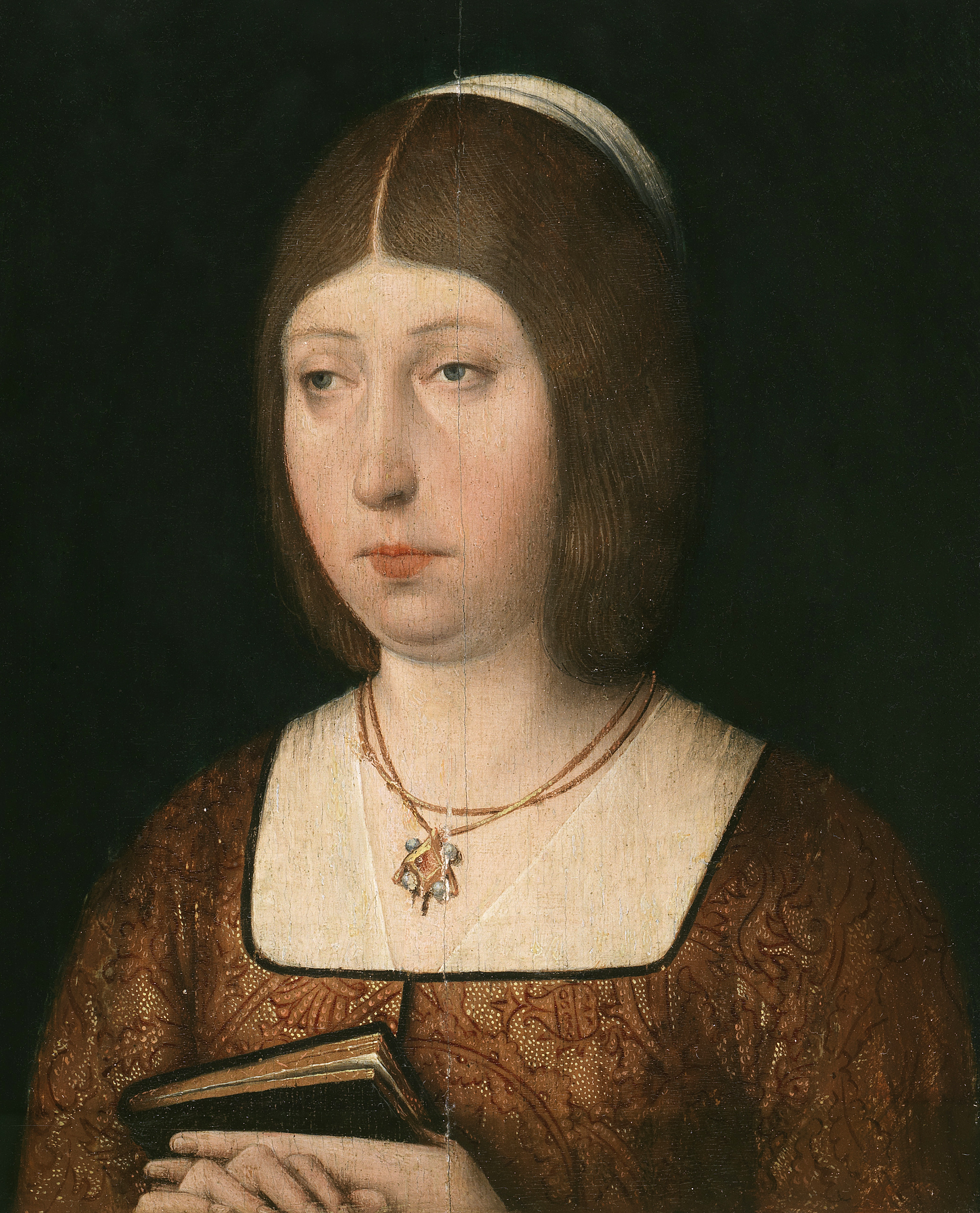
Queen Isabella's marriage with Ferdinand of Aragon ensured a united front of Castile and Aragon against Granada.

The truce of 1478 was still theoretically in effect when Granada launched a surprise attack against Zahara on 26 December 1481, as part of a reprisal for a Christian raid. The town fell, and the population was enslaved. This attack proved to be a great provocation, and factions in favor of war in Andalusia used it to rally support for a counterstrike, quickly moving to take credit for it, and backed a wider war. The seizure of Alhama and its subsequent royal endorsement is usually said to be the formal beginning of the Granada War. Abu Hasan attempted to retake Alhama by siege in March but was unsuccessful. Reinforcements from the rest of Castile and Aragon averted the possibility of retaking Alhama on 28 April 1482. King Ferdinand formally took command at Alhama on 14 May 1482.

The Christians next tried to besiege Loja but failed to take the town. This setback was balanced by a twist that would prove to aid them greatly: on the same day that Loja was relieved, Abu Hasan's son, Abu Abdallah (also known as Boabdil), rebelled and styled himself Emir Muhammad XI. The war continued into 1483. Abu Hasan's brother, al-Zagal, defeated a large Christian raiding force in the hills of the Axarquia east of Málaga. However, at Lucena the Christians were able to defeat and capture King Boabdil. Ferdinand and Isabella had previously not been intent on conquering all of Granada. With the capture of King Boabdil, however, Ferdinand decided to use him to conquer Granada entirely. In a letter written in August 1483, Ferdinand wrote "To put Granada in division and destroy it We have decided to free him.... He [Boabdil] has to make war on his father." With Boabdil's release as a pseudo-Christian ally, the Granadan civil war continued. A Granadan chronicler commented that Boabdil's capture was "the cause of the fatherland's destruction."

In 1485, the fortunes of the Granadan internal conflict shifted yet again. Boabdil was expelled from the Albayzín, his base of power, by Hasan's brother al-Zagal. Al-Zagal also took command of the nation, dethroning his aging brother, who died shortly thereafter. Boabdil was obliged to flee to Ferdinand and Isabella's protection. The continuing division within the Muslim ranks and the cunning of the Marquis of Cádiz allowed the western reaches of Granada to be seized with unusual speed in 1485. Ronda fell to him after fifteen days, thanks to his negotiations with the city's leaders. Ronda's fall allowed Marbella, a base of the Granadan fleet, to come into Christian hands next.

Boabdil was soon released from Christian protection to resume his bid for control of Granada. For the next three years, he acted as one of Ferdinand and Isabella's vassals. He offered the promise of limited independence for Granada and peace with the Christians to the citizenry; from the Catholic Monarchs, he extracted the title of Duke for whatever cities he could control.

=== Siege of Málaga ===
Málaga, the chief seaport of Granada, was the main objective of the Castilian forces in 1487. Emir al-Zagal was slow to march to attempt to relieve the siege and was unable to harass the Christian armies safely because of the ongoing civil war; even after he left the city to come to the aid of Málaga, he was forced to leave troops in the Alhambra to defend against Boabdil and his followers.

The first main city to be attacked, Vélez-Málaga, capitulated on 27 April 1487, with local supporters of Boabdil directly aiding the Christian besiegers. Málaga held out during an extended siege that lasted from 7 May 1487 until 18 August 1487; its commander preferred death to surrender, and the African garrison and Christian renegades (converts to Islam) fought tenaciously, fearing the consequences of defeat. Near the end, the notables of Málaga finally offered a surrender, but Ferdinand refused, as generous terms had already been offered twice. When the city finally fell, Ferdinand punished almost all the inhabitants for their stubborn resistance with slavery, while renegades were burned alive or pierced by reeds. The Jews of Malaga, however, were spared, as Castilian Jews ransomed them from slavery.

Historian William Prescott considered the fall of Málaga the most important part of the war; Granada could not reasonably continue on as an independent state without Málaga, its chief port.

=== Siege of Baza ===
Al-Zagal lost prestige from the fall of Málaga, and Boabdil took over all of the city of Granada in 1487; he additionally controlled the northeast of the country with Vélez-Rubio, Vélez-Blanco, and Vera. Al-Zagal still controlled Baza, Guadix, and Almería. Boabdil took no action as the Christian forces took some of his land, perhaps assuming it would shortly be returned to him.

In 1489, the Christian forces began a painfully long siege of Baza, the most important stronghold remaining to al-Zagal. Baza was highly defensible as it required the Christians to split their armies, and artillery was of little use against it. Supplying the army caused a huge budget shortfall for the Castilians. Occasional threats of deprivation of office were necessary to keep the army in the field, and Isabella came personally to the siege to help maintain the morale of both the nobles and the soldiers. After six months, al-Zagal surrendered, despite his garrison still being largely unharmed; he had become convinced that the Christians were serious about maintaining the siege as long as it would take, and further resistance was useless without the hope of relief, of which there was no sign. Baza was granted generous surrender terms, unlike Málaga.

=== Last stand at Granada ===
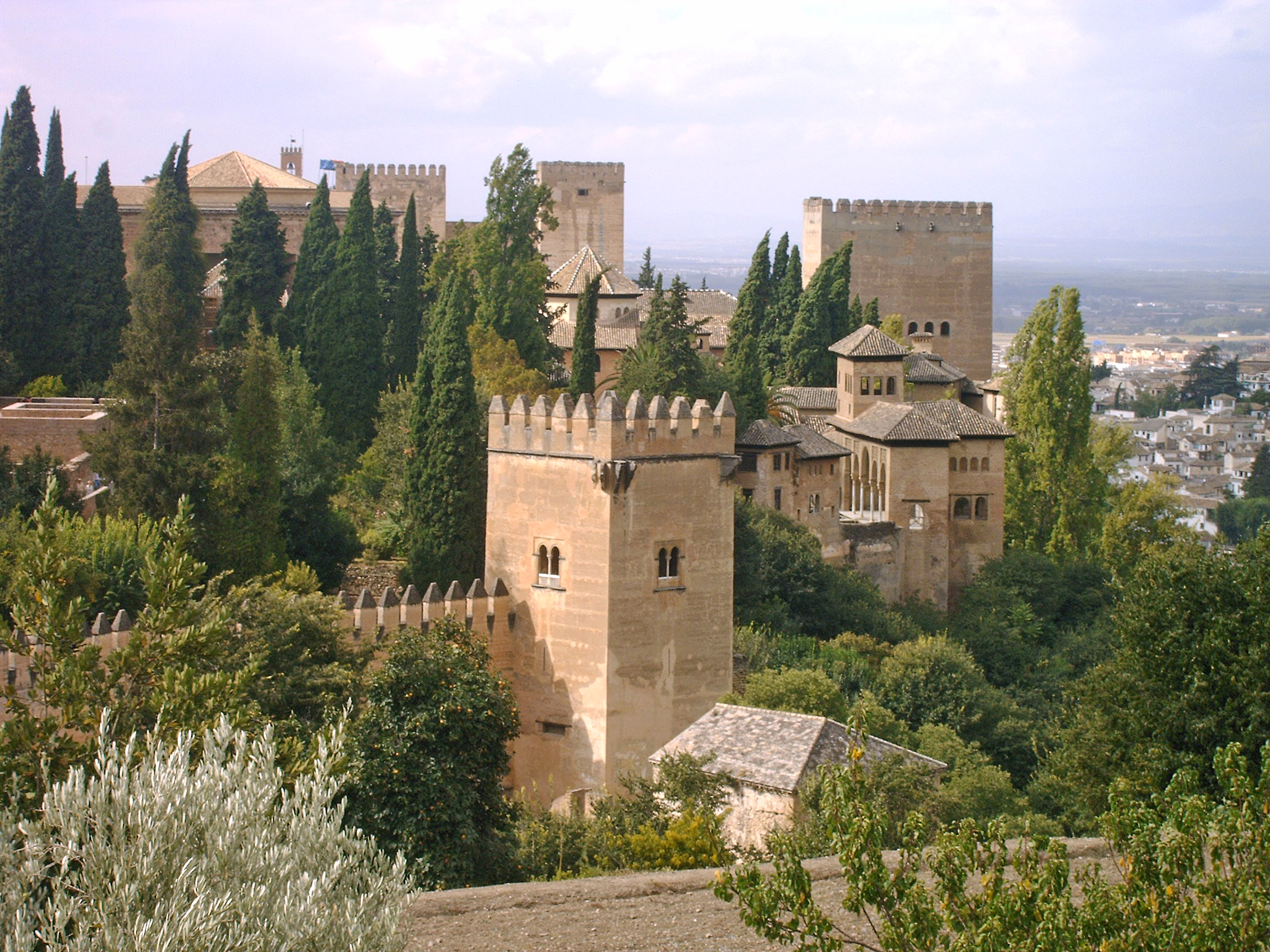
The Alhambra palace in southern Spain

With the fall of Baza and the capture of al-Zagal in 1490, it seemed as if the war was over; Ferdinand and Isabella believed this was the case. However, Boabdil was unhappy with the rewards for his alliance with Ferdinand and Isabella, possibly because lands that had been promised to him were being administered by Castile. He broke off his vassalage and rebelled against the Catholic Monarchs, despite holding only the city of Granada and the Alpujarras Mountains. It was clear that such a position was untenable in the long term, so Boabdil sent out desperate requests for external aid. Qaitbay, the Sultan of Egypt mildly rebuked Ferdinand for the Granada War, but the Mamluks that ruled Egypt were in a near constant war with the Ottoman Turks. As Castile and Aragon were fellow enemies of the Turks, the Sultan had no desire to break their alliance against the Turks. Boabdil also requested aid from the Sultanate of Fes, but no reply is recorded by history. North Africa continued to sell Castile wheat throughout the war and valued maintaining good trade relations. In any case, the Granadans no longer controlled any coastline from where to receive overseas aid. No help would be forthcoming for Granada.

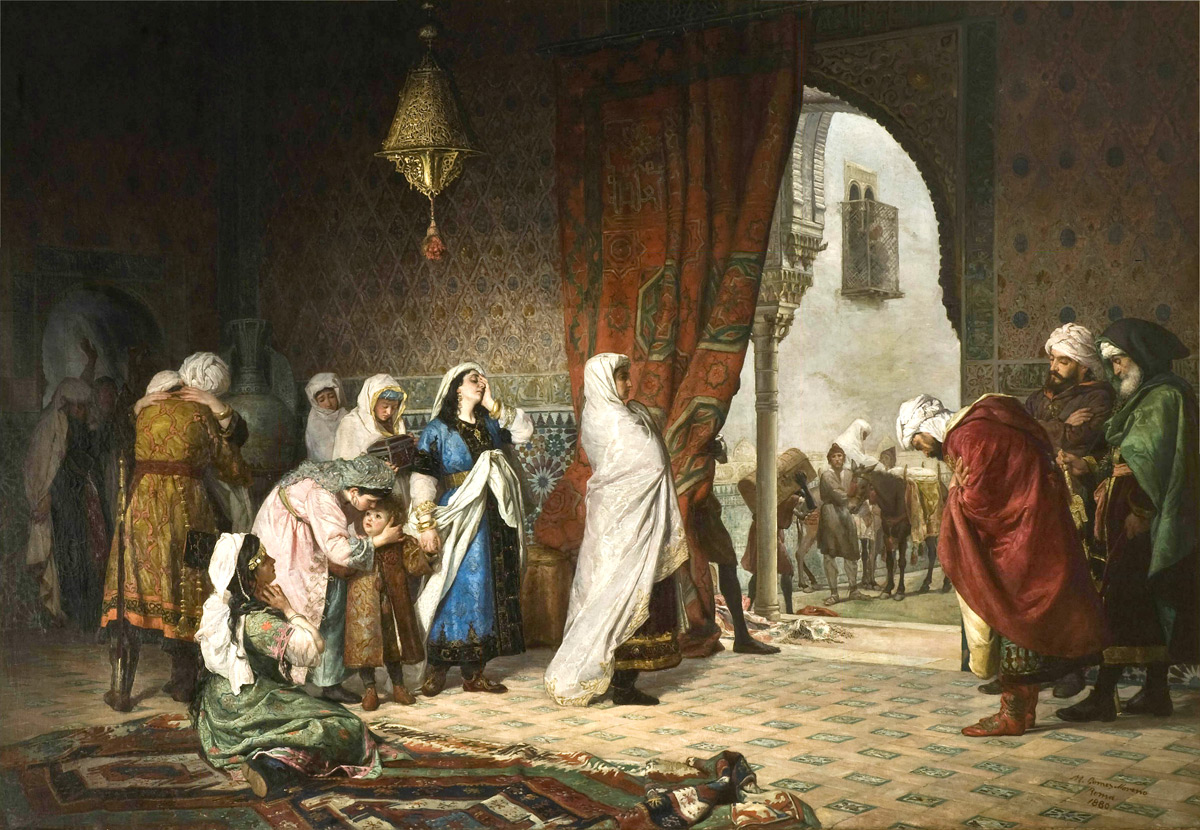
Painting depicting Muhammad XI's family in the Alhambra moments after the fall of Granada

An eight-month siege of Granada began in April 1491. The situation for the defenders grew progressively dire, as their forces for interfering with the siege dwindled and advisers schemed against each other. Bribery of important officials was rampant, and at least one of the chief advisers to Boabdil seems to have been working for Castile the entire time. After the Battle of Granada, a provisional surrender, the Treaty of Granada, was signed on November 25, 1491, which granted two months to the city. The reason for the long delay was not so much intransigence on either side, but rather the inability of the Granadan government to coordinate amongst itself in the midst of the disorder and tumult that gripped the city. After the terms, which proved rather generous to the local Muslim population, were negotiated, the city capitulated on January 2, 1492. The besieging Christians sneaked troops into the Alhambra that day in case resistance materialized, which it did not. Granada's resistance had come to its end.

== Tactics and technology ==
The most notable facet of the Granada War was the power of bombards and cannons to greatly shorten the many sieges of the war. The Castilians and Aragonese started the war with only a few artillery pieces, but Ferdinand had access to French and Burgundian experts from his recent wars, and the Christians aggressively increased their artillery forces. The Muslims, however, lagged far behind in their use of artillery, generally only using the occasional captured Christian piece. The historian Weston F. Cook Jr. wrote "Gunpowder firepower and artillery siege operations won the Granadan war, and other factors in the Spanish victory were actually secondary and derivative." By 1495, Castile and Aragon controlled 179 pieces of artillery total, a vast increase from the paltry numbers seen in the War of the Castilian Succession.

Primitive arquebuses also saw use in the war, though only to a small degree. Heavy cavalry knights were a much smaller factor in the Granada War than seen in earlier warfare. Light cavalry jinetes took on a more prominent role instead. The open-field battles in which cavalry were the most important were rare; the Granadans, badly outnumbered, generally avoided such battles. The Castilians also employed a large number of supporting men; a huge force of workers were mustered in 1483 to destroy crops and pillage the countryside rather than engage directly in battle. Coordination and logistics were difficult given the mountainous terrain, but the Christians diligently built a series of roads through the mountains to deliver food and supplies to their troops.

Politically, many nobles insisted on controlling their own forces, but Ferdinand and Isabella were still able to exercise a large degree of control in directing the army as a whole. The Granadans, meanwhile, were beset with civil war, preventing the establishment of a unified command. The Christian army was almost completely Castilian; Aragonese and foreign mercenary participation was minimal. Of the Castilian army, Andalusia contributed far more troops than the other territories, with much of its population conscripted into the war. The nobility provided the majority of the expensive cavalry.

== Strengths of the armies involved ==
Concerning the real strength of the armies involved, according to original sources the Castilian armies reached between 50,000 and 70,000 soldiers the years of the greatest military effort (1482, 1483, 1486, 1487, 1489 and 1491), or 10,000 to 29,000 in the quieter ones (1484, 1485, 1488, and 1490), strength which is accepted by modern scholars such as Ladero Quesada. Nevertheless, according to García de Gabiola, to keep, pay and feed armies of such strength was beyond the resources of the recently created modern states. For the campaigns in Italy (1494–1503) the Spanish armies were of 5,000, 9,000 or 15,000 men maximum, so it is rather surprising the numbers recorded 5–10 years before for Granada. Taking into account the revenues of Castile during the period (130 to some 200 million maravedies per year) it is hardly plausible that Castile could have organized more than 8,000 to 20,000 soldiers. In fact, Ladero Quesada register the number of grain loads contracted by Castile in several years and García de Gabiola has calculated the number of soldiers that could have been fed through these grain loads, and his conclusions are 12,000 men for 1482 (siege of Loja); 8,000 men for 1483 and 1484 (Granada fields sacking); 10,000 men in 1485 (Ronda siege); 10–12,000 soldiers in 1486 (second Loja siege); 12,000 for 1487 (Malaga siege); 10–12,000 in 1488 (first Baza siege); 20,000 soldiers in 1489 (second Baza siege, the greatest grain loads contracted, that also coincides with the largest revenue of Castile during the campaign, some 200 million); and 10–12,000 men for 1490–91 (final siege of Granada). A 20% of them should be cavalry.

In relation to Muslim armies, according to Gabiola, the strengths mentioned by the sources (15,000 to 50,000 infantry, or 4,500–7,000 cavalry) should also be discarded. More plausible strengths mentioned are the 3,000 horses (1482), 1,000 to 1,500 (1483, 1485 and 1487) or even 3–400 riders (1489 and 1491). Concerning the infantry, De Miguel Mora states that a Muslim soldier captured by the Castilians during the siege of Baza confessed that the real infantry strength of the garrison was 4,000 men and not 15,000. So, the Muslim armies could not exceed some 4,000 infantry. At the end of the war, the ratio was 2-to-1 or 3-to-1 in favor of the Castilian armies.

The Granada War proved to be valuable training for the Italian Wars, where the Castilian armies and tactics such as the tercio would acquit themselves well.

== Consequences ==
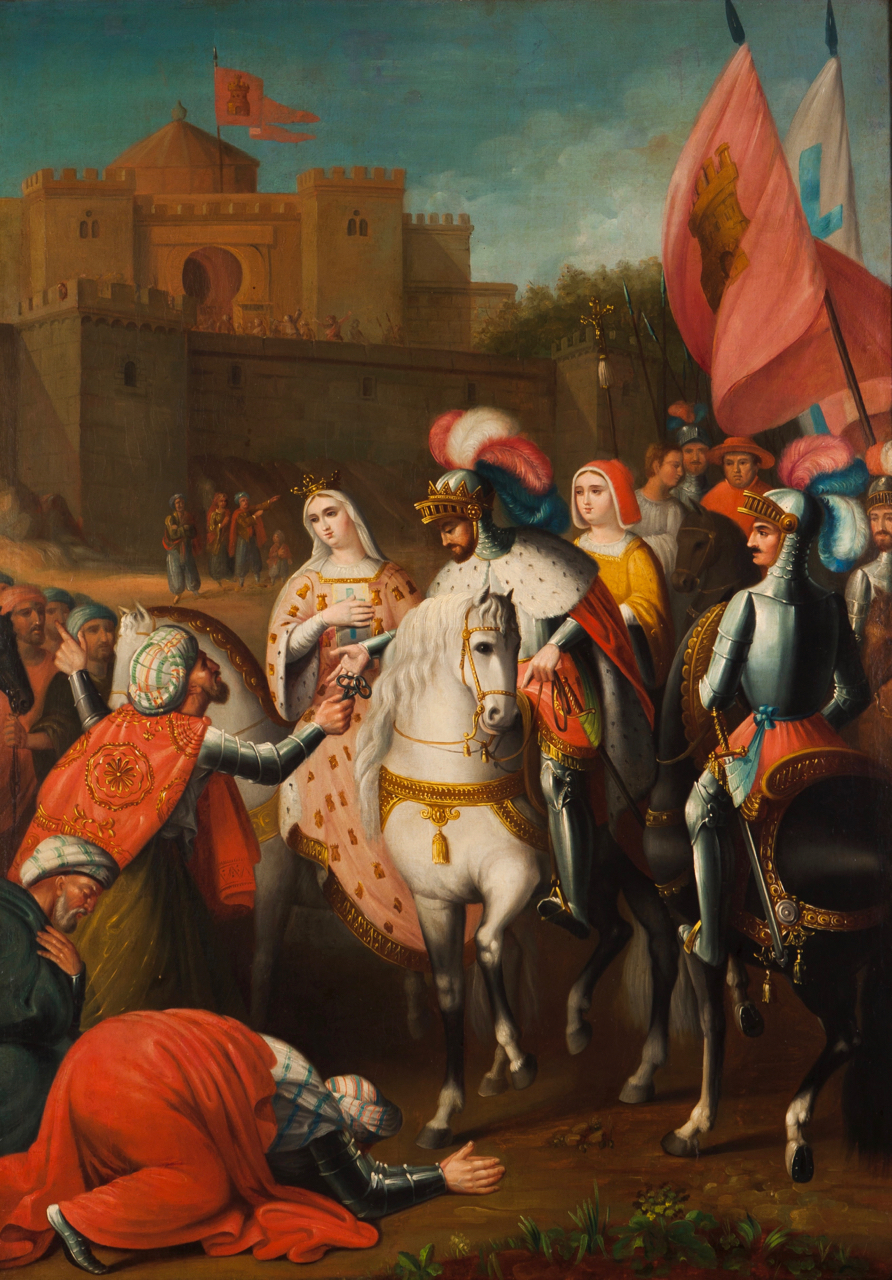
The Surrender of Granada, by Vicente Barneto y Vazquez

The surrender of Granada was seen as a great blow to Islam and a triumph of Christianity. Other Christian states offered their sincere congratulations to Ferdinand and Isabella, while Islamic writers reacted with despair. In Castile and Aragon, celebrations and bullfights were held. People rejoiced in the streets. For Christendom, the wresting of Granada from Islamic rule was seen as a counterbalance to the loss of Constantinople at the hands of the Ottoman Turks forty years prior.

The treaty's terms for Granada's surrender were quite generous to the Muslims, considering how little they had left to bargain with. They were similar to the terms offered to towns which surrendered earlier, when the outcome of the war was in doubt. For three years, Muslims could emigrate and return freely. They were allowed to keep weapons, though not firearms, a provision that however was to be annulled a month later. No one would be forced to change religion, not even former Christians who had converted to Islam. Boabdil was offered money and the rulership of a small principality in the mountainous Alpujarras, an area that would have been difficult to control in any case. At first, most of conquered Granada was treated respectfully and was therefore predominantly stable for seven years, though the Alhambra Decree of 1492 expelled the Jews that were not converso Marranos.

King Boabdil soon found his position intolerable. He left for Morocco in October 1493, where he would die some forty years later. Eventually, Castile started to revoke some of the more tolerant attributes of the treaty. This initiative was led by Archbishop Cisneros, who ordered mass conversions, the burning of valuable Arabic manuscripts and other measures detrimental to the Muslims (and Jews).

This sparked a revolt that ended in many Muslims being forced to choose between baptism, exile, or execution. Tensions from then onward would remain high, and Castile was obliged to maintain a large military force in Granada to deter future revolts. Isabella also strengthened the Spanish Inquisition, and Ferdinand brought the Inquisition to Aragon where previously it had not held power.

Castile was the main beneficiary of the war, as it had also spent by far the majority of the money and manpower to prosecute it, and completely annexed Granada. The conquest of Granada meant little for Aragon's strategic position, but it did help secure Castilian support in Italy and France, where Aragon's interests lay. The task of funding the war was formidable; the total cost was estimated to be 450,000,000 maravedies.

Increasing oppression of the Moors—now known as Moriscos or "New Christians"—led to the Rebellion of the Alpujarras (1568–71). After the defeat of the Moors, which was not easy, almost all the Moriscos of the former Kingdom of Granada were exiled to other parts of Spain.

== Cultural influence ==
An entire genre, romances fronterizos, developed around stories of the war and the battles on the Granadan frontier which reached their culmination in Granada's fall. Ginés Pérez de Hita wrote an early example of historical fiction, Guerras civiles de Granada, a romantic account of the war that emphasized chivalry and heroism on both sides. A number of stories and songs appear to have been sponsored by the royal government to help steel morale for the long struggle; Sobre Baza was a poem written in 1479 encouraging persistence in the long siege. The song "Setenil, ay Setenil", written in 1484, hoped that Ferdinand would conquer "as far as Jerusalem." The song "Una sañosa porfía" by Juan del Encina puts the depiction of the war in the lips of King Boabdil himself.

Spanish Baroque playwright Calderon de la Barca wrote a play concerning the Conquest of Granada entitled Amar despues de la Muerte. It was translated as Love After Death in 1853 by Denis Florence McCarthy, and again by Roy Campbell in 1959 (see List of Calderón's plays in English translation). English playwright John Dryden wrote a heroic drama The Conquest of Granada, published in 1672, which focuses on a romantic love triangle and clashing loyalties in two feuding Granadan factions, leaving the besieging Castilians in the background.

=== Día de la Toma ===
The Día de la Toma de Granada is a civic and religious festival held each year in Granada on the anniversary of the city's conquest, January 2. In the 21st century, parties of the left have criticised and boycotted the date, instead proposing that Granada's festival be that of Mariana Pineda, a 19th-century heroine. In 2019 and 2020, the party PP celebrated the event, also attended by Vox and the group Hogar Social, distributing Spanish flags, with attendees chanting in praise of Spanish identity, while other groups such as the Revolutionary Anticapitalist Left turned out to oppose the celebration altogether, labelling the conquest a genocide. During the celebration, the Spanish Legion marches with its music band; it has become a rallying point for far-right and nationalist groups that have sparked incidents in late years. The Spanish Socialists shifted their position from removing the celebration to adding also Moor parading as a sign of "cultural encounter".

== See also ==
- Timeline of the Muslim presence in the Iberian peninsula § Castile-Aragón conquers the kingdom of Granada (1481–1491)
- Islam in Spain
- Morisco Rebellions in Granada
- Border of Granada

== Bibliography ==
- Benito Ruano, Eloy (1974). "Un cruzado inglés en la Guerra de Granada". Anuario de Estudios Medievales (9): 585–594. ISSN 0066-5061.
- Delgado, Cristóbal Torres (1997). El Reino Nazarí de Granada (1482 - 1492): Muerte y Resurrección?. Granada: Albaida. ISBN 978-84-86521-38-7.
- de Miguel Mora, Carlos (2000). "La toma de Baza: estrategia militar y política internacional" (PDF). In González Alcantud, José Antonio; Barrios Aguilera, Manuel (eds.). Las tomas: antropología histórica de la ocupación territorial del Reino de Granada. Biblioteca de etnología. Granada: Diputación provincial de Granada. ISBN 978-84-7807-273-6. Archived from the original (PDF) on April 13, 2018.
- García de Gabiola, Javier (2015). "La guerra que puso fin al medievo, Granada (1482-1492)". Arqueología, historia y viajes sobre el mundo medieval. No. 55. pp. 8–17. ISSN 1698-0387.
- Gabiola, Javier García de (2015). "Los ejércitos en la guerra de Granada (1482-1492): la génesis del estado moderno". Medievalia (in Spanish) (47): 34–42. doi:10.19130/medievalia.47.2015.305 (inactive 2 September 2025). ISSN 2448-8232.
- García de Gabiola, Javier (2008). "Todo empezó en Granada (1482-92)". Historia de Iberia Vieja. No. 116. pp. 40–41. ISSN 1699-7913.
- Hillgarth, Jocelyn N. (1978). The Spanish Kingdoms: 1250–1516. Volume II: 1410–1516, Castilian Hegemony. Oxford: Clarendon Press. ISBN 978-0-19-822531-7.
- Ladero Quesada, Miguel Angel (2001). La Guerra de Granada, 1482-1491. Granada: Sección de Publicaciones, Diputación de Granada. ISBN 978-84-7807-295-8.
- Ladero Quesada, Miguel Ángel (2005). La Hermandad de Castilla: Cuentas y Memoriales, 1480-1498. Madrid: Real Academia de la Historia. ISBN 978-84-95983-69-5.
- Prescott, William Hickling (1995). McJoynt, Albert D. (ed.). The Art of War in Spain: The Conquest of Granada, 1481-1492. London : Pennsylvania: Greenhill Books; Stackpole Books. ISBN 978-1-85367-193-7.
  - An extract from Prescott's 1838 book History of the Reign of Ferdinand and Isabella the Catholic, updated with modern scholarship and commentary.
