= The Sigh of the Moor =

Late 19th-century painting by Francisco Pradilla Ortiz

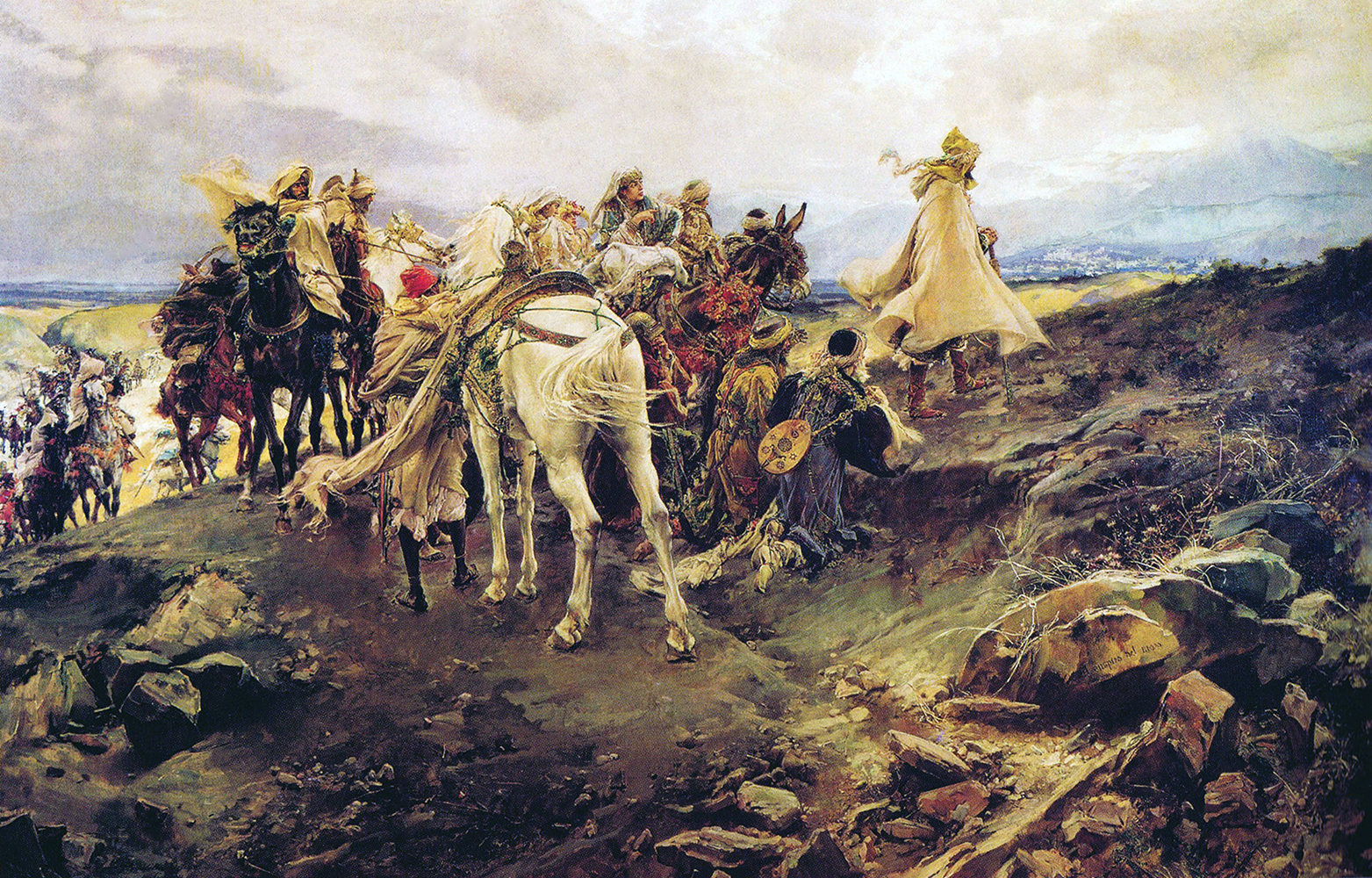
- Artist: Francisco Pradilla Ortiz
- Year: c.1878-1892
- Medium: Oil-on-canvas
- Movement: Orientalist
- Subject: Muhammad XI of Granada
- Dimensions: 1.95 m × 3.02 m (77 in × 119 in)
- Owner: Private collection

The Sigh of the Moor is an oil-on-canvas painting of Muhammad XI, (Boabdil), last Nasrid Emir of Granada. It was painted in the late 19th century by the Spanish artist Francisco Pradilla Ortiz. The painting depicts Boabdil, having ceded Granada to the Catholic Monarchs of Spain, Ferdinand and Isabella, turning to take a last look at the city he has lost, before going into exile.

== History ==
=== The picture ===
The painting depicts Muhammad XI, the last Nasrid ruler of Granada, turning to take his final look at the city from the Puerto del Suspiro del Moro before going into exile. (Note: The, possibly apocryphal, story has provided inspiration for a number of artists. Other examples include Peter F. Rothermel’s The Last Sigh of the Moor, held at the Pennsylvania Academy of the Fine Arts, and Les Adieux du roi Boabdil a Grenade by Alfred Dehodencq at the Musée d'Orsay.) Boabdil was upbraided by his mother, Aixa; “weep like a woman for the kingdom you could not defend like a man.” Historians have generally followed Aixa in condemning Boabdil, but a 21st-century revisionist view by Elizabeth Drayson, a historian at the University of Cambridge, sees him as; “a last stand against religious intolerance, fanatical power and cultural ignorance”. (Note: The site of Boabdil’s grave is a matter of dispute. Generally thought to have died and been buried in Fez in Morocco, another alternative is in Tlemcen, Algeria.) The writer Giles Tremlett, in his 2012 study, Ghosts of Spain, notes the traditional name for the road Boabdil took, "La Cuesta de Las Lágrimas - the Slope of Tears".

The Treaty of Granada, also known as the Capitulations, agreed in 1491 between Boabdil and Ferdinand and Isabella, was signed on 2 January 1492. The Alhambra had been surrendered to Ferdinand and Isabell's troops on the previous day. The treaty concluded the Granada War and brought to an end over 700 years of Muslim rule in Spain which had begun with the Umayyad conquest in 711.

=== The artist ===
Francisco Pradilla Ortiz (1848-1921) served brief terms as director, firstly of the Royal Academy of Spain in Rome and then at the Prado Museum, but worked primarily as a practising artist. Pradilla enjoyed great success in his career, his entry in the Museo Carmen Thyssen Málaga catalogue describing him as "one of the foremost Spanish painters of the last quarter of the 19th century [and] the last great master of history painting of the century." The Sigh of the Moor was begun at around the same time as Pradilla’s The Surrender of Granada, commissioned by the Spanish Senate, the upper house of the Cortes Generales, in 1879. However, Pradilla appears not to have completed it until around 1892. The picture was sold at auction in 2018 for €240.000, and remains privately owned. In 2021 the painting was declared an Asset of Cultural Interest (BIC).

== Description ==
The painting is oil-on-canvas and is 1.95m high and 3.02m wide. The focus of the image is the landscape around Granada, and it depicts Boabdil, dismounted and with a small band of followers behind him, staring back at the city from the mountain pass.

== Gallery ==
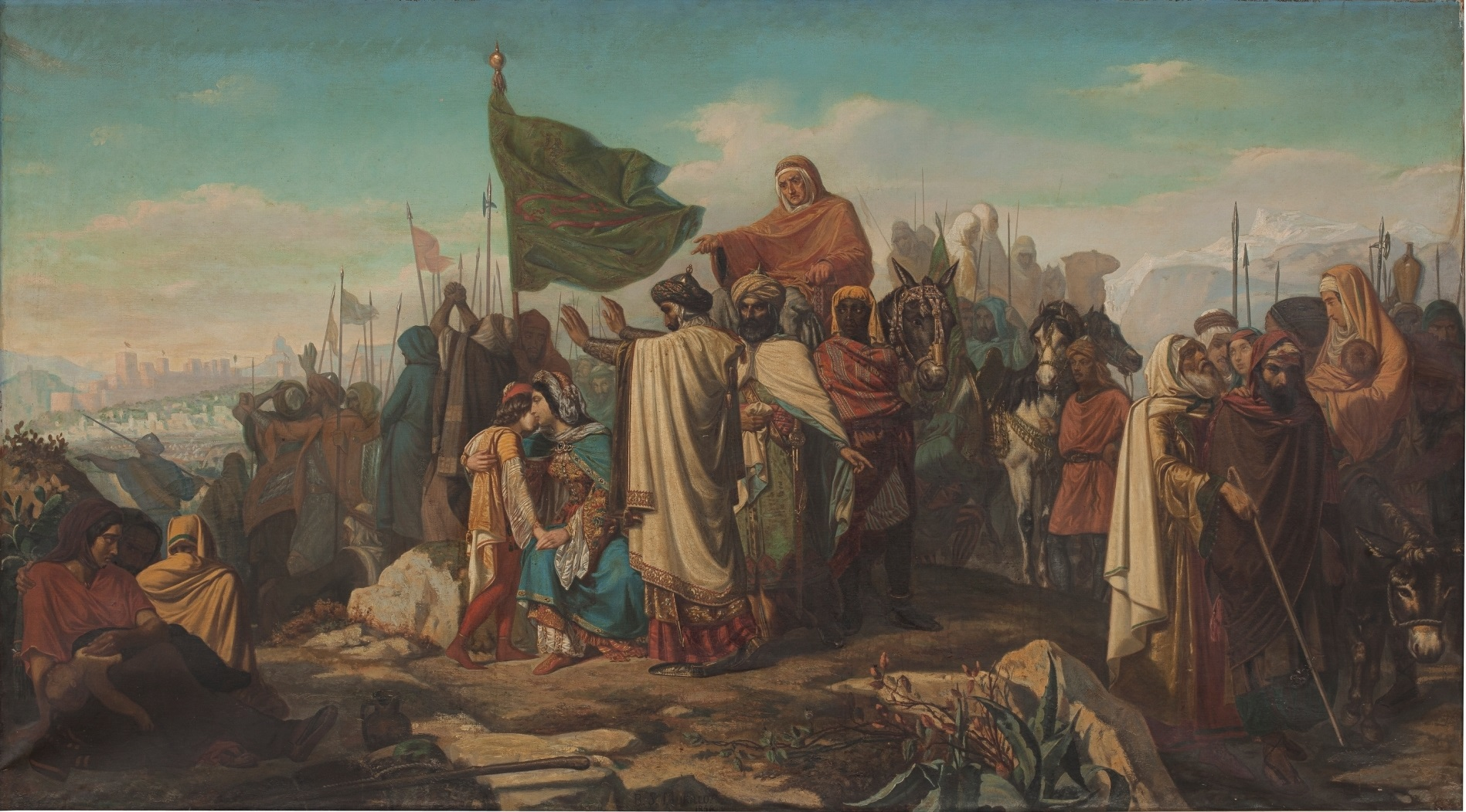
El Suspiro del Moro (1856), by Benito Soriano Murillo, Prado Museum

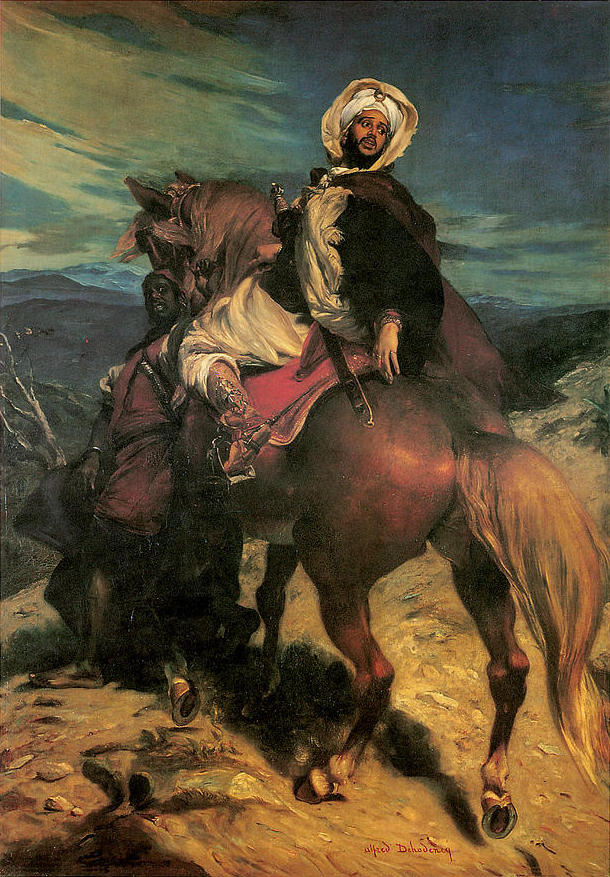
Boabdil's Farewell to Granada (1869), by Alfred Dehodencq, Musée d'Orsay

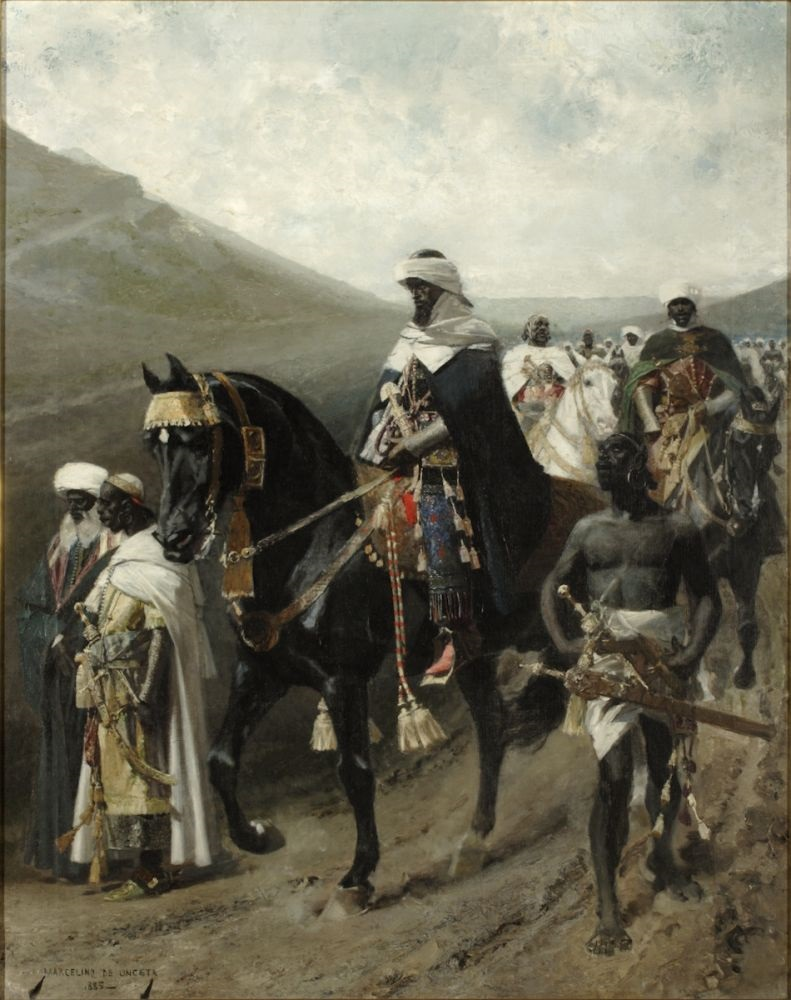
El Suspiro del Moro (1885), by Marcelino de Unceta, Zaragoza Museum

== See also ==
- Boabdil's Farewell to Granada - Alfred Dehodencq's 1869 study of the same subject

== Sources ==
- Drayson, Elizabeth (2019). The Moor's Last Stand: How Seven Centuries of Muslim Rule in Spain came to an End (PDF). London: Profile Books. ISBN 978-1-78125-6862.
- — (2021). Lost Paradise: The Story of Granada. London: Head of Zeus. ISBN 978-1-78854-7437.
- Fletcher, Richard (2001). Moorish Spain. London: Phoenix Press. ISBN 978-1-842-12605-9.
- Tremlett, Giles (2012). Ghosts of Spain. London: Faber and Faber. ISBN 978-0-571-27939-5.
