= Capital punishment in Islam =

Overview of the death penalty in Islam

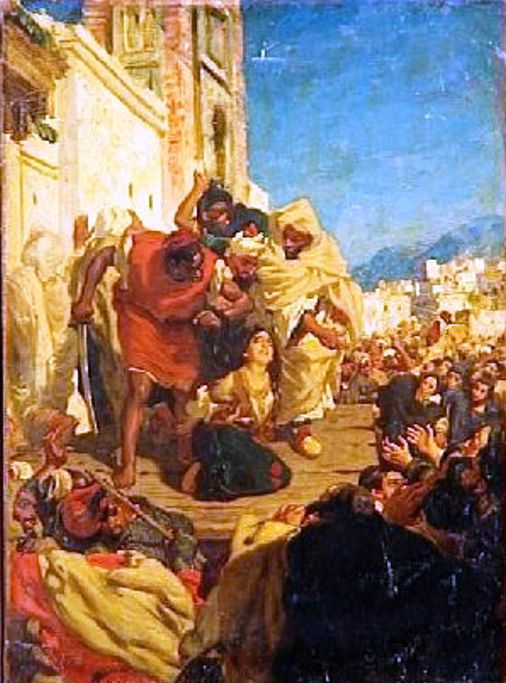
"Execution of a Moroccan Jewess (Sol Hachuel)" a painting by Alfred Dehodencq

Capital punishment in Islam is traditionally regulated by sharia, which is derived from the Quran and ahadith. Capital crimes in sharia are often interpreted to include murder, rape, adultery, and homosexual intercourse. Capital punishment is used in many Muslim-majority countries, where it is often seen as prescribed by sharia for crimes such as apostasy, adultery, witchcraft, murder, and rape.

== Capital crimes and sentencing ==
Both the hadiths and the Quran mention specific crimes for which capital punishment is a valid punishment. In the four primary schools of Sunni fiqh (Islamic jurisprudence) and the two primary schools of Shia fiqh, certain types of crimes mandate capital punishment.

=== Qisas ===
Qisas is a category of sentencing where sharia permits capital punishment, for intentional or unintentional murder. In the case of murder, sharia gives the victim's nearest relative or wali (ولي) a right to, if the court approves, take the life of the killer. Hudud crimes, which are those against God, are considered the most serious offences under sharia law, for which punishments are prescribed in the Quran. This includes banditry and adultery:

The punishment of those who wage war against Allah and His Messenger, and strive with might and main for mischief through the land is: execution, or crucifixion, or the cutting off of hands and feet from opposite sides, or exile from the land: that is their disgrace in this world, and a heavy punishment is theirs in the Hereafter, Except for those who return repenting before you apprehend them. And know that Allah is Forgiving and Merciful.

— Qur'an, Sura 5, ayat 33 & 34

Diyya is a payment to avoid trial for crimes such as murder. Concerns have been raised that poor offenders face trial and capital punishment while wealthy offenders avoid even a trial by paying off qisas compensation. The murder of Shahzeb Khan in 2012 brought particular attention to this issue in Pakistan.

=== Hudud ===
Certain hudud crimes are considered crimes against Allah and require capital punishment in public. These include apostasy (leaving Islam to become an atheist or convert to another religion), fasad (mischief in the land, or moral corruption against Allah, social disturbance and creating disorder within the Muslim state) and zina (consensual heterosexual or homosexual relations not allowed by Islam, specifically pre-marital or extramarital).

== Modern applications ==
Among the 57 member states of the Organization of Islamic Cooperation (OIC), the death penalty is actively practiced in 25 countries (44%). Another 11 countries (19%) theoretically allow capital punishment but have not carried out an execution in the past ten years (as of 2026). One country (2%) retains the death penalty only for wartime offenses, while 20 states (35%) have abolished it completely.

Muslim-majority nations carry out a large percentage of the world's executions. In the 2024 Amnesty International report for capital punishment, 1,474 (97.75%) of the 1,508 recorded executions occurred in Iran, Saudi Arabia, Iraq, Yemen, Somalia, Egypt, Kuwait, and Oman. However, this did not include data from China, where the number of executions is classified but believed to be over 1,000 per year alone. In several Islamic countries such as Sunni Saudi Arabia and Shia Iran, both hudud and qisas punishments are part of the legal system and in use.

== Methods ==
Lethal stoning and beheading in public under sharia is controversial for being a cruel form of capital punishment. These forms of execution remain part of the law enforced in Saudi Arabia, Yemen, Qatar, Iran and Mauritania. However stoning has not been implemented for many years.

Quotations regarding stoning can be seen in hadiths including the following:

'Ubada b. as-Samit reported: Allah's Messenger as saying: Receive teaching from me, receive teaching from me. Allah has ordained a way for those women. When an unmarried male commits adultery with an unmarried female, they should receive one hundred lashes and banishment for one year. And in case of married male committing adultery with a married female, they shall receive one hundred lashes and be stoned to death.

— Sahih Muslim, 17:4191

=== Decapitation in Islam ===
Decapitation was a standard method of execution in pre-modern Islamic law. The use of decapitation for punishment continued well into the 20th century in both Islamic and non-Islamic nations. When done properly, it was once considered a humane and honorable method of execution.

Use of decapitation was abandoned in most countries by the end of the 20th century. It is a legal method of execution in Saudi Arabia, Qatar, Yemen, and was reportedly used in 2001 in Iran according to Amnesty International, where it is no longer in use.

==== In Islamic scripture ====
There is a debate as to whether the Quran discusses decapitation. One surah could potentially be used to provide a justification for decapitation in the context of war:

Now when ye meet in battle those who disbelieve, then it is smiting of the necks until, when ye have routed them, making fast of bonds; and afterward either grace or ransom 'til the war lay down its burdens. (47:4)

Among classical commentators, Fakhr al-Din al-Razi interprets the last sentence of 8:12 to mean striking at the enemies in any way possible, from their head to the tips of their extremities. Al-Qurtubi reads the reference to striking at the necks as conveying the gravity and severity of the fighting. For al-Qurtubi, al-Tabari, and Ibn Kathir, the expression indicates the brevity of the act, as it is confined to battle and is not a continuous command.

Some commentators have suggested that Islamic terrorists use alternative interpretations of these surahs to justify beheading captives, however there is agreement among scholars that they have a different meaning. Furthermore, according to Rachel Saloom, surah 47:4 goes on to recommend generosity or ransom when waging war, and it refers to a period when Muslims were persecuted and had to fight for their survival.

==== Decapitation in Islamic law ====
Decapitation was the normal method of executing the death penalty under classical Islamic law. It was also, together with hanging, one of the ordinary methods of execution in the Ottoman Empire.

As of 2015, Saudi Arabia is the only country in the world which uses decapitation within its Islamic legal system. The majority of executions carried out by the Wahhabi government of Saudi Arabia are public beheadings, which usually cause mass gatherings but are not allowed to be photographed or filmed.

According to Amnesty, decapitation has been carried out by Iranian authorities as recently as 2001, but as of 2014 is no longer in use. It is also a legal form of execution in Qatar and Yemen, but the punishment has been suspended in those countries.

==== Historical occurrences ====
- The Islamic followers of Mohammed executed the men of the Jewish tribe of Banu Qurayza for a treaty violation, with several hundred killed in 627.
- After the Battle of Hattin (1187), Saladin personally beheaded Raynald of Châtillon; a Christian knight who served in the Second Crusade and organized attacks against Islam's two holiest cities.
- Forces of the Ottoman Empire invaded and laid siege to the city of Otranto and its citadel in 1480. According to a traditional account, after capture, more than 800 of its inhabitants – who refused to convert to Islam – were beheaded. They are known as the Martyrs of Otranto. The historicity of this account has been questioned by modern scholars.
- Muhammad Ahmad declared himself the Mahdi in 1880 and led jihad against the Ottoman Empire and their British allies. He and his followers beheaded opponents, Christian and Muslim alike, including the British general Charles Gordon.

== See also ==
- Capital and corporal punishment in Judaism
- Raif Badawi
- Religion and capital punishment#Islam
- Public executions in Saudi Arabia
- Capital punishment in Saudi Arabia
