= Gabriel =

Angel in Abrahamic religions

Saint Gabriel
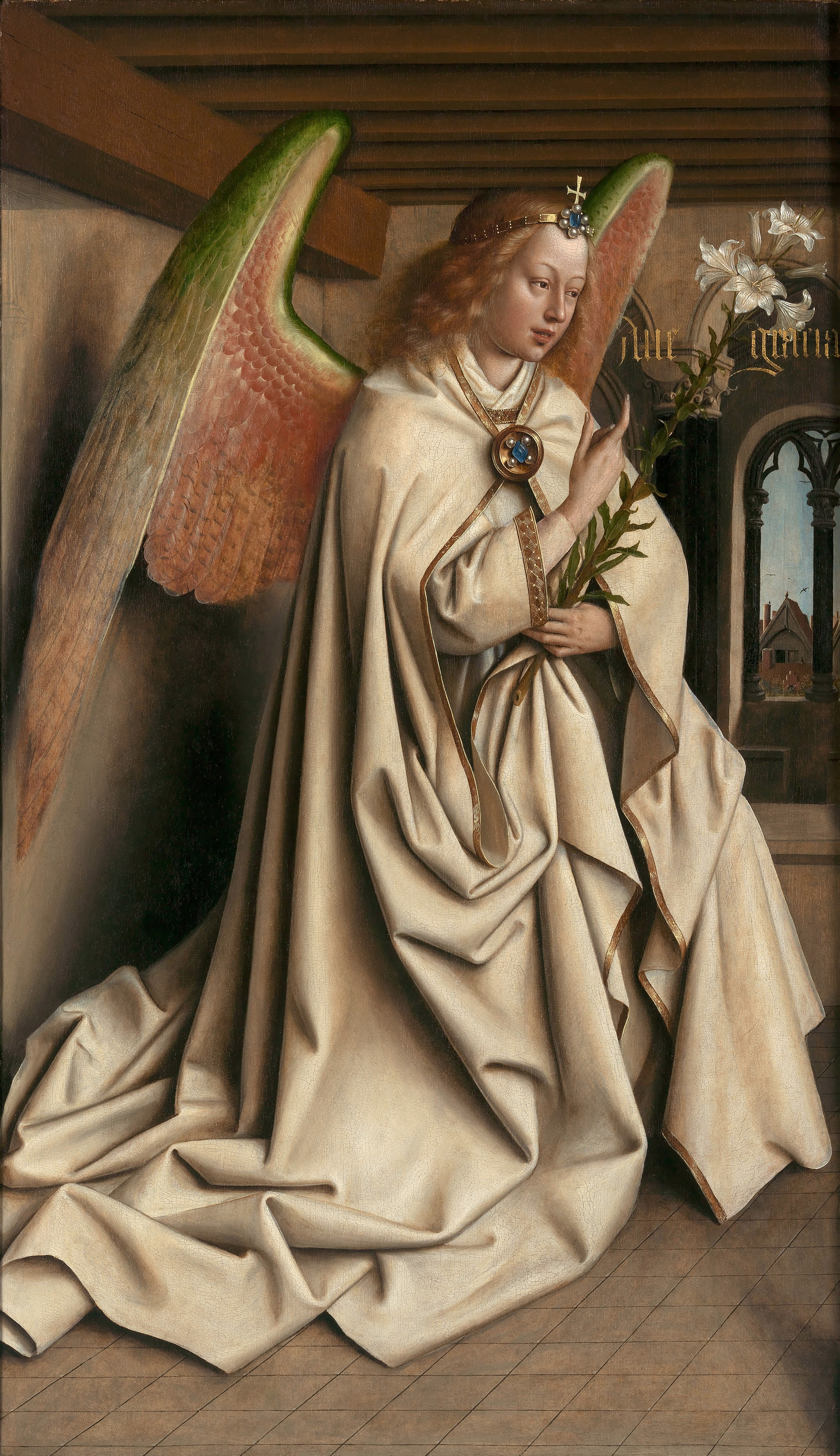
- Angel of the Annunciation from the Ghent Altarpiece by Jan van Eyck, 1432

Archangel Divine Herald Angel of Revelation
- Venerated in: All Christian denominations that venerate saints; Samaritanism; Judaism; Islam; and others (Note: Including, but not limited to: Yazidism, Alawism, Mormonism, Rastafari, Bábism and the Baháʼí Faith.)
- Feast: 29 September with angels Michael and Raphael (Catholic Church) (post-1969); 24 March (Western Rite Orthodoxy and General Roman Calendar before 1969); 26 March, 13 July (Eastern Orthodox Church); 13 Paoni, 22 Koiak and 26 Paoni (Coptic Church); 28 December (Tahsas 19) and 26 July (Hamle 19) Ethiopian calendar
- Attributes: White lily, trumpet, shining lantern, branch from Paradise, scroll and scepter
- Patronage: messengers (including telecommunication workers, postal workers, radio broadcasters, diplomats, and ambassadors), stamp collectors, Santander, Cebu

In Judaism, Christianity, Islam, and other Abrahamic religions, Gabriel (/ˈɡeɪbriəl/ GAY-bree-əl) (Note: Hebrew: גַּבְרִיאֵל, romanized: Gaḇrīʾēl, lit. 'Man of El [God]'; Ancient Greek: Γαβριήλ, romanized: Gabriḗl; Latin: Gabriel; Coptic: Ⲅⲁⲃⲣⲓⲏⲗ, romanized: Gabriêl; Amharic: ገብርኤል, romanized: Gabrəʾel; Imperial Aramaic: ܓ݁ܰܒ݂ܪܺܝܐܝܶܠ, romanized: Gaḇrīʾēl; Arabic: جِبْرِيل, romanized: Jibrīl, IPA: [dʒiˈbriːl], also Arabic: جبرائيل, romanized: Jibrāʾīl [dʒibræːˈʔiːl] or Jabrāʾīl.) is an archangel with the power to announce God's will to humankind as the messenger of God. He is mentioned in the Hebrew Bible, the New Testament and the Quran. In the Book of Daniel, Gabriel appears to the prophet Daniel to explain his visions. Gabriel also appears in the Jewish apocryphal First Book of Enoch (e.g., 1 Enoch 20:7–8) and other ancient Hebrew writings incompletely preserved or wholly lost in Hebrew. Alongside the archangel Michael, Gabriel is described as the guardian angel of the Israelites, defending them against the angels of the other peoples.

In the New Testament Gospel of Luke, Gabriel appears to Zechariah foretelling the birth of John the Baptist. Gabriel later appears to Mary, mother of Jesus to announce that she would conceive and bear a son (i.e., Jesus) via virgin birth. Many branches of Christianity—including Eastern Orthodoxy, the Catholic Church, Lutheranism, and Anglicanism—revere Gabriel as a saint. Islam regards Gabriel as an archangel sent by God to various prophets, including Muhammad. The first five verses of the Al-Alaq, the 96th chapter of the Quran, are believed by Muslims to have been the first verses of the revelations given by Gabriel to Muhammad.

== Etymology ==
The Biblical Hebrew name Gaḇrīʾēl (גַּבְרִיאֵל) is composed of the first person singular possessive form of the noun geber (גֶּבֶר), meaning "man", and ʾĒl, meaning "God" or "mighty one". Usually glossed as "God is my strength" or "Strength of God" in line with similar names like the archangel Raphael or the prophet Daniel, it has also been translated as "man of God" or "man of El". Proclus of Constantinople, in his Homily 1, stated that the meaning of Gabriel's name prefigured that Jesus, whose birth was announced by Gabriel, would be both man and God.

In his work, Four Homilies on the Missus Est, Saint Bernard (1090–1153 AD) interpreted Gabriel's name as "the strength of God" (Latin: Fortitudo Dei), and his symbolic function in the gospel story as announcement of the strength or virtue of Christ, both as the strength of God incarnate and as the strength given by God to the timorous people who would bring into the world a fearful and troublesome event. "Therefore it was an opportune choice that designated Gabriel for the work he had to accomplish, or rather, because he was to accomplish it therefore he was called Gabriel."

== Judaism ==
=== Hebrew Bible ===
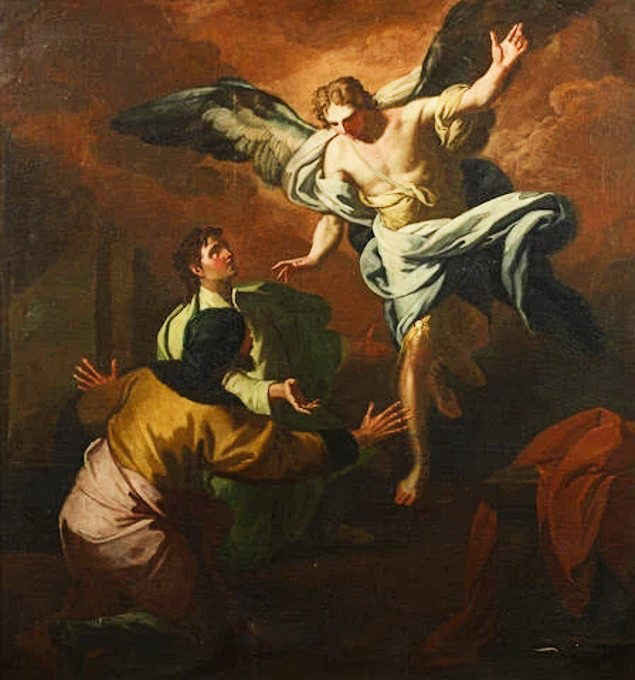
The Archangel Gabriel appears to the Prophet Daniel, attributed to Francesco Solimena (1657–1747).

The only book in the Hebrew Bible that explicitly mentions Gabriel is the Book of Daniel. Gabriel appears to the prophet Daniel to explain his visions (Daniel 8:15–26, 9:21–27). Later, in Daniel's final vision, an angel, not named but likely Gabriel again, appears to him and speaks of receiving help from Michael in battle against the prince of Persia and also Michael's role in times to come. The Book of Daniel contains the first instances of named angels in the Hebrew Bible. Gabriel's main function in the Book of Daniel is that of revealer, responsible for interpreting Daniel's visions, a role he continues to have in later traditions. In Daniel 10–12, while Gabriel is not named directly, many scholars infer his continued presence as the messenger who delivers Daniel’s final apocalyptic revelations.

Though he is not specifically named, the "man clothed with linen" mentioned in chapters 9 and 10 of the Book of Ezekiel is interpreted as Gabriel in Yoma 77a of the Babylonian Talmud.

=== Intertestamental literature ===
Gabriel is not referred to as an archangel in the Hebrew Bible or the New Testament. However, a wealth of Jewish literature was written during the Second Temple period (516 BC–70 AD). Much of the literature produced during this intertestamental period was of the apocalyptic genre. The names and ranks of angels and demons were greatly expanded in this literature, and each had particular duties and status before God. Gabriel was first referred to as an archangel in these texts.

In particular, there are many references to Gabriel in the Book of Enoch. According to the book, Michael, Uriel, Raphael, and Gabriel complain to God about the many wrongs perpetrated by Azazel and Samyaza (especially the fact that they revealed "eternal secrets" and sins to mankind and defiled themselves with women who later gave birth to giant offspring). As a result, God decides to destroy the Earth (which has been corrupted by the fallen angels, led by Azazel and Samyaza) and all of its inhabitants except for Noah. He sends Gabriel and the other archangels to go after the fallen angels and cast them into the darkness until the day of their judgment. In Chapter 20, Gabriel is listed as one of seven holy angels (Uriel, Raphael, Raguel, Michael, Saraqâêl, Gabriel, and Remiel) who watch. In Chapter 40, Gabriel is listed as one of four presences (Michael, Raphael, Gabriel, and Phanuel) who stand on the four sides of God. These four archangels will be the ones to cast the fallen angels into the abyss of condemnation on Judgment Day. The final reference to Gabriel in the Book of Enoch is found in Chapter 71: "And that Head of Days came with Michael and Gabriel, Raphael and Phanuel, thousands and ten thousands of angels without number."

The Book of Enoch is not considered to be canonical scripture by most Jewish or Christian church bodies, although it is part of the biblical canon used by the Ethiopian Jewish community, as well as the Ethiopian and Eritrean Orthodox Tewahedo Churches.

=== Rabbinic Judaism ===
According to Rabbinic Judaism, Gabriel—along with Michael, Uriel, and Raphael—is one of the four angels that stand at the four sides of God’s throne and serve as guardian angels of the four parts of the Earth. Michael stands at the right hand of God, while Gabriel (who ranks beneath Michael) stands at the left. Michael and Gabriel often work together, but Michael is mainly occupied in heaven, while Gabriel (as the messenger of God) typically executes God’s will on earth. Like all the angels, Gabriel has wings, but otherwise takes the form of a man. Gabriel is also associated with the metal gold (the color of fire).

Shimon ben Lakish (an amora of the third century) concluded that the angelic names of Michael, Raphael, and Gabriel came out of the Babylonian exile (Gen. Rab. 48:9). Alongside the archangel Michael, Gabriel is described as the guardian angel of Israel, defending the Israelites against the angels of the other nations.

=== Mystical Judaism ===
Gabriel is one of God's archangels in the Kabbalah literature. He is portrayed as working in concert with Michael as part of God's court, and he is identified with the sefira of Yesod. Gabriel is not to be prayed to because only God can answer prayers and sends Gabriel as his agent.

According to Jewish mythology, in the Garden of Eden there is a tree of life or the "tree of souls" that blossoms and produces new souls, which fall into the Guf, the treasury of souls. Gabriel reaches into the treasury and takes out the first soul that comes into his hand.

== Christianity ==
=== New Testament ===
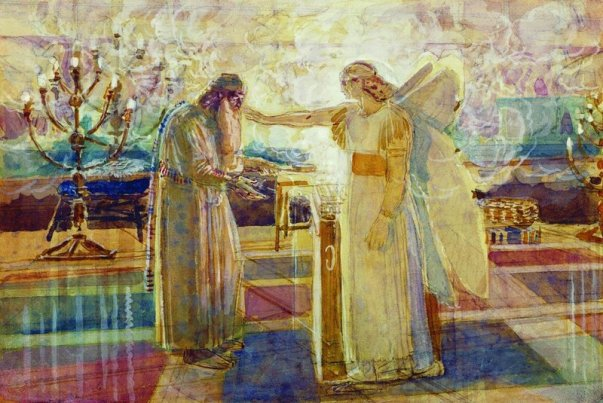
Gabriel announcing the birth of John the Baptist to Zechariah, by Alexander Andreyevich Ivanov, 1824

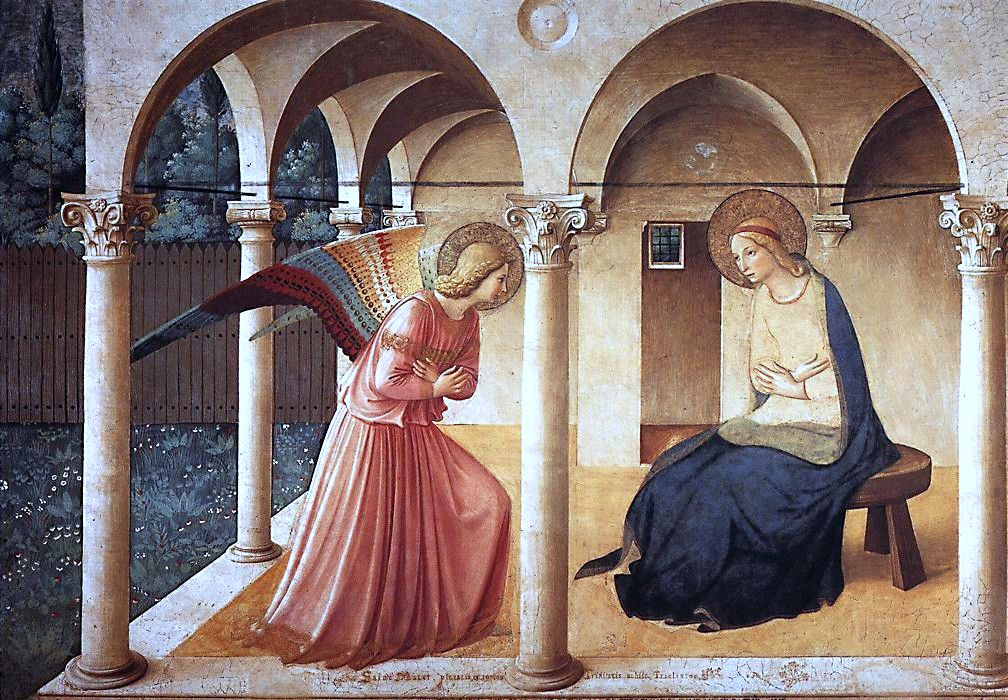
Gabriel announcing the incarnation to Mary, by Fra Angelico, c. 1440–1445

Gabriel's first appearance in the New Testament is found in the first part of Chapter 1 of the Gospel of Luke, in which he relates the annunciation of the birth of John the Baptist. John's father Zechariah was childless because his wife Elizabeth was barren. An angel appears to Zechariah to announce the birth of his son. When Zechariah questions the angel, the angel identifies himself as Gabriel (Luke 1:5–25).

Gabriel appears again in the second part of Chapter 1 of the Gospel of Luke, this time to announce the birth of Jesus to Mary (Luke 1:26–38). While in the first passage the angel identifies himself as Gabriel, in the second passage it is the author of Luke who identifies the angel as Gabriel.

The only other named angels in the New Testament are Michael (in Jude 1:9 and Revelation 12:7) and Abaddon (in Revelation 9:11).

=== Non-canonical texts ===
Gabriel is more frequently referenced in early Christian pseudepigraphic texts than in any of the canonical Biblical texts. For example, Gabriel is mentioned in some of the infancy gospels (e.g., Chapter 7 of the Nativity Gospel of Mary, Chapter 9 of the Protevangelium of James, and Chapter 1 of the First Gospel of the Infancy of Jesus Christ). Gabriel is also mentioned in some of the early Christian apocalyptic texts, such as the Greek Apocalypse of Ezra and the Second Book of Enoch (e.g., Chapter 21 and Chapter 24).

In Gnosticism, angels are portrayed as belonging to a pantheon of spiritual beings involved in the creation of the world. According to one ancient Gnostic manuscript, the Holy Book of the Great Invisible Spirit, Gabriel is a divine being and inhabitant of the pleroma that existed before the demiurge. There is also a reference to Gabriel in Chapter 17 of the Gospel of Judas, a Gnostic text dated to 280 AD.

=== Latter-day Saints ===
In the theology of the Church of Jesus Christ of Latter-day Saints, Gabriel is believed to have lived a mortal life as the prophet Noah. The two are regarded as the same individual; Noah being his mortal name and Gabriel being his heavenly name.

=== Feast day ===
The feast day of Saint Gabriel the Archangel was exclusively celebrated on 18 March according to many sources dating between 1588 and 1921; unusually, a source published in 1856 has the feast celebrated on 7 April for unknown reasons (a parenthetical note states that the day is normally celebrated on 18 March). Writer Elizabeth Drayson mentions the feast being celebrated on 18 March 1588 in her 2013 book "The Lead Books of Granada".

One of the oldest out-of-print sources placing the feast on 18 March, first published in 1608, is Flos sanctorum: historia general de la vida y hechos de Jesu-Christo ... y de los santos de que reza y haze fiesta la Iglesia Catholica ... by the Spanish writer Alonso de Villegas; a newer edition of this book was published in 1794. Another source published in Ireland in 1886 the Irish Ecclesiastical Record also mentions 18 March.

The Feast of Saint Gabriel was included by Pope Benedict XV in the General Roman Calendar in 1921, for celebration on 24 March. In 1969, the day was officially transferred to 29 September for celebration in conjunction with the feast of the archangels Ss. Michael and Raphael. Today, the 29 September date (known as Michaelmas) has been adopted by not only the Catholic Church, but also the Church of England, the Lutheran churches, the Anglican Communion, and the Western Orthodox churches.

The Eastern Orthodox Church and those Eastern Catholic Churches that follow the Byzantine Rite celebrate the Feast of the Archangels (Synaxis of the Archangel Michael and the Other Bodiless Powers) on 8 November. For those churches that follow the traditional Julian Calendar, 8 November currently falls on 21 November of the modern Gregorian Calendar, a difference of 13 days. Eastern Orthodox commemorate Gabriel not only at the Feast of the Archangels, but also on two other days:

- 26 March, the "Synaxis of the Archangel Gabriel" and celebrates his role in the Annunciation
- 13 July, also known as the "Synaxis of the Archangel Gabriel", which celebrates all the appearances and miracles attributed to Gabriel throughout history. The feast was first established on Mount Athos when, in the 9th century, during the reign of Emperor Basil II and Empress Constantina Porphyrogenitus and while Nicholas Chrysoverges was Patriarch of Constantinople, Gabriel appeared in a cell near Karyes, where he wrote with his finger on a stone tablet the hymn to the Theotokos, "It is truly meet ...".

Saint Gabriel the Archangel is commemorated on the vigil of the Feast of the Annunciation by Antiochian Western Rite Vicariate and Western Rite in the ROCOR.

The Coptic Orthodox Church celebrates Gabriel's feast on 13 Paoni, 22 Koiak, and 26 Paoni. One medieval Coptic work, the Investiture of the Archangel Gabriel, attributes the feast day of 22 Koiak to the day Gabriel was given the rank of archangel in heaven.

The Ethiopian Church celebrates Gabriel's feast on 18 December (in the Ethiopian calendar), with a sizeable number of its believers making a pilgrimage to a church dedicated to "Saint Gabriel" in Kulubi and Wonkshet on that day.

=== Gabriel's horn ===
A familiar literary trope of Gabriel has him blowing a trumpet blast to announce the resurrection of the dead at the end of time. However, though the Bible mentions a trumpet blast preceding the resurrection of the dead, it never specifies Gabriel as the trumpeter. Different passages state different things: the angels of the Son of Man (Matthew 24:31); the voice of the Son of God (John 5:25–29); God's trumpet (I Thessalonians 4:16); seven angels sounding a series of blasts (Revelation 8–11); or simply "a trumpet will sound" (I Corinthians 15:52). Likewise the early Christian Church Fathers do not mention Gabriel as a trumpeter; and in Jewish and Muslim traditions, Gabriel is again not identified as a trumpeter.

The earliest known identification of Gabriel as a trumpeter comes from the "Hymn for Protection in the Night", attributed to the Armenian Saint Nerses IV the Gracious (1102–1173):

The sound of Gabriel's trumpet on the last night, make us worthy to hear, and to stand on your right hand among the sheep with lanterns of inextinguishable light; to be like the five wise virgins, so that with the bridegroom in the bride chamber we, his spiritual brides may enter into glory.

A 1455 Armenian manuscript shows Gabriel sounding his trumpet as the dead climb out of their graves.

Another example occurs in John Milton's Paradise Lost (1667):

Betwixt these rockie pillars Gabriel sat
Chief of the Angelic guards (IV.545f) ...
He ended, and the Son gave signal high
To the bright minister that watch'd, he blew
His trumpet, heard in Oreb since perhaps
When God descended, and perhaps once more
To sound at general doom. (XI.72ff).

It is unclear whether Milton was inspired by the Armenian works, though they presumably have a common source.

The image of Gabriel's trumpet blast to announce the end of time was taken up in evangelical Christianity, where it became widespread, notably in African American spirituals.

== Islam ==
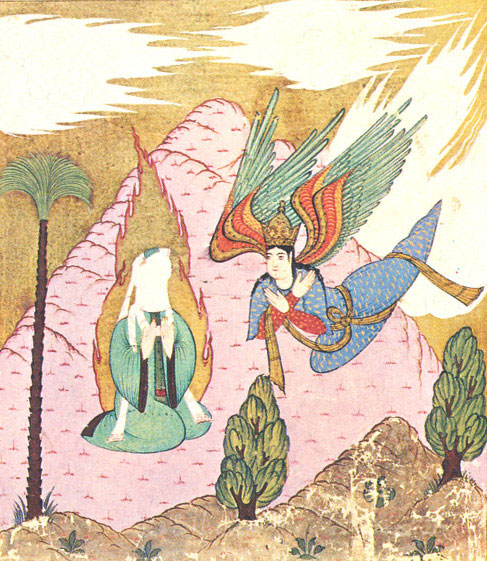
A 16th-century Siyer-i Nebi image of the archangel Jibril (Gabriel) visiting Muhammad

Gabriel (Hejazis Arabic: جِبْرِيل, romanized: Jibrīl; also Arabic: جبرائيل, romanized: Jibrāʾīl; other canonical writings include: Jabrāʾīl, ''Jabrīl, Jabrāyīl, and Jibrāʾīn) derived from the Hebrew: גַּבְרִיאֵל, romanized: Gaḇrīʾēl) in many places in the Qur'an, is revered as one of the primary archangels and as the Angel of Revelation in Islam. He is primarily mentioned in the verses 2:97, 2:98 and 66:4 of the Quran. However, the Quranic text doesn't refer to him as an angel. In the Quran, the archangel Gabriel appears named in 2:97 and 66:4, as well as in 2:98, where he is mentioned along with the archangel Michael.

Tafsir (Exegetical Quranic literature) narrates that Muhammad saw the archangel Gabriel in his full angelic splendor only twice, the first time being when he received his first revelation. Islamic tradition holds that Gabriel was sent to numerous pre-Islamic Biblical prophets with revelation and divine injunctions, including Adam, whom Muslims believe was consoled by Gabriel sometime after the Fall, too. He is known by many names in Islam, such as "keeper of holiness". In Hadith traditions, Jibril is said to have six hundred wings.

In Islam, the tree of souls is referred to as the Sidrat al-Muntaha (and is identified as a Ziziphus spina-christi).

=== As a messenger ===
Muslims believe that Gabriel was tasked with transmitting the scriptures from God to the prophets and messengers, as Asbab al-Nuzul or revelation. When Muhammad was questioned which angel is revealing the holy scriptures, he told the Jews they are revealed by Gabriel.

Muslims also revere Gabriel for several events that predate what they regard as the first revelation narrated in the Quran. Muslims believe that Gabriel was the angel who informed Zechariah of the Nativity of John the Baptist, as well as Mary about the future nativity of Jesus; and that Gabriel was one of three angels who had earlier informed Abraham of the birth of Isaac (51:24–30). Gabriel also makes a famous appearance in the Hadith of Gabriel, in which he questions Muhammad on the core tenets of Islam.

Gabriel is also believed to have delivered punishment from God to the Sodomites by leveling the entire city of Sodom with the tip of his wing. According to a Hadith narrated by Abu Dharr al-Ghifari, which is compiled by al-Hakim al-Tirmidhi, Gabriel has the ability to regulate feeling or perception in humans, particularly happiness or sadness.

=== As a warrior ===
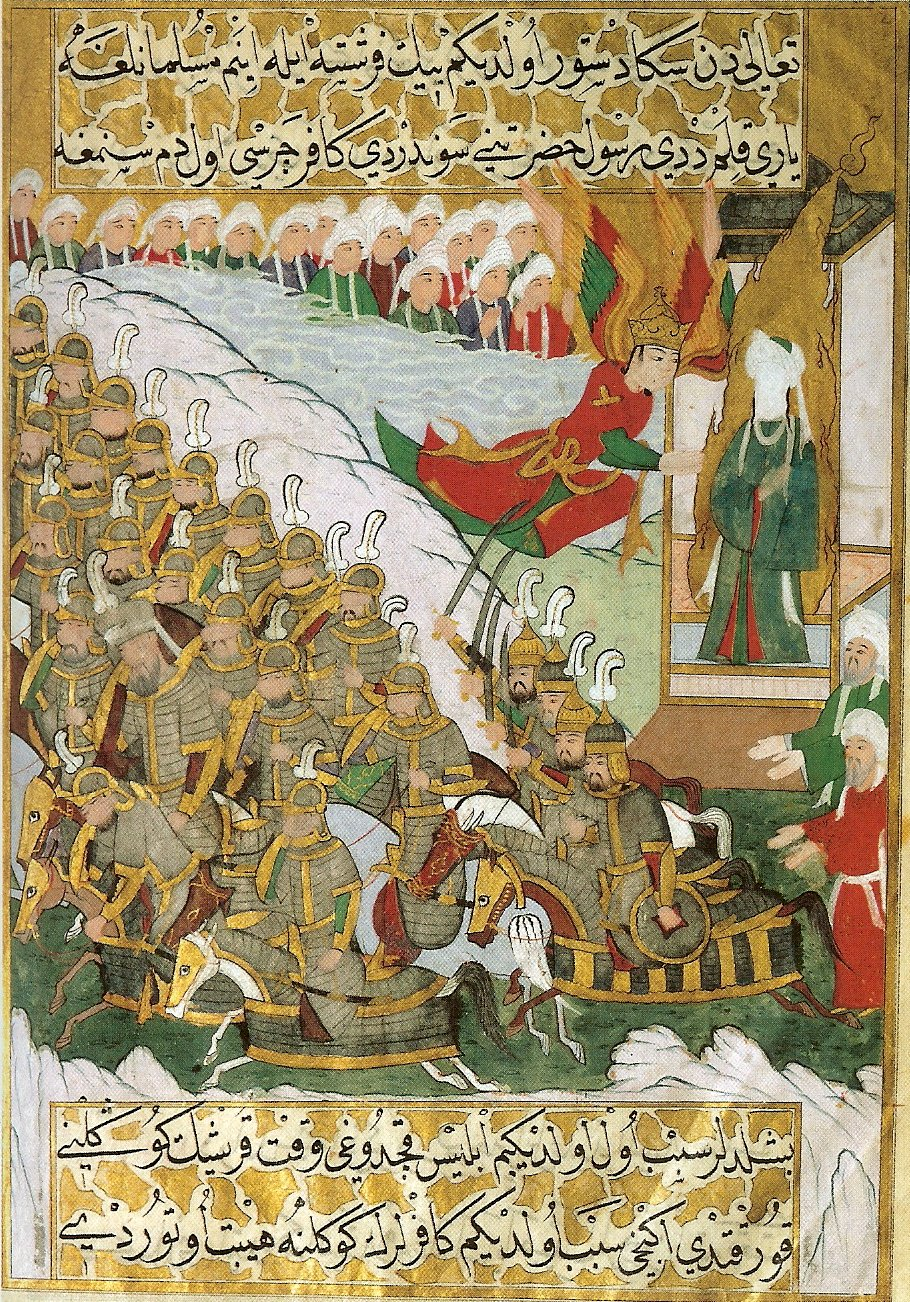
Muhammad at the Battle of Badr, advised by an angel (Siyer-i Nebi, 16th century)

Gabriel is believed to have helped Muhammad overcome his adversaries significantly against an ifrit during the Night Journey. Gabriel is also believed to have helped Muhammad overcome his adversaries during the Battle of Badr, where according to scholars and clerics of Islam, the various hadiths, both authentics and inauthentics, has mentioned that Gabriel, Michael, Raphael, (Note: Found in Mustadrak al Sahihayn. The complete narration from Al-Hakim al-Nishapuri were: "Abu Abdullah Muhammad bin Yaqoub has reported from Ibrahim bin Abdullah Al-Saadi, who told us Muhammad bin Khalid bin Uthma, told us Musa bin Yaqoub, told me Abu Al-Huwairith, that Muhammad bin Jubayr bin Mut’im told him, that he heard Ali – may God be pleased with him – addresses the people, and he said: While I was leaving from the well of Badr, a strong wind came, the like of which I had never seen, then it left, then came a strong wind, the like of which I have never seen except for the one before it, then it went, then came a strong wind that I did not see before. I have never seen anything like it except for the one before it, and the first wind was Gabriel descended among a thousand angels with the Messenger of God – may God bless him and grant him peace – and the second wind was Michael who descended among a thousand angels to the right of the Messenger of God – may God bless him and his family and grant them peace – and Abu Bakr was On his right, and the third wind was Israfil. He descended with a thousand angels on the side of the Messenger of God – may God's prayers and peace be upon him and his family - and I was on the right side. When God Almighty defeated his enemies, the Messenger of God – may God's prayers and peace be upon him and his family - carried me on his horse, I blew up, and I fell On my heels, I prayed to God Almighty …" Ibn al Mulqin, Hadith scholar from Cordoba of 13–14 AD century, evaluate this hadith that he found weaknesses in Musa ibn Yaqoub and Abu al Huwairith chain, so he deemed there is weakness about this hadith. However, recent scholarship from Ali Hasan al-Halabi has noted there is another hadith which supported the participation of Raphael in Badr) (Note: According to Islamic belief in weak chain of Hadith, Raphael were acknowledged as angel who were tasked to blower of Armageddon trumpet, and one of archangels who bear the Throne of God on their back.) and thousands of best angels from third level of heaven, all came to the battle of Badr by impersonating the appearance of Zubayr ibn al-Awwam, a Companion of the Prophet and bodyguard of the prophet. (Note: According to one Hadith, Muhammad were told that the angels that appeared in the battle of Badr were highest in status and the "best of angels" according to Gabriel in Hadith narrated by Muhammad.) This is deemed as Zubayr's honor according to Islamic belief. (Note: According to one narration, during the battle, Muhammad found an angel whom he thought was Zubayr standing next to him, which then prompted Muhammad to command him to attack, which the angel, in Zubayr's appearance, simply replied, "I am not Zubayr". Thus, this is another indication that the angels truly came down with the appearance of Zubayr during Badr.) Meanwhile, Safiur Rahman Mubarakpuri has recorded in his historiography works of Quran and Hadith revelation in Prophetic biography, that Sa'd ibn Abi Waqqas testified he saw two unidentified warriors clad in white had protected Muhammad during the Battle of Uhud, that later being confirmed by Muhammad those two unidentified warriors were Jibril and Michael in disguise.

Moreover, he is believed to have further encouraged Muhammad to wage war and attack the Jewish tribe of Banu Qurayza. Another appearance of Gabriel in Islamic religious texts were found in numerous Hadiths during the Battle of Hunayn, where the Gabriel stood next to Muhammad. Gabriel is also said to have fought Iblis, when the latter tempted ʿĪsā (Jesus). Ibn Barrajan regards Gabriel to be an angel created from fire, like Iblis, thus settling Gabriel symbolically into the head of opposition to the leader of the devils.

Other Islamic texts and some apocryphal literature also supported Gabriel's role as a celestial warrior. Though alternate theories exist, whether the occurrence of the Holy Spirit in the Quran refers to Gabriel or not, remains an issue of scholarly debate. However, a clear distinction between apocryphal and Quranic references to Gabriel is that the former doesn't designate him as the Holy Spirit in the First Book of Enoch, which narrates the story of Gabriel defeating the Nephilim.

== Other traditions ==
The Yazidis worship Seven Archangels, among them Cibrayîl (Gabriel), Mîkayîl (Michael), Derdayîl, Ezrayîl, Şifqayîl, and Ezazîl, who are emanations from God, to whom God entrusted the world. Other angels in Yazidism include Ezafîl. The Yazidis often associate Gabriel with Tawûsî Melek (the "Peacock Angel").

Yazdânism and Yarsanism share many elements with Yazidism, including seven secondary divine manifestations, emanationism and the incarnation of the archangel Gabriel (Pir Benjamin in Yarsanism).

Mandaeans venerate Ptahil as the "Fourth Life" (the third of three emanations from the First Life). Ptahil is an uthra, identified with Gabriel, who creates the poorly made material world with the help of Ruha, a sinful and fallen female ruler who inhabits the World of Darkness. Ruha and Ptahil's roles in creation vary, with each gaining control when the other's power subsides. According to Brikha Nasoraia, the creation of the material world occurs by God's command, but is delegated to Ptahil (a subservient emanation or uthra) with the assistance of Gabriel and others.

== Interpretatio graeca ==
In the oath for the treaty between Philip V of Macedon and Hannibal of Carthage in 215 BC, the Carthaginian gods were invoked to bless the agreement. This oath was preserved by the historian Polybius, who referred to the gods by their corresponding Greek names. In the case of the king of the Punic pantheon, Baal Hammon, he was identified as Zeus.

Identifications of the Carthaginian gods in the Treaty between Hannibal and Philip V
Greek god	Carthaginian god		Tyrian god	Ugaritic god
Greek god	Xella	Barré, Clifford	Tyrian god	Ugaritic god
Zeus	Baal Hammon	Baal Hammon	Bayt-il	El

Thus, Gabriel can be translated as "Zeus is my strength." And in certain neo-pagan traditions centered on Greco-Jewish syncretism, Gabriel is identified with Hermes and Iris.

== Art, entertainment, and media ==
Angels are described as pure spirits. The lack of a defined form allows artists wide latitude in depicting them. Amelia R. Brown draws comparisons in Byzantine iconography between portrayals of angels and the conventions used to depict court eunuchs. Mainly from the Caucasus, they tended to have light eyes, hair, and skin; and those "castrated in childhood developed a distinctive skeletal structure, lacked full masculine musculature, body hair and beards ..." As officials, they would wear a white tunic decorated with gold. Brown suggests that "Byzantine artists drew, consciously or not, on this iconography of the court eunuch". Some recent popular works on angels consider Gabriel to be female or androgynous.

=== Painting and sculpture ===
Gabriel is most often portrayed in the context of the Annunciation. In 2008, a 16th-century drawing by Lucas van Leyden of the Netherlands was discovered. George R. Goldner, chairman of the department of prints and drawings at New York's Metropolitan Museum of Art, suggested that the sketch was for a stained glass window. "The fact that the archangel is an ordinary-looking person and not an idealized boy is typical of the artist", said Goldner.

The Military Order of Saint Gabriel was established to recognize "individuals who have made significant contributions to the U.S. Army Public Affairs community and practice". The medallion depicts St. Gabriel sounding a trumpet, while the obverse displays the Army Public Affairs emblem.

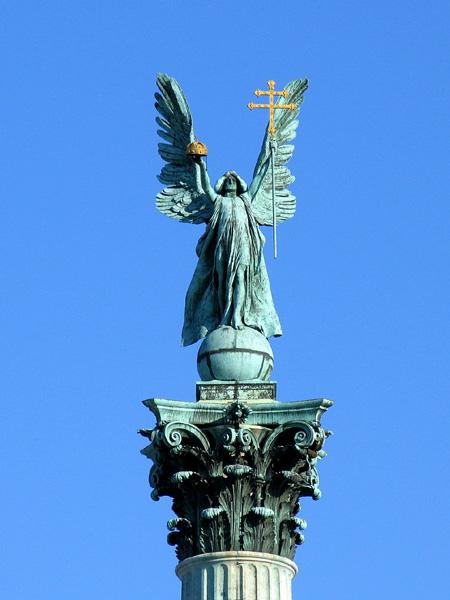
Archangel Gabriel Millennium Monument at Heroes' Square in Budapest

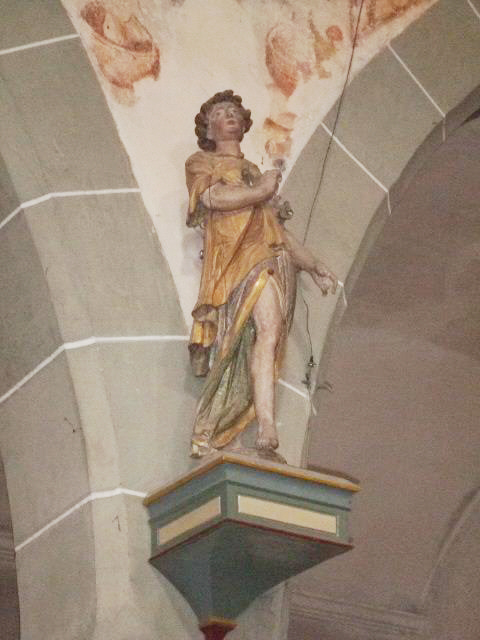
Archangel Gabriel in the church of St. Georg in Bermatingen

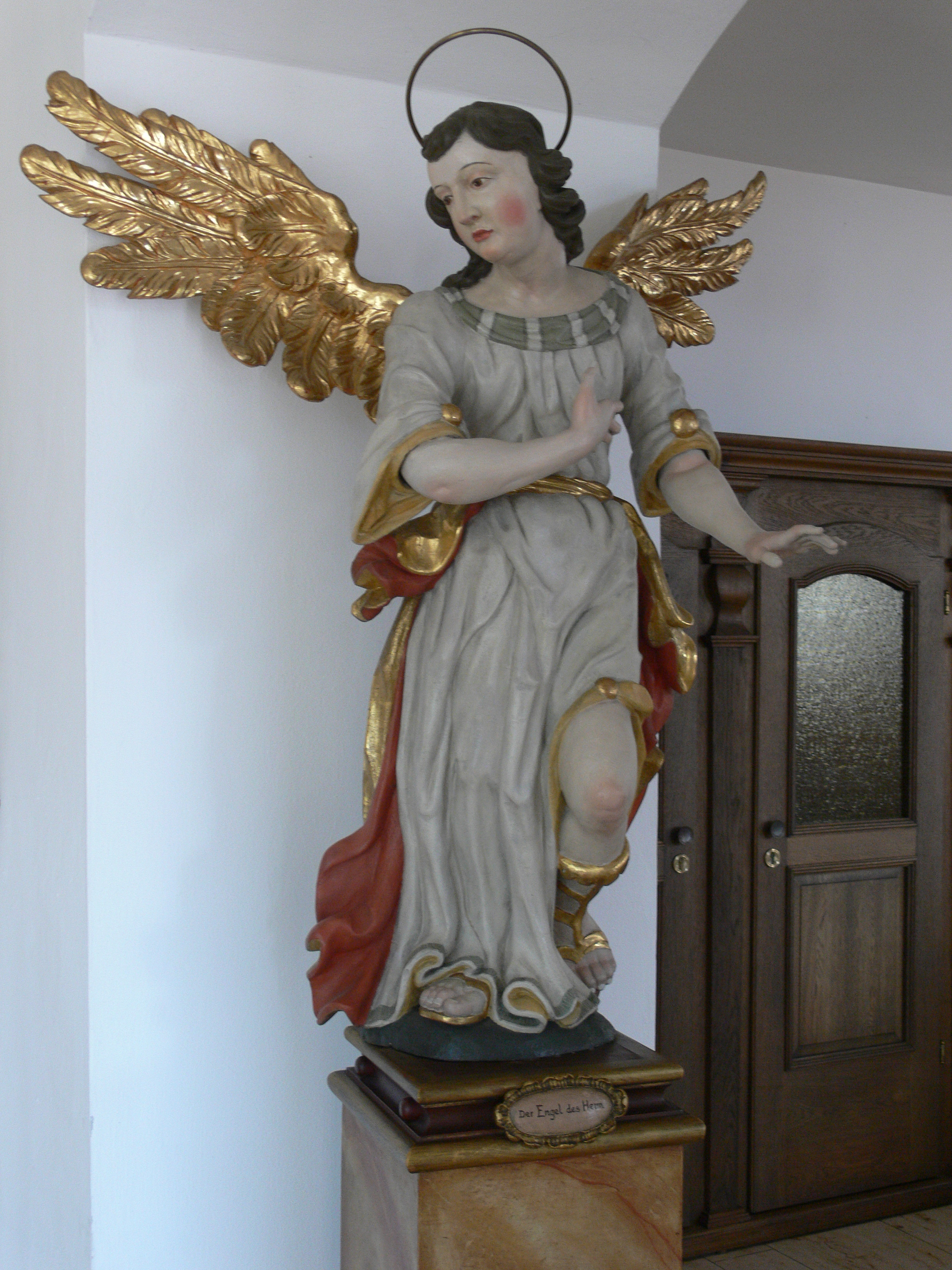
Archangel Gabriel in the church of St. Magnus in Waldburg

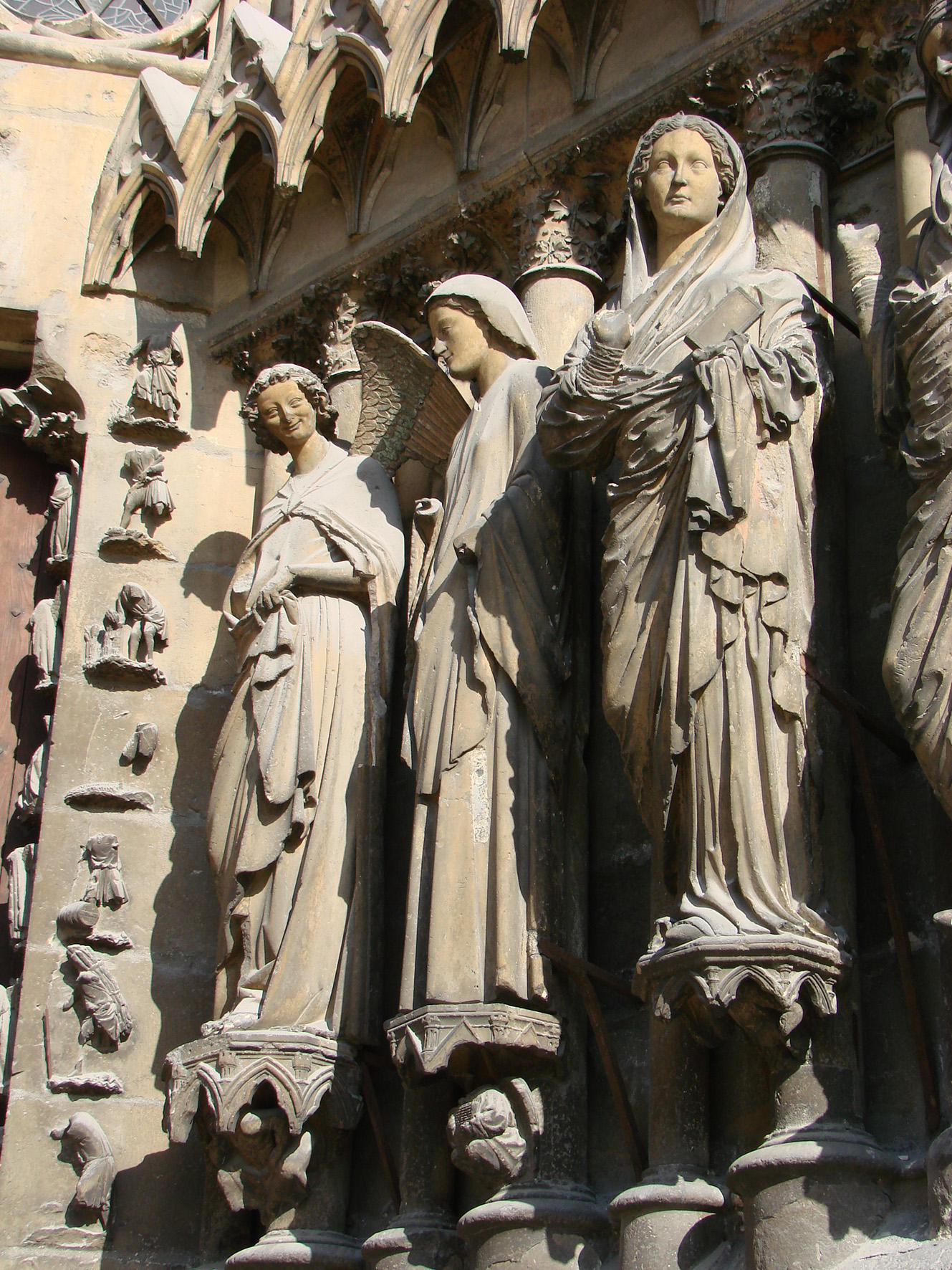
Archangel Gabriel at the façade of the Cathedral of Reims

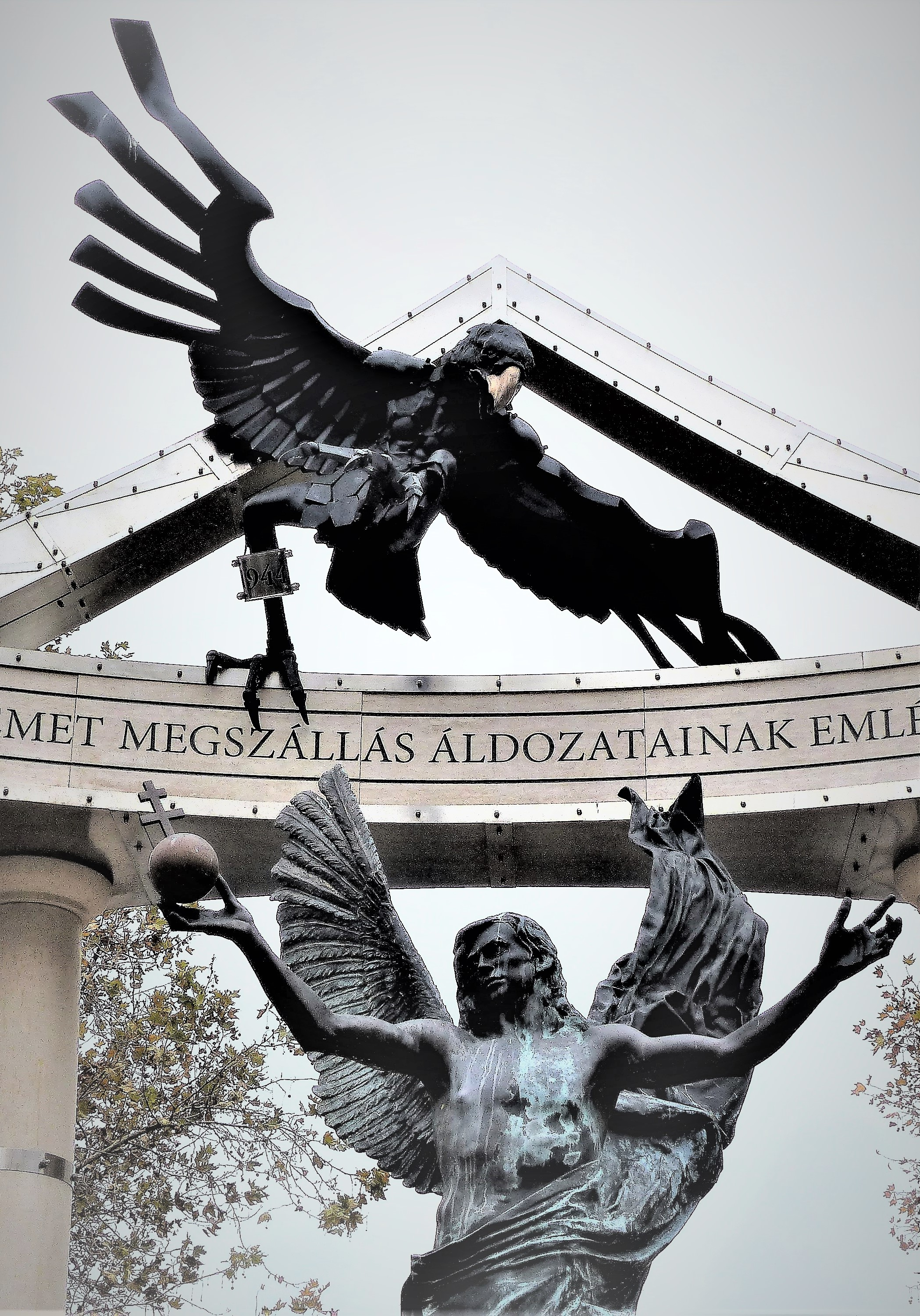
Archangel Gabriel at the Liberty Square, Budapest

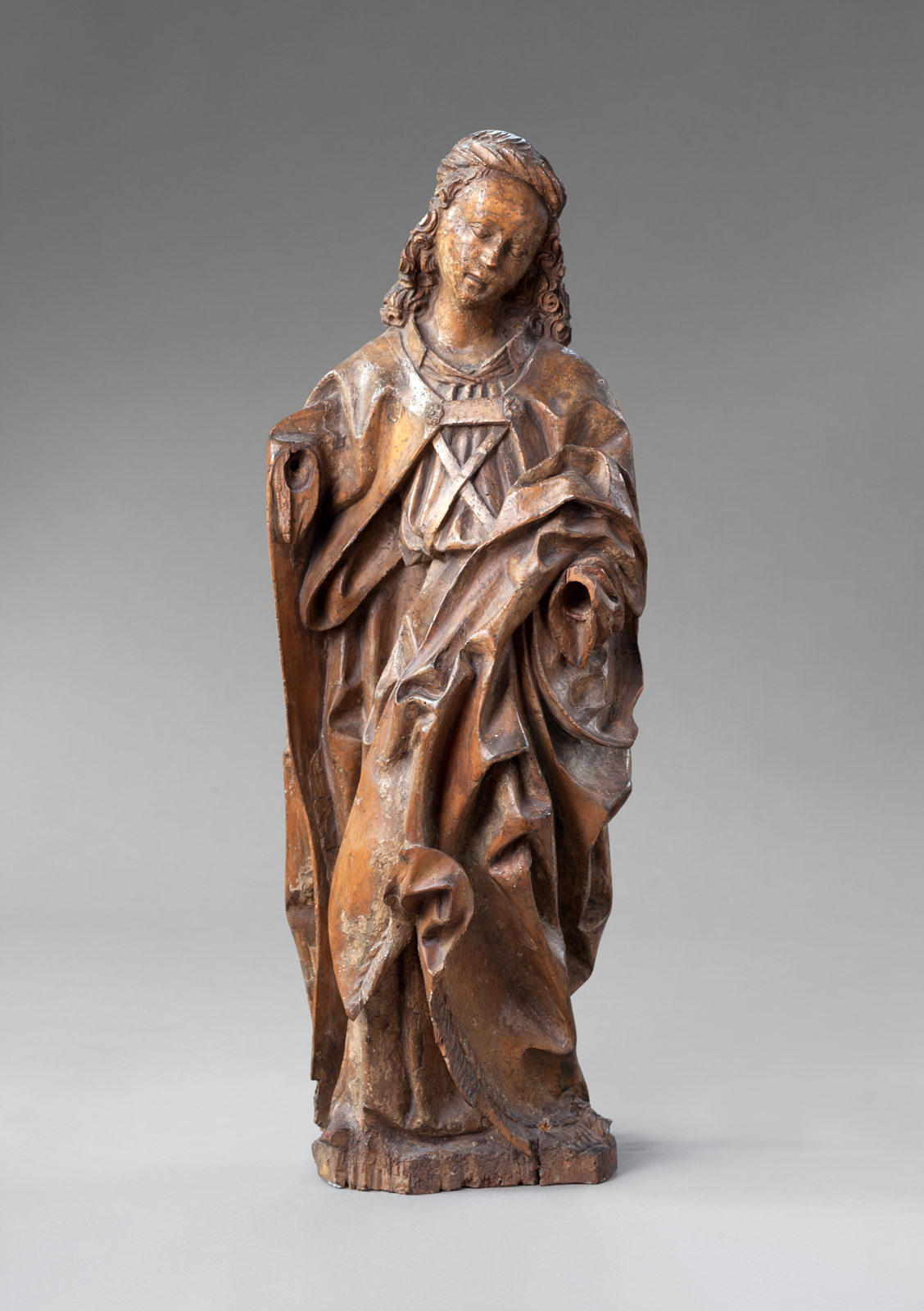
Archangel Gabriel of Nedvědice

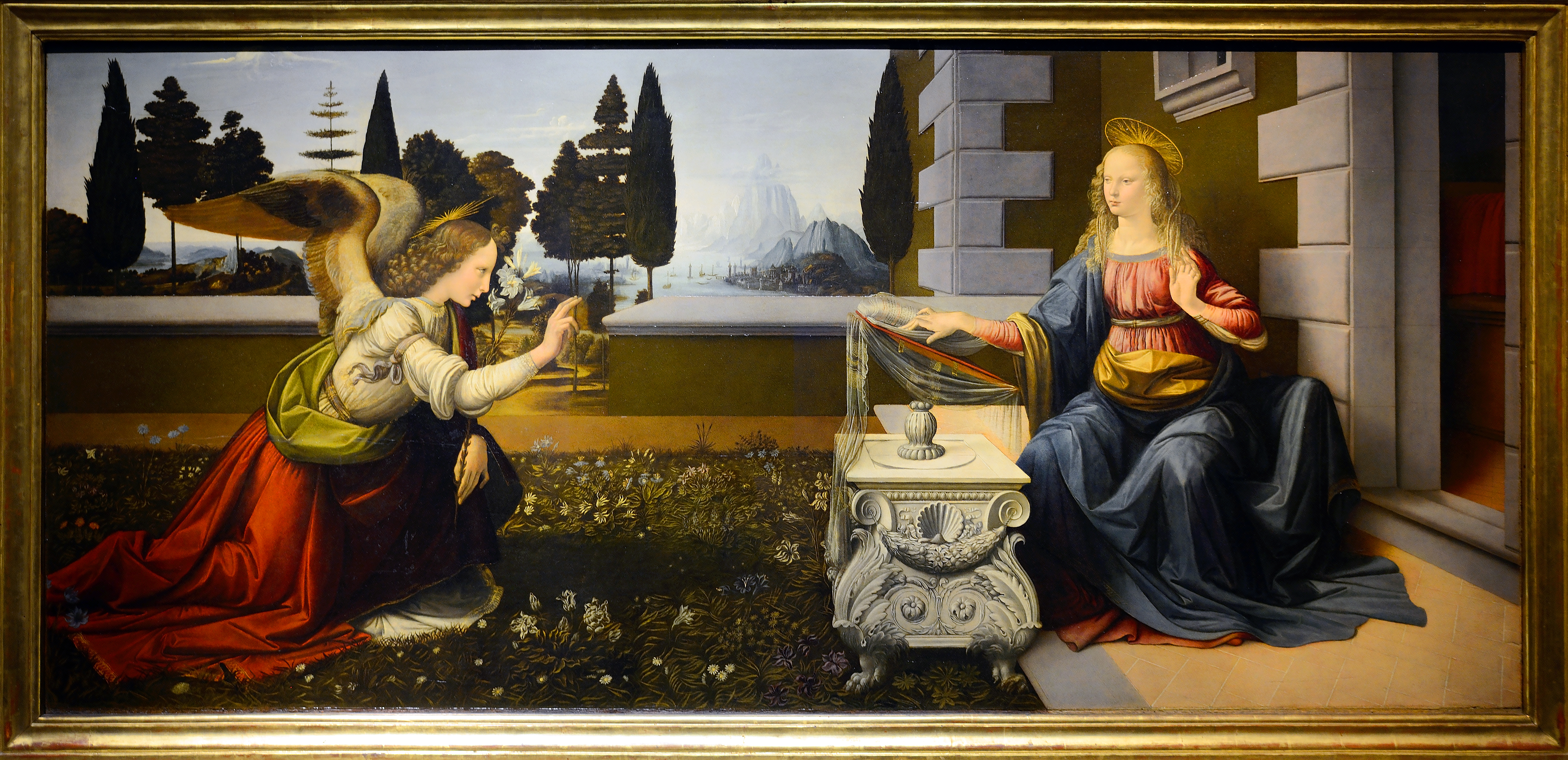
Gabriel and Mary in Leonardo da Vinci's Annunciation, c. 1472–1475

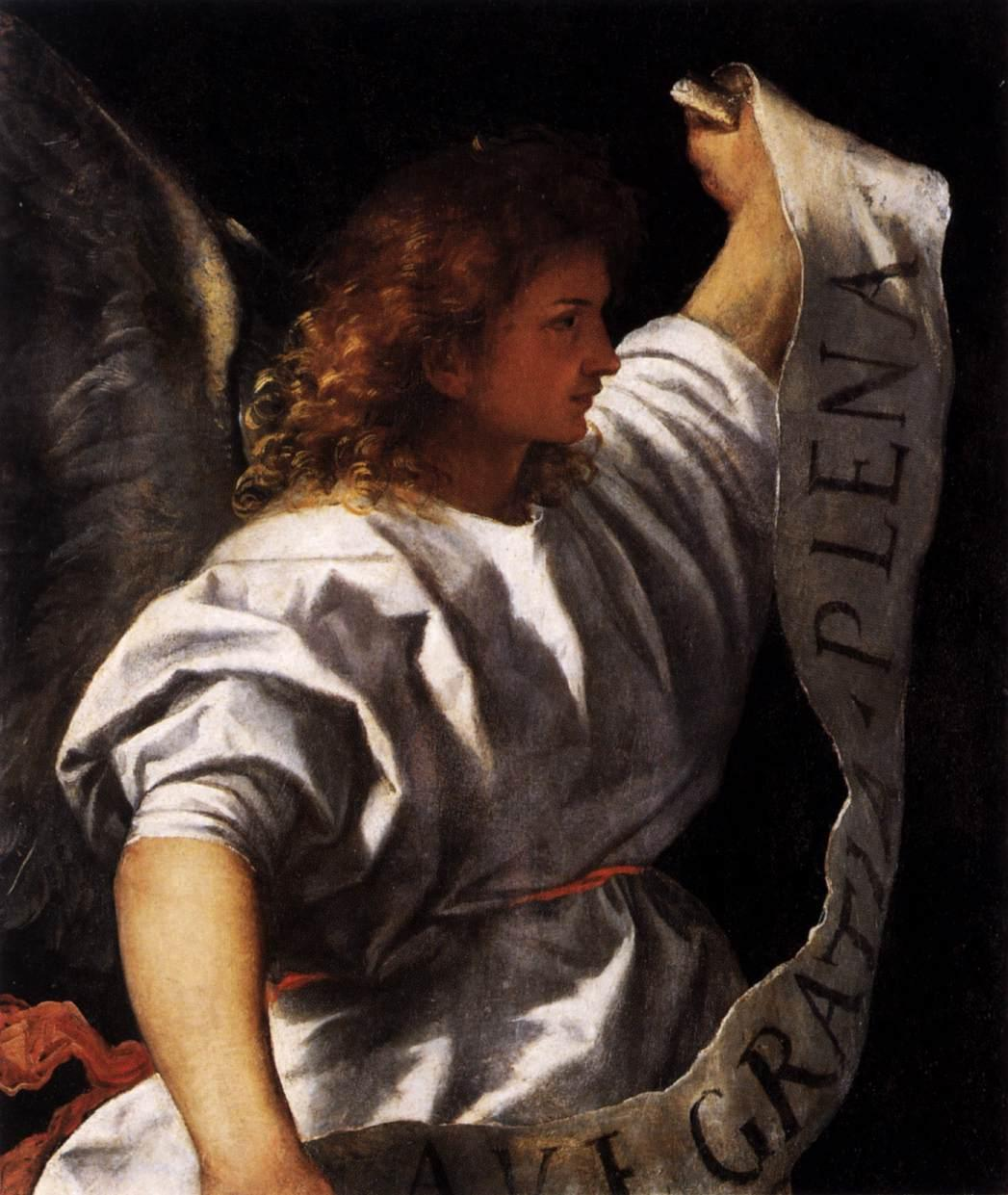
Angel of the Annunciation by Titian (1520–1522)

=== Festivals ===
Baltimore's (Maryland) "Little Italy" neighborhood has for over 80 years hosted an annual "end of summer" St. Gabriel Festival that features a procession with a statue of the saint carried through the streets.

=== Video games ===
The first-person shooter game Ultrakill features Gabriel as the main antagonist and narrative protagonist, although Gabriel in-game and Gabriel in Biblical canon have many differences.

=== TV shows ===
- Gabriel is a character in the TV series Supernatural. He is the youngest of the archangels and impersonates a trickster, then Loki, in order to hide from Heaven. He is portrayed by Richard Speight Jr.
- Gabriel is one of the antagonists in the first season of the TV show Good Omens and one of the main protagonists of the second one. He is the Supreme Archangel in charge of the forces of Heaven. He is portrayed by Jon Hamm.

== See also ==
- Angel of the Lord
- Angelus
- Hermes
- Hierarchy of angels
- List of angels in theology
- List of names referring to El
- Ptahil-Uthra—Also identified as Gabriel in Mandaeism
- Saint Gabriel, patron saint archive
