= Jewish Question in Poland =

Jewish Question in Poland may refer to:

- Franciszek Bujak, essay La question Juive en Pologne, 1919
- Stanisław Kutrzeba, essay La question Juive en Pologne, 1919
- Gabriel Jean Edmond Séailles, essay La question juive en Pologne - Enquête, 1916

== See also ==
- Jewish Question
- History of Jews in Poland
