= Boabdil's Farewell to Granada =

Painting by Alfred Dehodencq

Boabdil’s Farewell to Granada
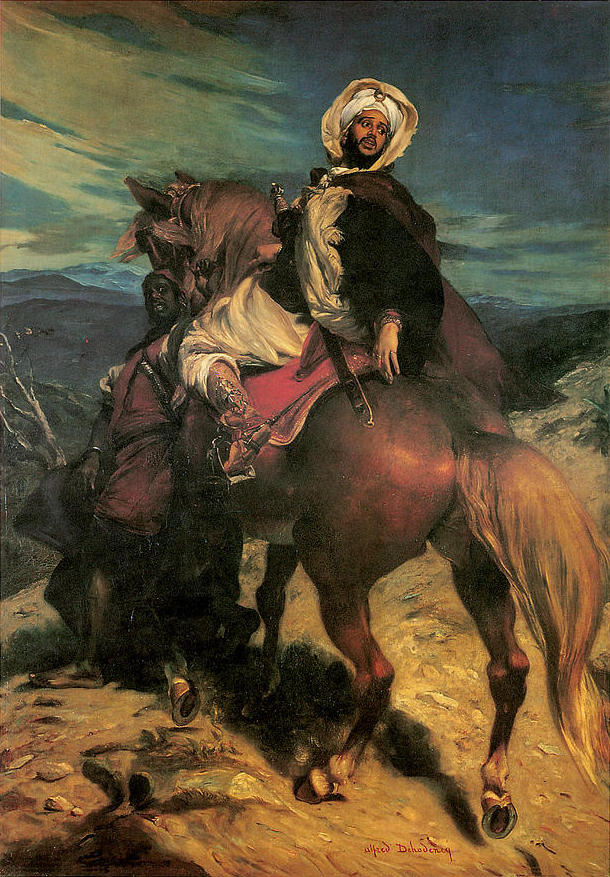
- Artist: Alfred Dehodencq
- Year: 1860s
- Dimensions: 377 cm (148 in) × 275 cm (108 in)
- Identifiers: Joconde work ID: 000PE028957

Boabdil's Farewell to Granada (French: L'Adieu du roi Boabdil à Grenade) is an oil-on-canvas painting by Alfred Dehodencq. It was first exhibited at the Salon of 1869 and is currently in the collection of the Musée d'Orsay.

There are numerous drawn studies and two painted sketches by Dehodencq that show little variation with the finished work. One of these is at the Arnoldi-Livie Gallery in Munich and the other is in the Snite Museum of Art at the University of Notre Dame. The Louvre also has a sketch for a figure who may be Boabdil.

== Subject ==
The painting depicts an episode in the life of the last Emir of Granada, Mohammed XI, known as Boabdil. Sent into exile after Granada fell in 1492, he turned back for one last look at his city, and wept. The high-angled perspective of the viewer and Boabdil's backward turn, against the forward movement of his horse and groom, make the composition particularly lively and moving.

== History ==
- 1869 - Salon - Paris, then First International Art Exhibition, Glaspalast, Munich: bought from the artist by the state for the musée de Roubaix
- 1869 - Musée de Roubaix
- 1940 - musée des Beaux-Arts, Tourcoing
- 1984, musée d'Orsay, Paris

== Critical reception ==
Paul Armand Silvestre noted that the style of the painting owed much to Eugène Delacroix, but was unlikely to please his supporters. Théophile Thoré-Bürger agreed that Denhodencq imitated Delacroix, and described the painting as "a composition without character, poorly drawn and heavily painted. Maurice Cristal felt that the composition was not above reproach, but the artist's the use of colour and light was remarkable, producing a canvas that radiated life.

Gabriel Jean Edmond Séailles was more generous in his judgement, praising the grandeur of its melancholy beauty. As he saw it, Denhodencq's mastery ensured that the bitter sadness of Boabdil transcended his person and situation and became part of an impersonal and universal sadness at the human condition. He also detailed how the concept of the painting evolved through the artist's sketches. The first version showed Granada far off in the distance, and close to Boabdil a group of Arab women including his mother, who is said to have jeered at him "weep, weep like a woman for the city you could not defend like a man." This early version was a narrative painting, full of corroborative detail about the famous anecdote. However the final version strips out these details, leaving nothing but Boabdil, his horse and groom, and nothing to distract the viewer from the intensity of his feeling. This radical simplicity makes his suffering universal.

== See also ==
- The Moor's Last Sigh, a novel by Salman Rushdie
- The Sigh of the Moor, a painting by Francisco Pradilla Ortiz
- Puerto del Suspiro del Moro
