= Sol Hachuel =

Moroccan Jewish woman executed for alleged apostasy from Islam (1817–1834)

Tzadik Sol Hachuel
- סוליקא חג׳ואל زليخة حتشويل
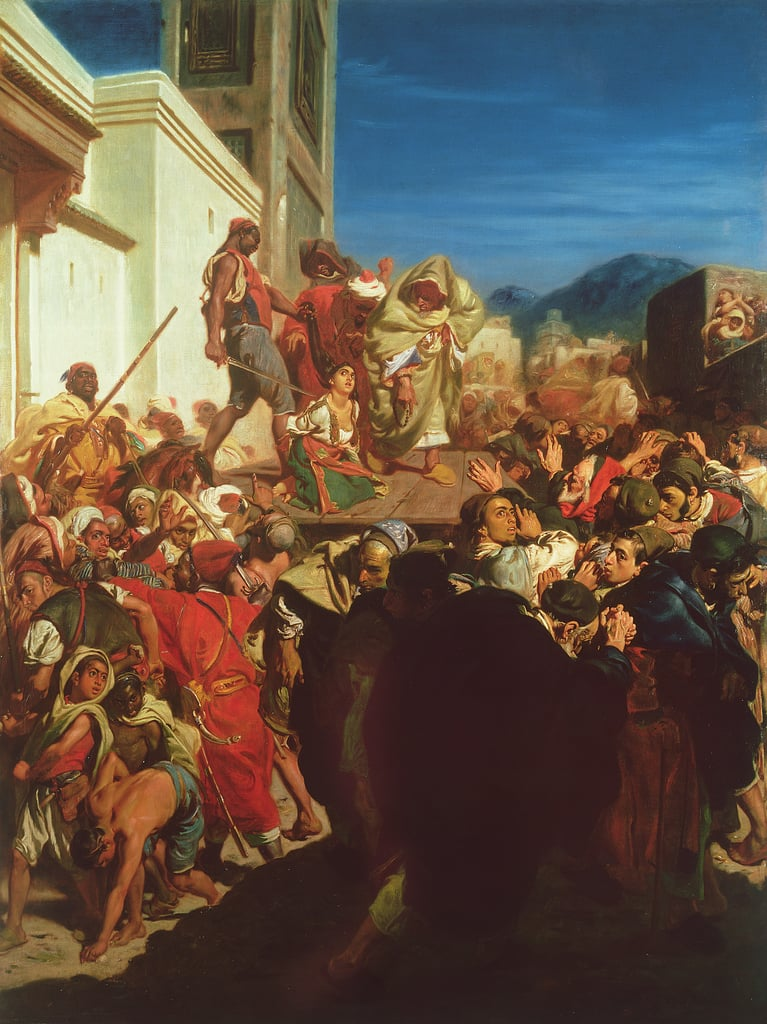
- Execution of a Moroccan Jewess (c. 1861) by Alfred Dehodencq
- Born: 1817; Tangier, Sultanate of Morocco
- Died: 5 June 1834 (aged 17); Fez, Sultanate of Morocco
- Cause of death: Beheading
- Resting place: Mellah of Fez
- Known for: Refusal to convert to Islam
- Criminal charges: Apostasy
- Criminal penalty: Capital punishment
- Parents: Chaim Hachuel (father); Simcha Hachuel (mother)

Solika "Sol" Hachuel (Hebrew: סוֹלִיקָא "סוֹל" חַג׳וּאֵל, romanized: Sōlīqā "Sōl" Ḥaǧūʾēl; Arabic: زليخة حتشويل, romanized: Zulaykha Ḥatshuwayl; Moroccan Arabic: لالة زليخة, romanized: Lālla Zlīkha, lit. 'Lady Zuleikha'; 1817 – June 5, 1834) was a Jewish woman from Tangier, Morocco, who was executed by decapitation in Fez in 1834, at the age of 17, for the charge of apostasy after her Muslim neighbors falsely claimed that she had converted to Islam, which she refuted. Her story has been retold in a variety of languages and genres over the following century, with each retelling affected by its own language, cultural context, and historical circumstances. She is widely regarded as a martyr and tzadika among Jews and a saint among Moroccan muslims celebrated and revered for her loyalty to her faith.

Hachuel's self-sacrifice served as an inspiration to many painters and writers. One of the most detailed accounts, based on interviews with eyewitnesses, is from Spanish writer Eugenio María Romero. His book El Martirio de la Jóven Hachuel, ó, La Heroina Hebrea (lit. 'The Martyrdom of the Young Hachuel, or, The Hebrew Heroine') was first published in 1837 and republished in 1838. Hachuel's story was also the subject of a song by French musician Françoise Atlan on the record Romances Séfardies (lit. 'Sephardic Romances').

In the 1860s, French artist Alfred Dehodencq painted multiple versions of a work depicting the execution of a Jewish woman in Morocco; one of these paintings was exhibited at the Paris Salon of 1861 under the title Exécution d'une juive, au Maroc (Execution of a Moroccan Jewess). Some scholars say that Dejodencq was inspired by the story of Sol Hachuel; however, his friend and biographer, the French philosopher Gabriel Séailles, states explicitly in more than one book that Dehodencq was an eye-witness to the execution he depicted.

== Sources ==
The public decapitation of a young Jewish Moroccan woman because of her Muslim neighbors' testimony was a spectacle that generated many textual and oral retellings over the following century. Some of the genres used by Sephardim to eulogize her included Hebrew laments (qinōt), Arabic stories (qiṣṣas), and romanceros or ballads in Ladino. Europeans have retold her story in media ranging from an epic poem to a French melodrama in four acts to an oil painting. Many accounts are still in manuscript form and are held in public archives or private collections.

=== Early accounts ===
Moshe Ben Sa'adon provided an early account in Moroccan Arabic in Qiṣṣat Sulika recorded in the 1835 manuscript Qiṣṣot le-Tishʿah be-Av from Taroudant. An account was published by the Ladino newspaper La Epoka in 1902.

According to the account of Israel Joseph Benjamin, a Romanian Jewish explorer who visited Morocco in the middle of the 19th century, "never had the sun of Africa shone on more perfect beauty [than Hachuel]". Benjamin wrote that her Arab neighbours said that "It is a sin that such a pearl should be in the possession of the Jews, and it would be a crime to leave them such a jewel."

According to Eugenio María Romero's account, Tahra Mesmudi, a devout Muslim girl and Hachuel's friend and neighbor in Tangier, falsely claimed she converted Hachuel to Islam.

Another account states that "she fell in love with a Muslim boy", who demanded her hand in marriage. The father of the boy threatened her family with bitter suffering, if they don't let her convert to Islam and marry his son. In another account, the pasha of Tangier promised to marry her if she converted to Islam. Rabbi Jacob Tolédano wrote in his 1911 book Ner ha-Ma'arav (Hebrew: נר המערב) that Lalla Solica had converted to Islam to get close to Sultan Moulay Abderrahmane of Morocco, as "she was part of his harem from 1817 to 1820". According to Tolédano, the Sultan forced her to convert to make her his favorite concubine. The Jews of Tangier, learning about this, tried to reason and dissuade her from converting. She was consequently accused of apostasy.

According to Spanish scholar Paloma Diaz-Mas, in her book "Sephardim: The Jews from Spain":

The reasons are not entirely clear, but it seems that a young Muslim who was in love with Sol and a neighbor woman, also Muslim, were involved. Both attempted to convince her to convert, but when she refused, they denounced her to the governor, who had her executed.

== Life ==
Hachuel was born in 1817 in Morocco, to Chaim and Simcha Hachuel, and had one older brother. Her father was a merchant and Talmudist. He conducted a study group in his home, which helped Sol form and maintain her own belief in Judaism. Sol's mother was a housewife.

== Arrest and execution ==
Based on an unverified claim of her conversion to Islam, Hachuel was brought to court and told to kneel before the governor. If she promised to convert, she was promised protection from her parents, silk and gold, and marriage to a handsome young man. If she did not convert, the pasha threatened her as follows:

I will load you with chains... I will have you torn (apart) piece-meal by wild beasts, you shall not see the light of day, you shall perish of hunger, and experience the rigor of my vengeance and indignation, in having provoked the anger of the Prophet.

The girl responded:

I will patiently bear the weight of your chains; I will give my limbs to be torn [apart] piece-meal by wild beasts; I will renounce forever the light of day: I will perish of hunger: and when all the evils of life are accumulated on me by your orders, I will smile at your indignation and the anger of your Prophet: since neither he nor you have been able to overcome a weak female! It is clear that Heaven is not auspicious to making proselytes to your faith.

The pasha imprisoned Sol in a windowless and lightless cell with chains around her neck, hands, and feet. Her parents appealed to the Spanish vice-consul, Don José Rico, but his efforts were unsuccessful.

The pasha sent Hachuel to Fez, where the sultan would decide her fate. The fee for her transfer (and eventual execution) was to be paid by her father, who was threatened with 500 blows of the bastinado if he did not comply. Eventually, Don José Rico paid the required sum because Sol's father could not afford it.

In Fez, the Sultan appointed the qadi to decide Sol's punishment. The Qadi summoned the Jewish sages of Fez and told them that unless Sol converted, she would be beheaded and the community punished. Although the hakhamim urged her to convert to save herself and their community, she refused. She was convicted and sentenced to death, and the qadi ruled that her father would bear the cost of her burial. The sultan's son also tried to convince her to convert to Islam for her beauty, but she refused.

Sol was beheaded in a public square in Fez. Romero described the emotions of the citizens of Fez on the day of the execution:

The Moors, whose religious fanaticism is indescribable, prepared, with their accustomed joy, to witness the horrid scene. The Jews of the city... were moved with the deepest sorrow, but they could do nothing to avert it[.]

Apparently, the sultan instructed the executioner to wound Sol first, hoping that the sight of her own blood would frighten her into accepting conversion.

The Jewish community paid for the retrieval of her corpse, her head and the bloodstained earth for a Jewish burial at the Jewish cemetery. She was declared a martyr.

The Jews called Hachuel "Sol ha-Tzaddikah" (lit. 'the righteous Sol'), and the Arabs called her Lalla Suleika (lit. 'the holy lady Suleika'). Her grave became a place of pilgrimage for both Jews and Muslims alike. Léon Godard explains the custom in his Description et histoire du Maroc:

Despite their intolerance, Moroccans, however contradictory this may appear, do in some cases honour the holy people of other religions, or beg the aid of their prayers from those whom they call infidels. In Fez, they render a kind of worship to the memory of the young Sol Hachuel, a Jew of Tangier, who died in our time of terrible torture rather than renounce the Law of Moses, or alternatively renew an abjuration previously made, by yielding to the seductions of love.

== Headstone ==
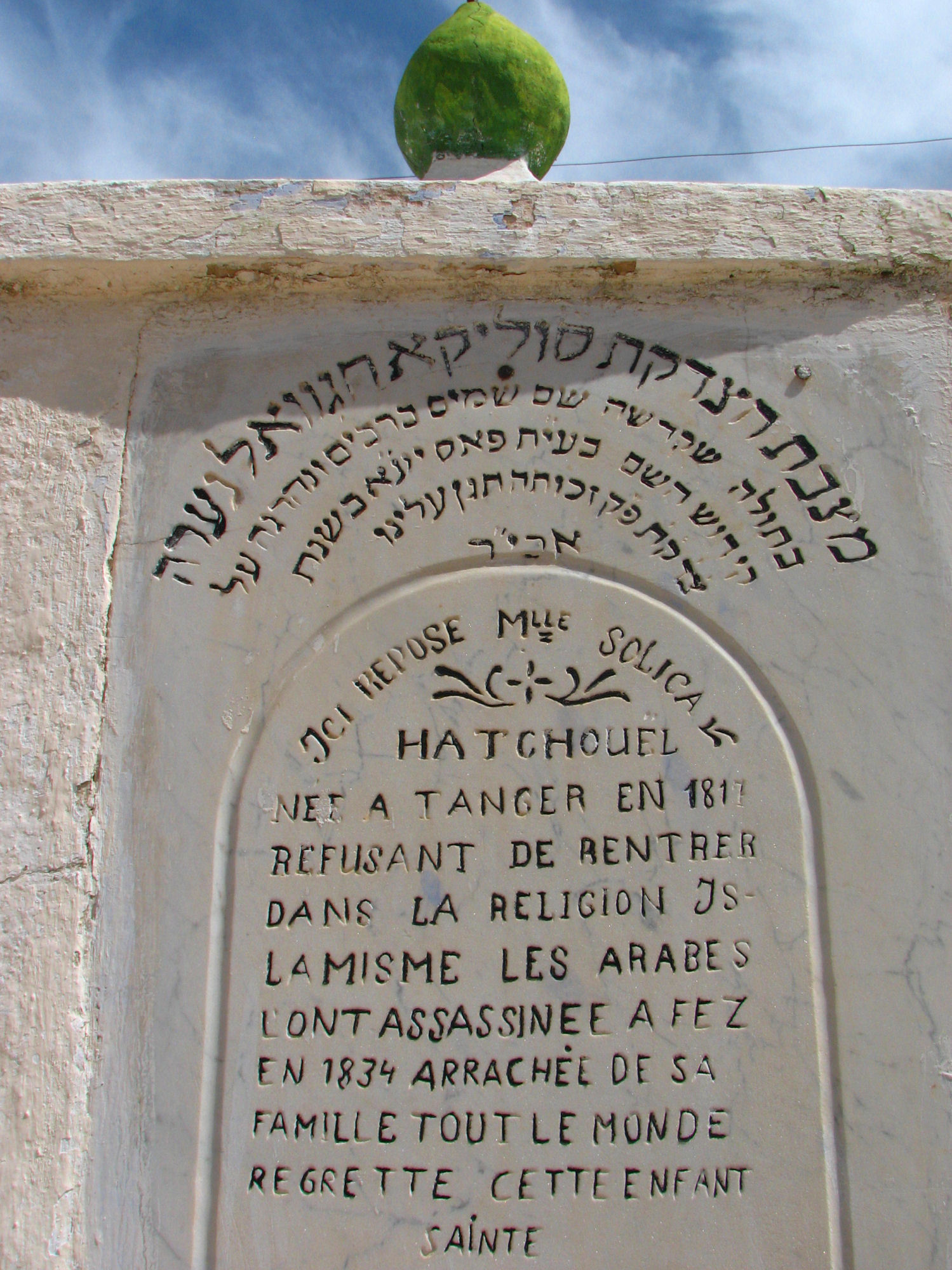
French and Hebrew inscriptions, with different messages, on the headstone of Sol Hachuel in Morocco.

Her headstone in the Jewish cemetery in Fez has inscriptions in Hebrew and French, with different messages in each language.

Translations of text on the headstone of Sol Hachuel in Jewish Cemetery in Fez
French:	Hebrew:
Here lies Miss Solica Hatchuel, born in Tangier in 1817 refusing to enter into the Islamic religion Arabs assassinated her in Fez in 1834 uprooting her from her family. The whole world regrets this saintly child.	The gravestone of the righteous Soliqa Haguel, a virgin maiden who greatly sanctified the Name of Heaven and died a martyr in the glorious city of Fez in the year 5594 (1834) [and is] buried here. May the Lord protect her. May her merit protect us. May it be God's will.

The French text emphasizes the 'evil of Islam' and her martyrdom, blaming "the Arabs" for assassinating her for refusing to convert to Islam, while the Hebrew version emphasizes her life as a virtuous martyr and role model in the "glorious city" of Fez. According to Sharon Vance, these different French and Hebrew characterizations reflect the differences of European and Jewish narratives of the story of Sol Hachuel.
