= Archangel Gabriel of Nedvědice =

Wood statue from 1495–1500 in Upper Austria

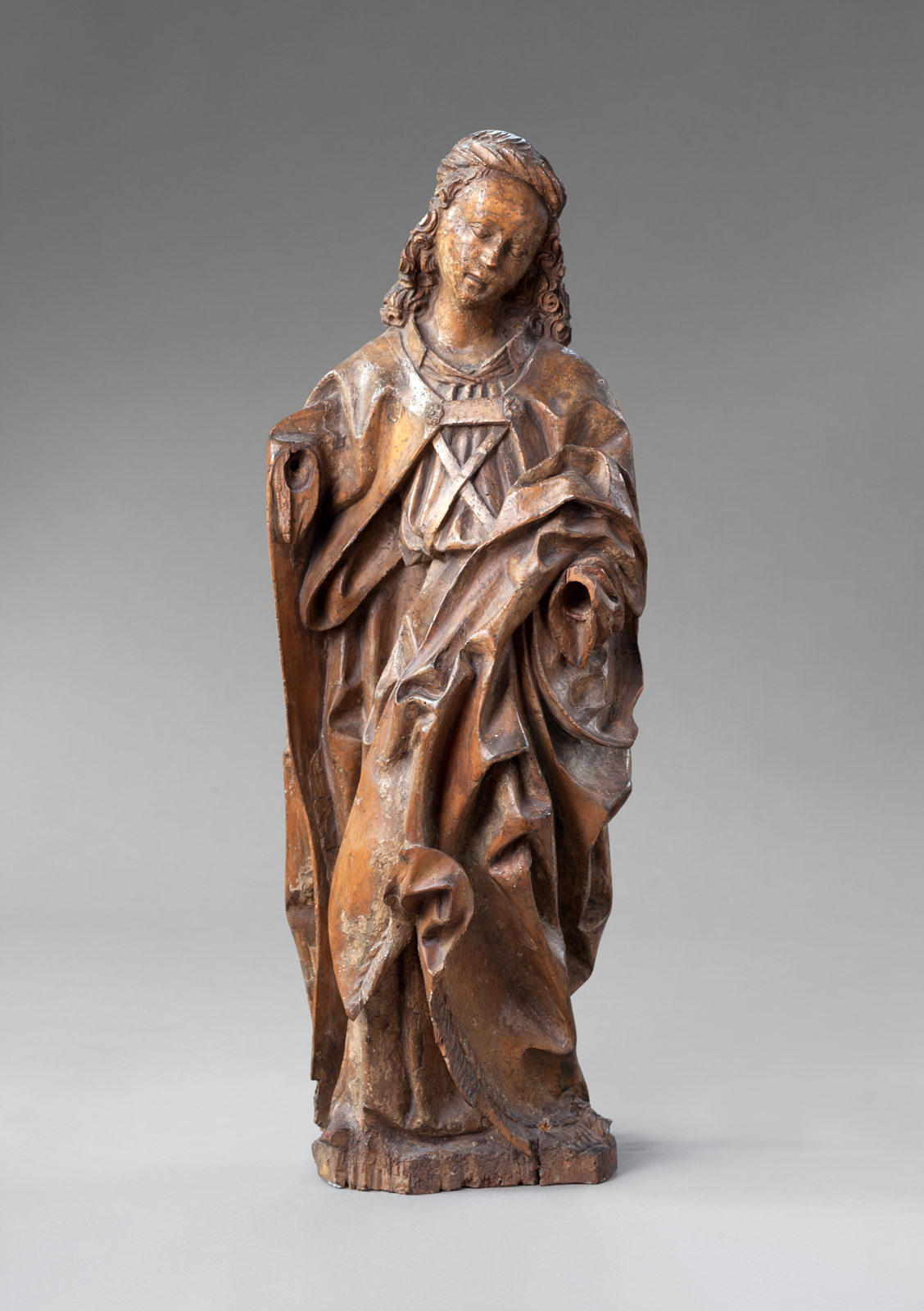
Archangel Gabriel of Nedvědice (1495-1500), Aleš South Bohemian Gallery in Hluboká nad Vltavou

The late Gothic statue of the Archangel Gabriel is an example of quality Upper Austrian carving, following the work of Nicolaus Gerhaert van Leyden. It is on display in the permanent exhibition of the Aleš South Bohemian Gallery in Hluboká nad Vltavou.

== History ==
The statue of the angel dates from 1495-1500, allegedly from Nedvědice near Soběslav. The local church of St. Nicholas is an early Gothic building from the 13th century. In the fifteenth century the village was in the possession of the Rosenbergs, later it belonged to the town of Tábor. In 1946 the statue was purchased by the Municipal Museum in České Budějovice from the private collection of J. Starhoň and in 1953 it was transferred to the collections of the Aleš South Bohemian Gallery in Hluboká nad Vltavou.

== Description and classification ==
A full statue made of linden wood, 80 cm high, designed to be viewed from all sides, with remnants of the original blue polychromy and gilding. The front part of the base is damaged, both forearms and the wings of the angel are missing. Restored by František Kotrba (1947) and Bohuslav Slánský (1956).

The figure of the standing angel turns helically and tilts his head to the left, towards the presumed kneeling or sitting statue of Mary. The statue has a finely sculpted face with long curly hair held in a curled band above the forehead. The plume, which is draped over his left arm, is accompanied by a hood with a tassel on his back. The drapery is dominated by deeply carved negative shapes, creating contrasts of light and shadow. The lower garment is undercut below the chest, with a low standing collar and a stole crossed over the breast. The forward-facing left hand, which is now missing, had a well-modelled palm and fingers. The overall concept of the sculpture developed in width and its greater slenderness and picturesqueness is characteristic of the late Gothic period around 1500. The method of opening the mass and the type of face bear features of the influence of Gerhaert van Leyden, which was probably transmitted to Bohemia by Passau.

The Archangel Gabriel was part of the Annunciation scene. The statue of the Virgin Mary, which is in the collection of the National Gallery in Prague, may have come from the same workshop, but it is impossible to determine whether it formed the counterpart of the angel statue. One of the carvers who participated in the making of the Kefermarkt altarpiece is considered to be the author. He is referred to in the literature as the Meister des Schongauer Altärchens and has been hypothetically identified with Diebold Böser, active around 1500 in Passau.

== Sources ==
- Registration sheet, inv. no. P-80, Aleš South Bohemian Gallery in Hluboká nad Vltavou
- Hynek Látal, Petra Lexová, Martin Vaněk, Meziprůzkumy, Aleš South Bohemian Gallery Collection 1300-2016, no. 9, Hluboká nad Vltavou 2016, ISBN 978-80-87799-52-9
- Roman Lavička, Gothic Art, Aleš South Bohemian Gallery 2008, pp. 38-39, ISBN 978-80-86952-57-4
- Hynek Rulíšek, Gothic Art of South Bohemia, Guide, vol. 3, Alš South Bohemia Gallery in Hluboká nad Vltavou 1989, ISBN 80-900057-6-4
- Hynek Rulíšek, Gothic Art in South Bohemia, National Gallery in Prague 1989, ISBN 80-7035-013-X
- Albert Kutal, Czech Gothic Art, Obelisk, Prague 1972
- Jaromír Homolka, in: Catalogue of Sculpture, South Bohemian Late Gothic 1450-1530, pp. 176-177, Aleš South Bohemian Gallery in Hluboká nad Vltavou 1965
- Jiří Kropáček, Contribution to the study of Czech sculpture of the last quarter of the 15th century, Journal of the National Museum CXXX, 1961
