= Alfred Dehodencq =

French Orientalist painter (1822–1882)

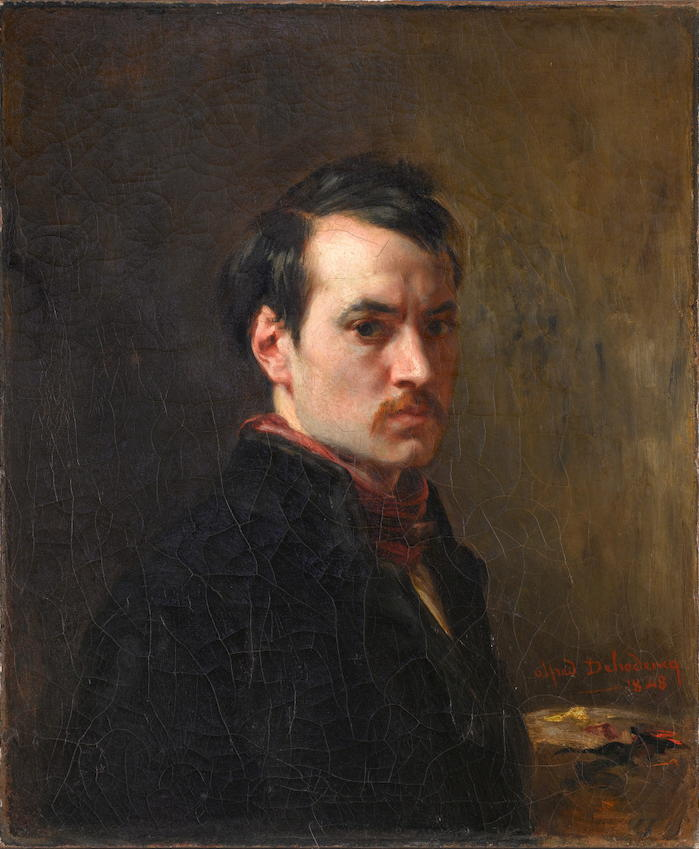
- Self portrait, 1848
- Born: Edmé-Alexis-Alfred Dehodencq; 23 April 1822; Paris, France
- Died: 2 January 1882 (aged 59); Paris, France
- Known for: Painting
- Awards: Legion of Honour

Alfred Dehodencq (23 April 1822 – 2 January 1882; born Edmé-Alexis-Alfred Dehodencq) was a French Orientalist painter known for his vivid oil paintings of Andalusian and North African scenes.

== Life ==
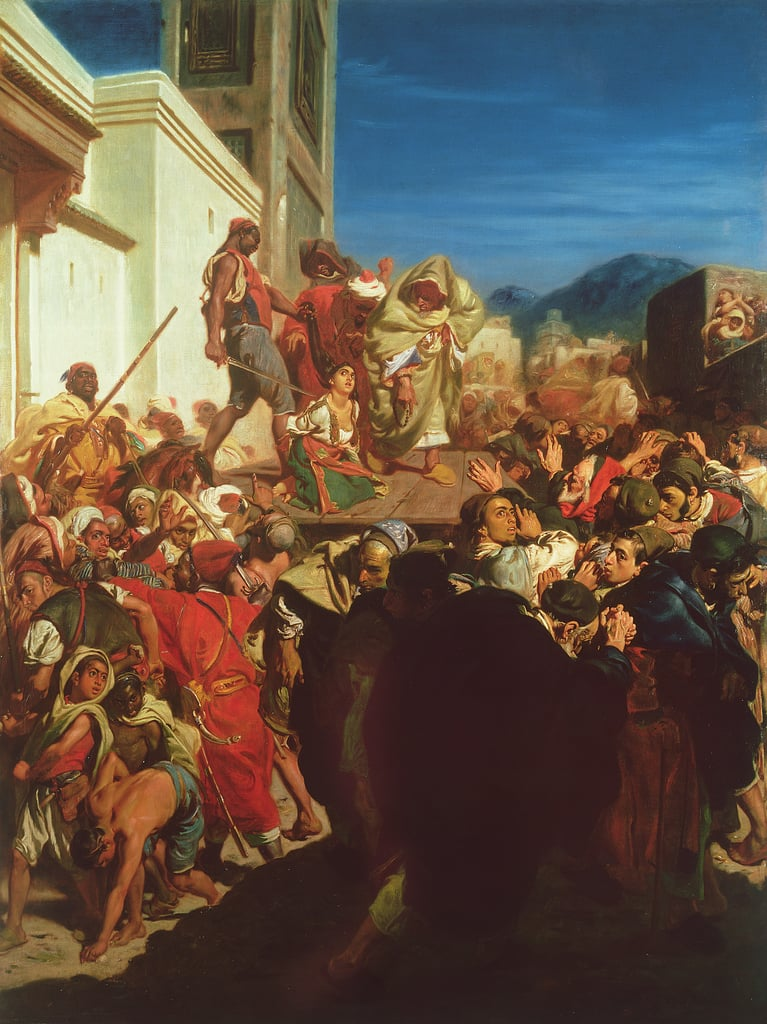
Execution of a Jewess in Morocco, c. 1861; one of several versions of this painting by the artist.

Dehodencq was born in Paris on 23 April 1822. During his early years, Dehodencq studied in Paris at the École des Beaux Arts under the tutelage of French artist Leon Cogniet. During the French Revolution of 1848 he was wounded in his right arm, and thereafter painted with his left hand. He was sent to convalesce in Spain, where he remained for five years. Dehodencq became acquainted with the works of Spanish painters Diego Velázquez and Francisco Goya, which had a strong influence on his approach to painting.

In 1853 he travelled to Morocco, where for the following ten years he produced many of his most famous paintings depicting scenes of the world he encountered. Dehodencq was the first foreign artist known to have lived in Morocco for an extended number of years. He frequently drew and painted the Jews of Morocco. His painting A Jewish Woman with her Negro Maid (1867), as well as over 30 of his drawings, are in the collection of the Israel Museum, Jerusalem. While he considered himself to be the "Last of the Romantics," his work is generally categorized with the mid-19th-century Orientalist artistic movement.

In the 1860s, Dehodencq painted multiple versions of a work depicting the public execution of a young Jewish woman in Morocco, for the crime of converting to, and then renouncing, Islam; one of these paintings was exhibited at the Paris Salon of 1861 under the title Exécution d'une juive, au Maroc. Some scholars say that Dehodencq was inspired by the story of Sol Hachuel (beheaded in 1834 in Fez), but the artist's friend and biographer, Gabriel Séailles, states explicitly, in two books, that Dehodencq was an eye-witness to the execution he depicted, which took place in Tangiers.

Dehodencq married Maria Amelia Calderon in 1857 in Cádiz, Spain. They had five children, three of whom (Emmanuel, Armand, and Marie) died as children, before their father. Their son Edmond, born in Cádiz in 1862, was called the Mozart of painting because he debuted at the Paris Salon at age eleven. At age 18 he sculpted the bust that later adorned his father's gravesite.

In 1863, after 15 years abroad, Dehodencq returned with this family to Paris. He was decorated with the Legion of Honour in 1870. He committed suicide on 2 January 1882, having been sick for a long time. He was buried in the Montmartre Cemetery.

== Selected works ==
- Bullfight, or Novillada at El Escorial, 1850, Musée des Beaux-Arts de Pau

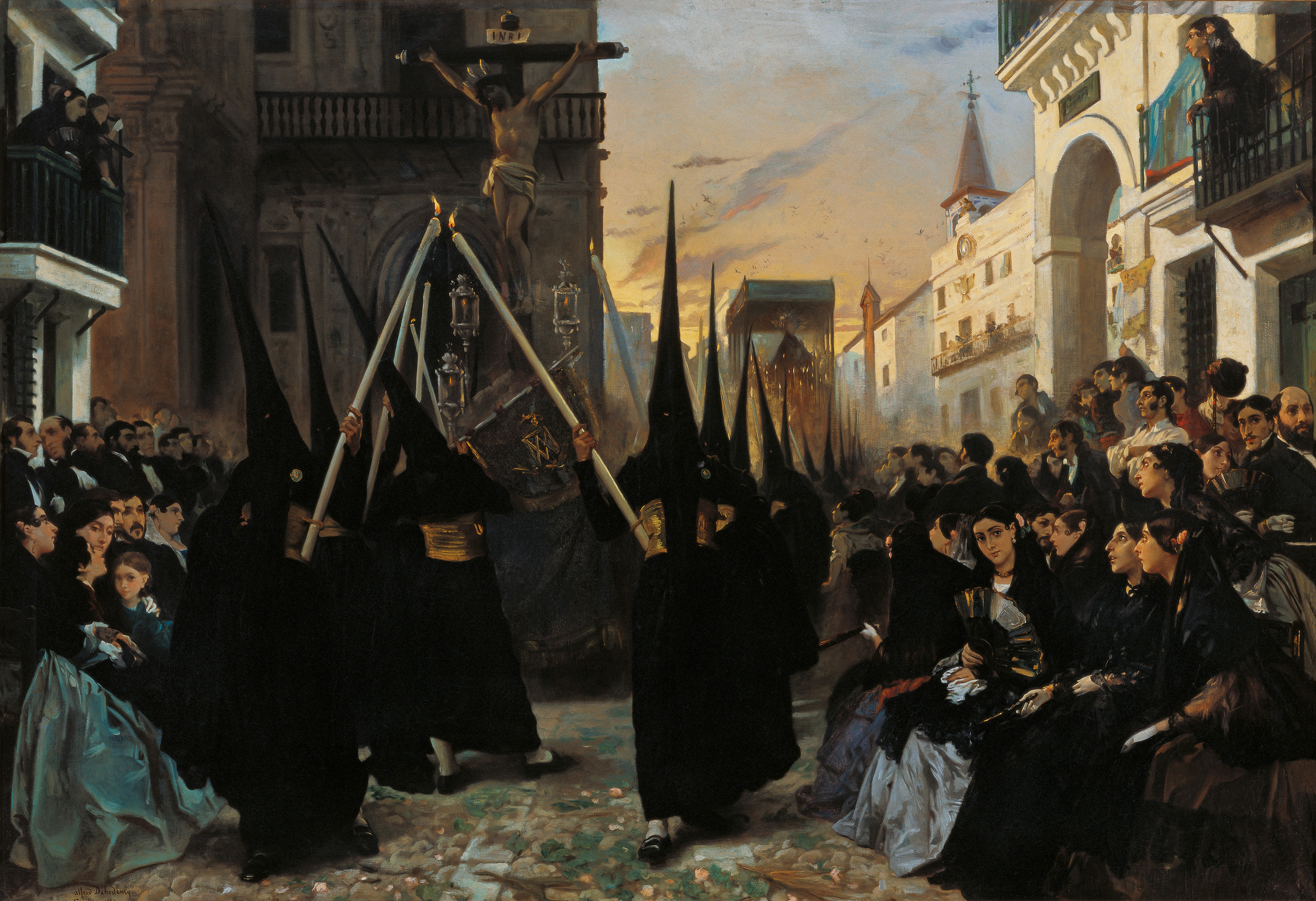
Confraternity in Procession along Calle Génova

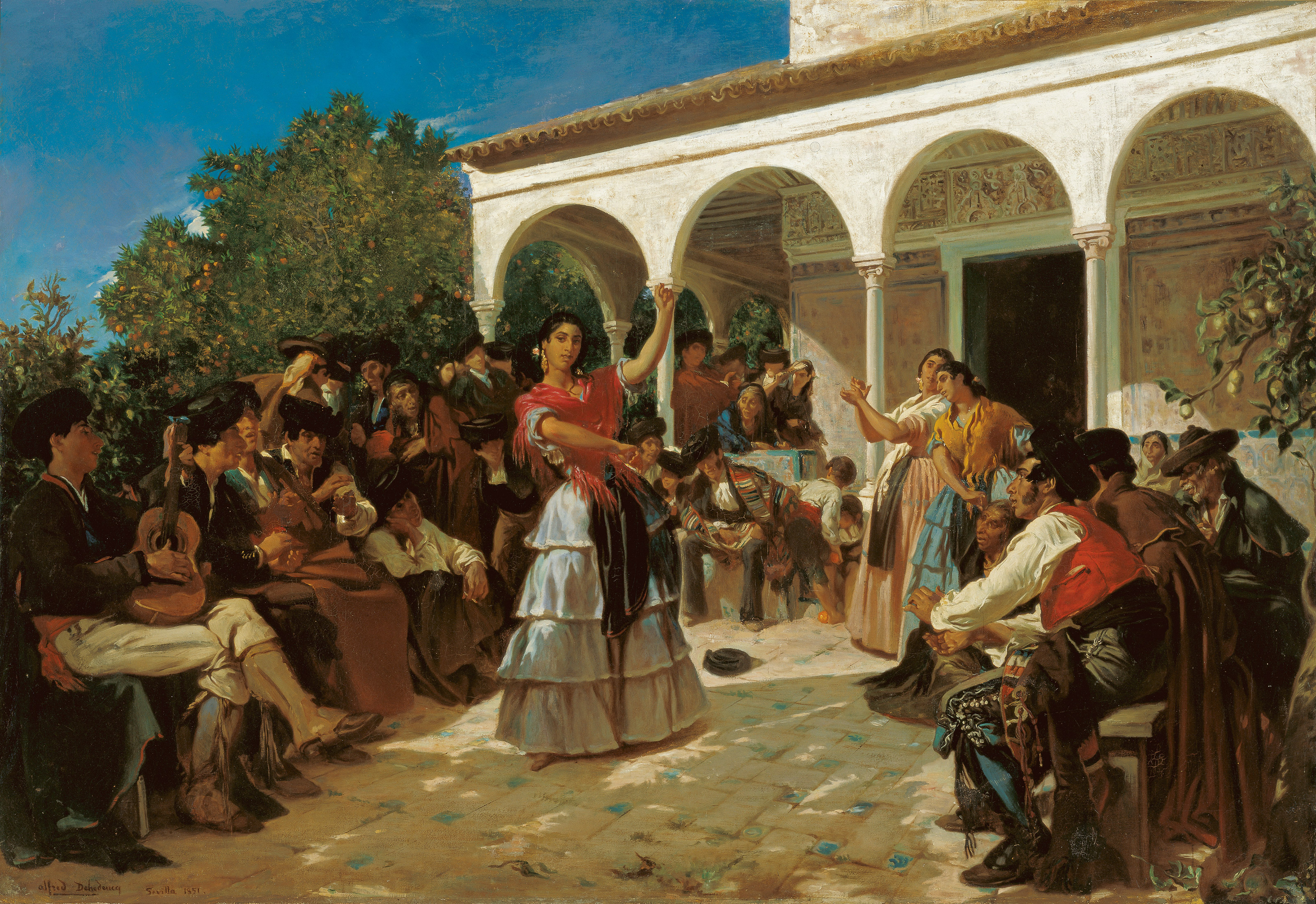
A Gypsy Dance in the Gardens of the Alcázar

- Jewish concert at the palace of the Moroccan Qaid, 1854, special collection
- The Execution of a Jewess, in Morocco, ca. 1860, Musée d'Art et d'Histoire du Judaïsme, Marais district of Paris
- The justice of the Pasha, 1866, Musée Salies, Bagnères-de-Bigorre
- Jewish bride in Morocco, 1867, Musée Saint-Denis, Reims
- Boabdil's Farewell to Granada, 1869, Musée d'Orsay, Paris
- Jewish celebration in Tanger, 1870, Musée de Poitiers
- Portrait of Mrs. Dehodencq, Musée Magnin, Dijon
- Prince Piscicelli, 1850, Musée des Beaux-Arts de Bordeaux
- Portrait de Marie au nœud rouge, 1872, special collection
- A Confraternity in Procession along Calle Génova, Carmen Thyssen Museum, Málaga
- A Gypsy Dance in the Gardens of the Alcázar, in front of Charles V Pavilion 1851, Carmen Thyssen Museum, Málaga
- Gypsies on the road, Musée d'Orsay, Paris
- Jewish bride, Palais des Beaux-Arts de Lille
- Danse of negroes in Tanger, 1874, Musée d'Orsay, Paris
- Jesus raises the daughter of Jairus, Musée Magnin, Dijon
- Paris cafe scene, National Gallery, Washington, D.C.
- Little gypsy, Baltimore Museum of Art, Baltimore
- The arrest of Charlotte Corday after the murder of Marat, July 13, 1793, Musée de la Révolution française, Vizille

== See also ==
- List of Orientalist artists
- Orientalism
