= Elizabeth Drayson =

Elizabeth Drayson (born 1954) is Lorna Close Fellow in Spanish at Murray Edwards College, University of Cambridge. She is a specialist in medieval and early modern Spanish literature and cultural history. She produced the first translation and edition of Juan Ruiz's Libro de buen amor to appear in England.

== Selected publications ==
- The Book of Good Love, Juan Ruiz, Archpriest of Hita, new English translation and critical introduction, notes and bibliography, Everyman Paperbacks, (London: Orion, 1999).
- The King and the Whore: King Roderick and La Cava, The New Middle Ages series (New York and Basingstoke: Palgrave MacMillan, 2007). Shortlisted for the La Crónica book prize 2008.
- The Lead Books of Granada, Early Modern History: Society and Culture series (New York and Basingstoke: Palgrave MacMillan, 2013).
- The Moor's Last Stand: How Seven Centuries of Muslim Rule in Spain Came to an End (London: Profile, 2017).
- Lost Paradise: The Story of Granada (London: Head of Zeus, 2021; Apollo, 2022).
