= Gabriel Séailles =

French philosopher (1852–1922)

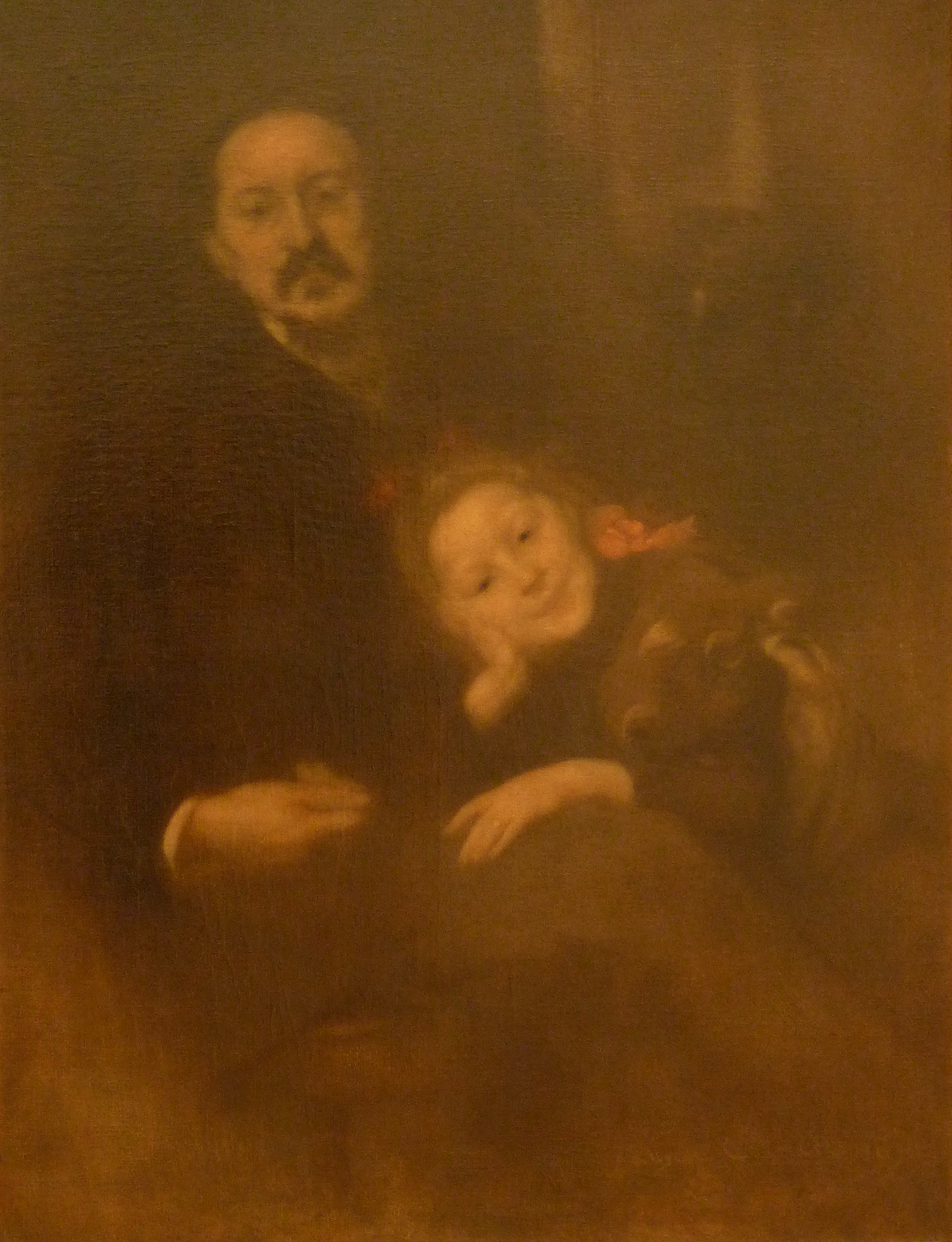
Séailles and his daughter Andrée (1893), by Eugène Carrière

Gabriel Jean Edmond Séailles (27 June 1852 – 16 September 1922) was a French philosopher.

== Life ==
Séailles was born in Paris. He studied philosophy at the École normale supérieure, then taught philosophy in a number of colleges across France before spending months together with Jules Lachelier, to attend Wilhelm Wundt's lectures about epistemology at Leipzig University.; from this experience abroad he published, besides his logbook, a paper on didactics in Germany. He defended his PhD in literature in Paris in 1884, making his debut as a philosophical writer with his book Essay on genius in art (1883) exposing a theme of his interest in the underlying principles of art. The book on the history of philosophy he wrote with Paul Janet, Les problèmes et les écoles, was published in 1887. Janet was the Sorbonne's Professor of Philosophy and in time Séailles became Janet's successor.

In 1892 he wrote a book about Leonardo da Vinci as a polymath and in 1901 he published a book on Watteau.

== Works ==
- Les Affirmations de la conscience moderne, 1903.
- Éducation ou Révolution, 1904.
- La Philosophie de C. Renouvier
- La question juive en Pologne - Enquête, 1916

== Bibliography ==
- Christophe Charle, Les professeurs de la faculté des lettres de Paris. Paris, CNRS, 1985–1986. 2 vols.
