= The Surrender of Granada =

1882 painting by Francisco Pradilla Ortiz

La rendición de Granada
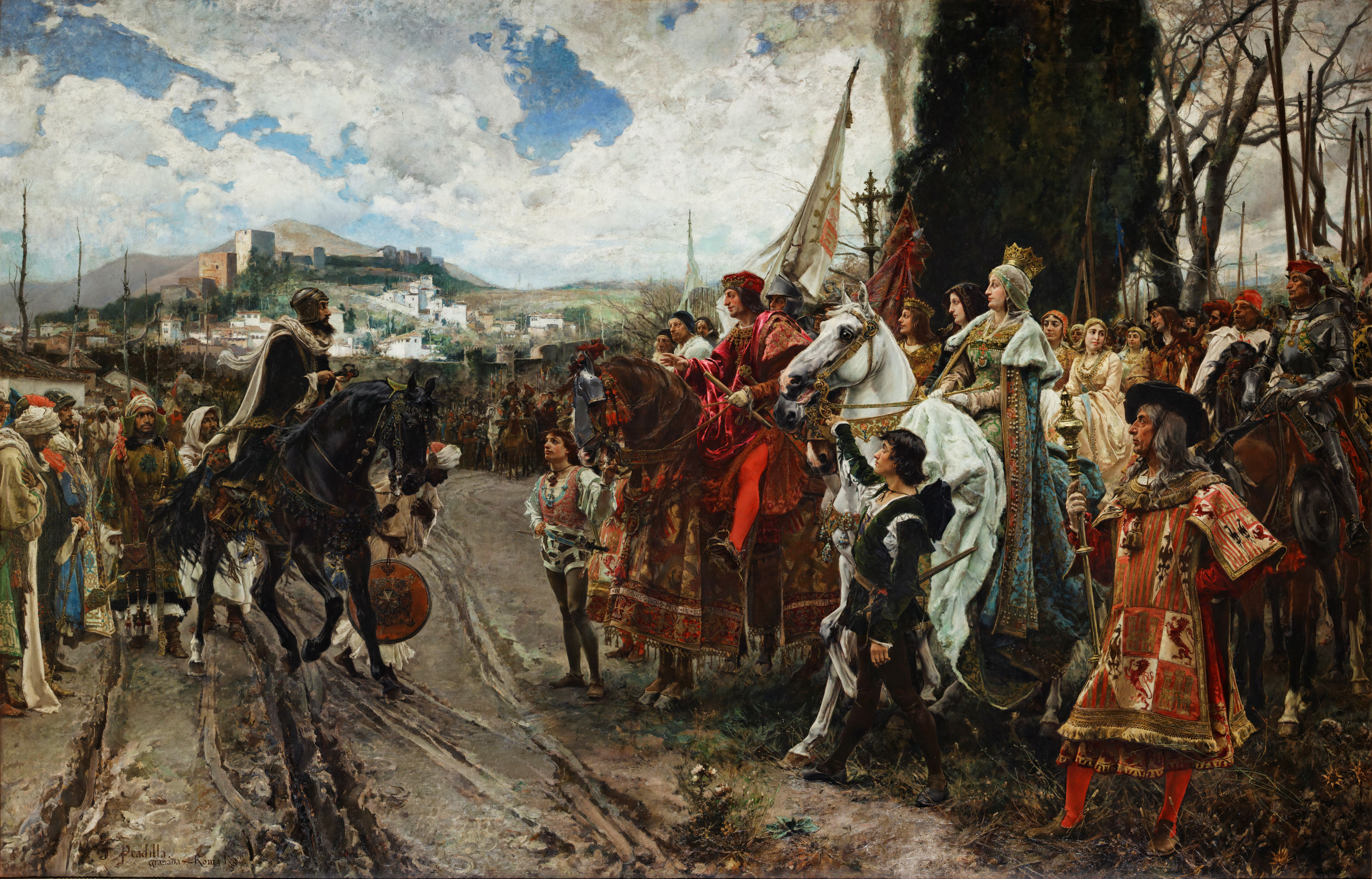
- Artist: Francisco Pradilla Ortiz
- Year: 1882
- Medium: Oil on canvas
- Dimensions: 330 cm × 550 cm (130 in × 220 in)
- Location: Palacio del Senado; Madrid

La rendición de Granada (English:The Surrender of Granada) is a work by the Spanish painter Francisco Pradilla Ortiz completed in 1882, which is located in the Conference Room or Salón de los Pasos Perdidos of the Spanish Senate Palace.

This large (3.3 meters high by 5.5 meters wide) oil on canvas depicts the surrender of Boabdil, last ruler of the Emirate of Granada, to Ferdinand of Aragon and Isabella of Castille on 2 January 1492, thus marking the end of the Reconquista.

== Commission ==
Pradilla was commissioned by the Senate to produce this work following the success of his painting Doña Joanna the Mad, which had won medals of honor at both the National Exhibition of Fine Arts of 1878 and the Spanish section of the Universal Exposition in Paris that same year.

It was commissioned to reproduce the capture of Granada by the Catholic Monarchs at the end of the Reconquista, an event that was to be seen as a "representation of Spanish unity" and "a starting point for the great deeds carried out by our grandparents under those glorious sovereigns", according to the indications of the then president of the institution, Marquis Manuel García Barzanallana. The canvas was to be installed in the Senate Conference Room, which was planned to be decorated with paintings and statues of prominent figures in Spanish history.

The result was not as successful as Doña Joanna the Mad, and it did not participate in any national exhibition. However, it was one of Pradilla's greatest professional successes and its wide public acclaim brought him fame beyond the borders of Spain. It was first presented in Rome, where Pradilla was heading the Spanish Academy, and later in the Senate, where Alfonso XII went to see the work.

After the painting was completed Alfonso XII awarded Pradilla the Grand Cross of the Order of Isabella the Catholic and the Senate paid the painter 50,000 pesetas, double the amount initially agreed upon.

== The painting ==
The picture shows the handing over of the keys of the city of Granada by Emir Muhammad XI (Boabdil) of Granada to the Catholic Monarchs of Spain, Isabella and Ferdinand on 2 January 1492.

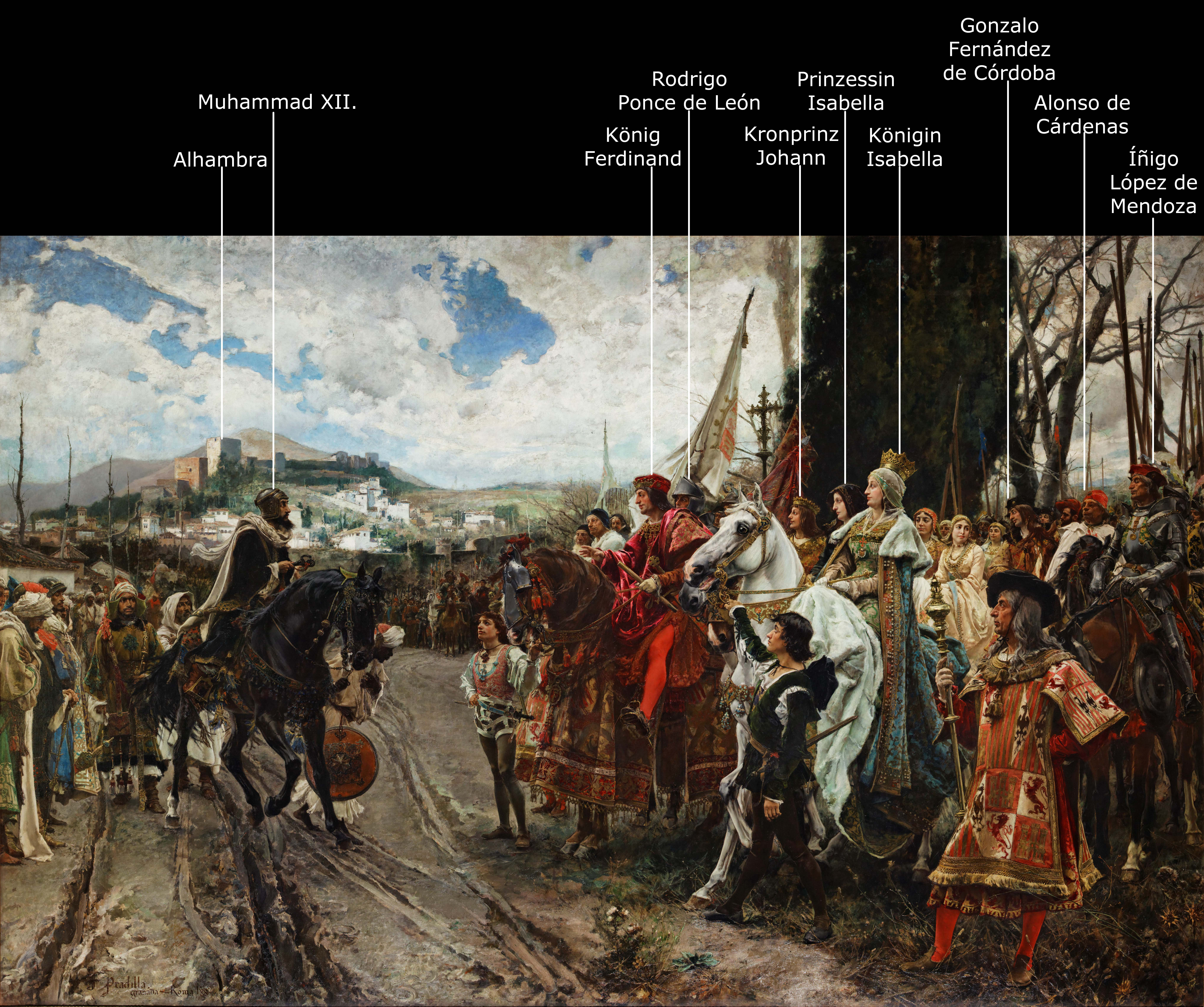
Characters depicted in the painting.

The group of Christian conquerors is depicted on the right side of the painting, as seen from the viewer. A gap appears slightly to the left of center, separating the Christian Kings from the conquered Muslims. This separation is reinforced by a wheel track visible on the path. This also emphasizes perspective.

Due to her position in the foreground and the light colors of her clothing, which stand out starkly against the dark background consisting of cypresses at this point and the white of her white horse, the figure of the queen draws the eye. She is dressed in a light green and gold brocade dress and wears a light blue brocade cloak with a white ermine collar. The queen's crown is identical to the one still kept in Granada today.

King Ferdinand is depicted with almost no overlap. He is dressed entirely in red. He wears a Venetian cloak of red velvet, red stockings, and a red cap connected to a crown. He has opened his right hand to receive the keys. Between the royal couple, one can recognize their two eldest children. Crown Prince John of Aragon and Castile wears a crown. The husband of the Infanta Isabella of Aragon and Castile, the Infante Alfonso of Portugal, had died on 13 July 1491. She is therefore wearing black mourning clothes. On the right, behind the queen, one can see some ladies of the court and people who played a role in the conquest of the kingdom of Granada.

The group of the emir and his entourage is shown a bit further back in perspective. This results in these people appearing to be smaller. Emir Muhammad XI is dressed in black, riding a black horse led by a black servant. He holds the keys to the city in his right hand. His entourage is not mounted, but appears to be still carrying weapons.

In the background of the picture one can see a city wall, white buildings, and on the mountain the castle Alhambra.

== See also ==
- The Sigh of the Moor
