= Spanish Academy in Rome =

Cultural institution in Rome (e. 1873)

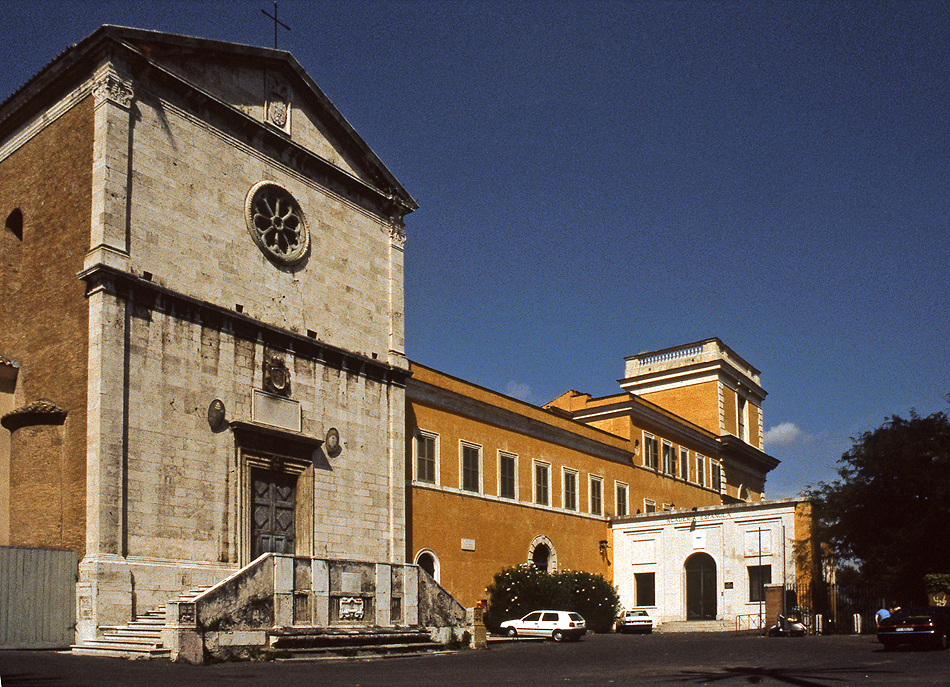
- The Tempietto de Bramante (left) next to the Academy
- Established: 1873
- Location: Rome, Italy
- Coordinates: 41°53′20″N 12°28′00″E
- Type: Cultural institution
- Director: María Ángeles Albert de León
- Website: Official website

The Spanish Academy in Rome (Spanish: Real Academia de España en Roma) is a cultural institution created in 1873 under the Spanish Ministry of Foreign Affairs.

The academy's headquarters are in the cloister of the former monastery of San Pietro in Montorio, built on the Janiculum hill at the behest of Isabella of Castile and Ferdinand II of Aragon, the Catholic Monarchs, between 1481 and 1500.

The convent is part of the Trastevere district and the Tempietto de Bramante, which is part of the complex, is undoubtedly its most famous architectural work.

== History ==
The academy was created at the initiative of politician and man of letters Emilio Castelar.

The headquarters at the former convent of San Pietro in Montorio was inaugurated in 1881, during the reign of Alfonso XII, when its director was José Casado del Alisal, who had succeeded the first director, the famous painter Eduardo Rosales (who had never occupied the position due to poor health). The convent had been abandoned shortly after the capture of Rome and recognized as a Spanish government property: Spain already claimed ownership for its foundation, and the Italian state had already begun the recognition of this right during the brief reign of Amedeo I of Spain (son of Victor Emmanuel II and founder of the Savoy-Aosta branch) although the final cession was not until 1876.

It was during his tenure at the academy that Francisco Padilla painted The Surrender of Granada (1882), and generally speaking the institution was often directed by famous artists, historians, and writers such as Vicente Palmaroli, Mariano Benlliure, Ramón María del Valle-Inclán, and Antonio Blanco Freijeiro, among others.

Many well-known Spanish figures from different fields have studied at the academy. Among them were Heliodoro Guillén Pedemonti, Dióscoro Puebla, Marceliano Santa María, Tomás García Sampedro, Joaquín Sorolla, Joaquín Valverde Lasarte, Pritzker award winner Rafael Moneo, Luis Moreno Mansilla, Jesús Aparicio, Juan Francisco Casas, Antonio Zarco, Daniel Canogar, Sergio Belinchón, Antón García Abril, Germán Gómez González, Naia del Castillo, Juan Olivares, Guillermo Pérez Villalta, Manuel Sáez, Enrique Simonet, Juan Navarro Baldeweg, Ignacio Pinazo, Francisco Pradilla, Carmelo Pastor, José Moreno Carbonero, Eduardo Valderrey, Miguel Villarino, Moisés de Huerta, and José Benlliure y Gil.

== See also ==
- Spanish Academy of Fine Arts in Rome, also founded in 1873.
- Spanish School of Archaeology and History in Rome, established in 1910.
