= Philip the Handsome =

Habsburg ruler, King of Castile in 1506

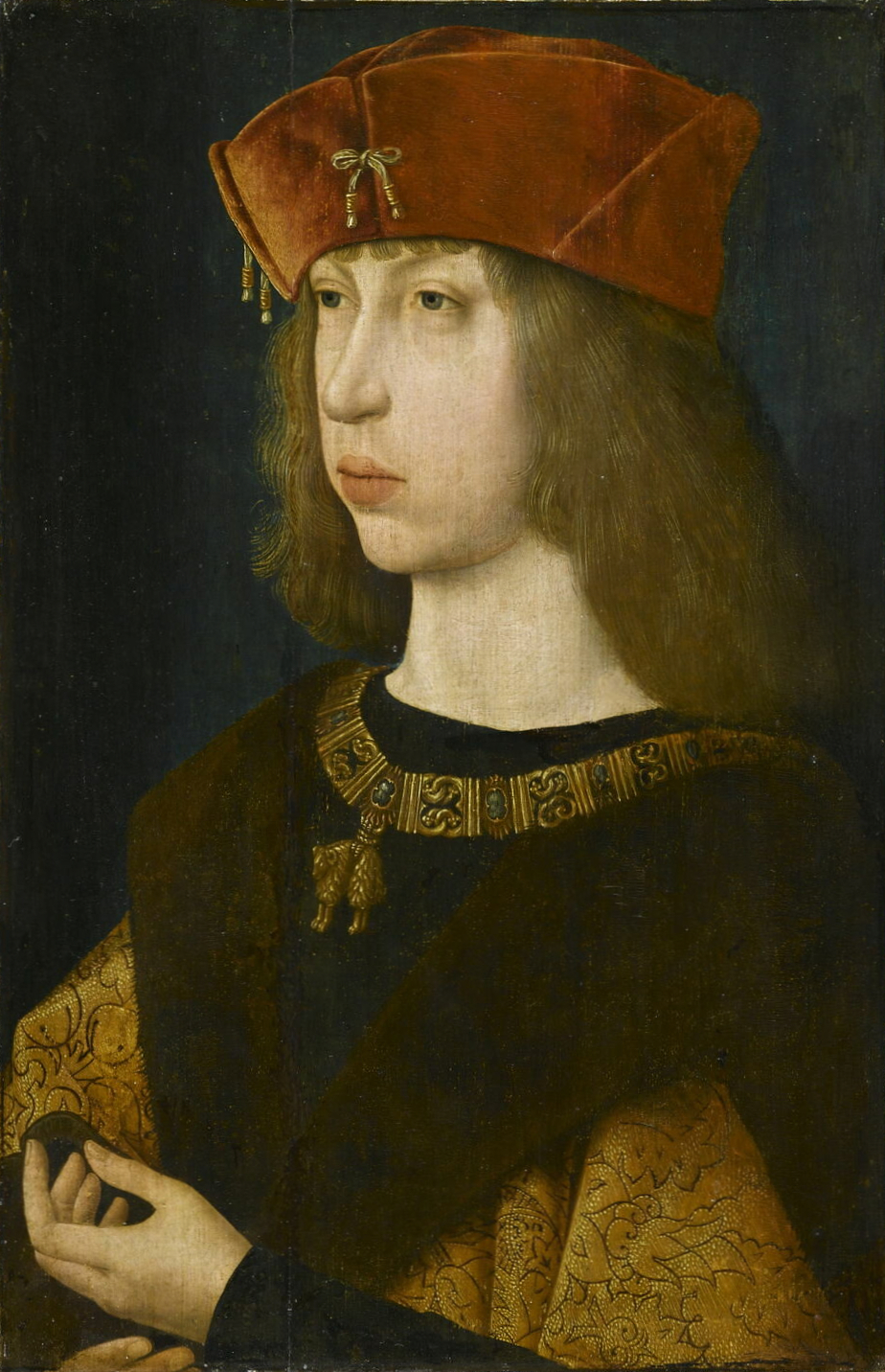
- Portrait by the Master of the Legend of the Magdalen, 1500

King of Castile and León (jure uxoris) (as Philip I)
- Reign: 12 July – 25 September 1506
- Proclamation: 12 July 1506
- Predecessor: Joanna I
- Successor: Joanna I
- Co-monarch: Joanna I

Lord of the Netherlands (ruler of the Habsburg Netherlands)
- Reign: 27 March 1482 – 25 September 1506
- Predecessor: Mary and Maximilian I
- Successor: Charles II
- Regent and governors: See list: Maximilian of Austria (regent, 1482–1494); Margaret of York (1489–1493); Engelbert II, Count of Nassau-Breda (1501–1504); William de Croÿ (1504–1506)

Count of Artois, Burgundy, and Charolais (claim since 1482, effectively since 1493)
- Reign: 23 May 1493 – 25 September 1506
- Predecessor: Charles VIII of France
- Successor: Charles II
- Born: 22 June/July 1478; Bruges, Flanders, Burgundian Netherlands
- Died: 25 September 1506 (aged 28); Burgos, Castile, Spain
- Burial: Royal Chapel of Granada
- Spouse: Joanna, Queen of Castile and Aragon (m. 1496)
- Issue: Eleanor, Queen of Portugal and France; Charles V, Holy Roman Emperor; Isabella, Queen of Denmark, Norway and Sweden; Ferdinand I, Holy Roman Emperor; Mary, Queen of Hungary; Catherine, Queen of Portugal
- House: Habsburg
- Father: Maximilian I, Holy Roman Emperor
- Mother: Mary of Burgundy
- Religion: Catholic Church

Philip the Handsome (Note: Dutch: Filips, Spanish: Felipe, French: Philippe, German: Philipp) (22 June/July 1478 – 25 September 1506), also called Philip the Fair, was ruler of the Habsburg Netherlands from 1482, including the counties of Artois, Burgundy and Charolais from 1493, and the first king of Castile from the House of Habsburg in 1506.

Philip was the son of Maximilian I of Austria and Mary of Burgundy. Maximilian was a prince of the House of Habsburg who became Holy Roman emperor. Mary was the daughter of Charles the Bold and heiress of the wealthy and extensive complex of domains that made up Valois Burgundy, including the Burgundian Netherlands. In 1482, at the age of three, Philip's mother died and he inherited her titles and domains. As a result, he became the first Habsburg ruler of the Netherlands. Although his inheritance was, in part, challenged by the French king Louis XI, it was largely confirmed by the Treaty of Arras (1482) and the Treaty of Senlis (1493). Despite his young age, Philip quickly proved himself an effective ruler beloved by his people in the Low Countries, pursuing policies that favored peace and economic development, while maintaining a steady course of the government building.

In 1496, Philip's father arranged for him to marry Joanna, the second daughter of Queen Isabella I of Castile and King Ferdinand II of Aragon. Around the same time, Philip's sister, Margaret, was given in marriage to Joanna's brother John, Prince of Asturias. After the deaths of her brother John, sister Isabella, and nephew Miguel, Joanna became heir presumptive to the thrones of Castile and Aragon. Most of Philip's time in Spain was spent consolidating his power, often leading to conflicts with his wife and her father. Joanna became queen of Castile when her mother died in 1504. Philip was proclaimed king in 1506, but died a few months later, leaving his wife distraught with grief. Joanna's father, Ferdinand II of Aragon, and son, Charles, were quick to seize power, confining the queen for the rest of her life on account of her alleged insanity.

Philip died before his father, and therefore never inherited his father's territories or became emperor. However, his son Charles eventually united the Habsburg, Burgundian, Castilian, and Aragonese inheritances. By inheriting the Burgundian Netherlands and acquiring much of Spain and its possessions in the New World by marriage to Joanna, Philip was instrumental in greatly enhancing the territories of the Habsburgs, and his progeny would rule over vast European territories for the next five centuries.

== Early life ==
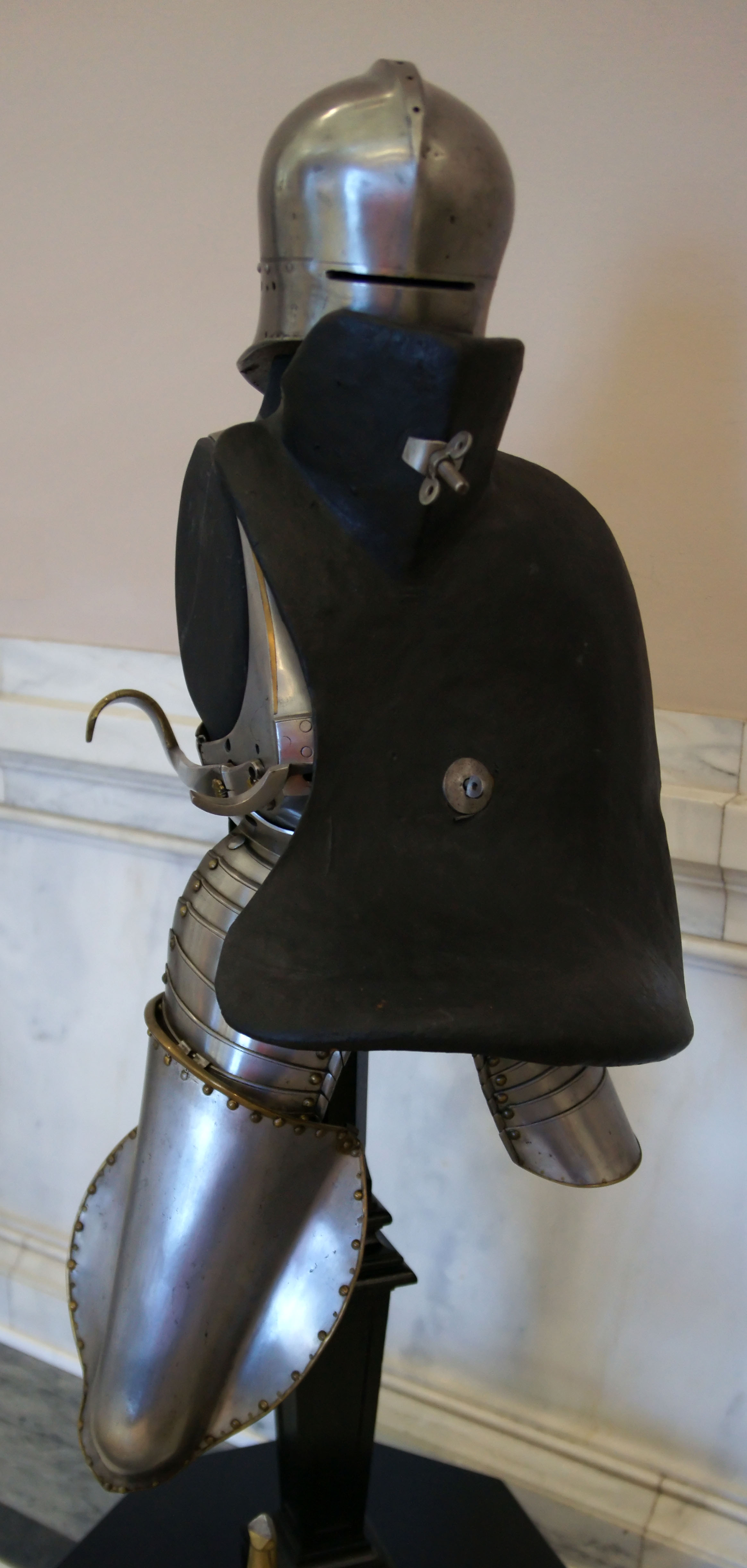
Boy's racing armour belonging to Philip, made around 1490 by unknown armourer from Southern Germany

Philip was born in Bruges on 22 June/July 1478, the son of Maximilian I of Austria and Mary of Burgundy. (Note: Some secondary sources reference both dates. However, in his biography of Philip, Jean-Marie Cauchies refers only to the June date. He uses as evidence a letter dated 23 June 1478 that was sent by Mary's physicians to inform Maximilian of the birth the day before. Cauchies also refers to the baptism a week later, on 29 June. Steven Thiry shows that official court historiographer Jean Molinet supports the June date.) He was born in the County of Flanders (today in Belgium) during the reign of his grandfather Holy Roman Emperor Frederick III. His father Maxmillian was only 19 at the time of Philip's birth. When Philip was born, King Louis XI of France, the chief opponent of his parents, spread the rumour that the child was actually a girl, not a boy. When Philip's baptism was organized, his step-grandmother Margaret of York showed the boy naked to the populace, so that any doubt about the child's sex would disappear. The child was named in honour of his maternal great-grandfather, Philip the Good, paternal grandfather of his mother Mary. In his first presentation to the father, the parents expressed double dynastic pride. Mary said: “Sir, look at your son and our child, young Philip of imperial seed.” Maximilian kissed the baby, and replied, “O noble Burgundian blood, my offspring, named after Philip of Valois.”

Philip was only four years old when his mother died from a horse accident in March 1482, resulting in him succeeding all of her titles, and effective possessions in the Burgundian Netherlands, under the guardianship of his father. Already in December 1482, the Treaty of Arras was concluded with the king Louis XI of France, that secured Philip's rule over much of the Low Countries, but also left the Duchy of Burgundy in French possession, and additionally defined the counties of Artois, Burgundy and Charolais as the dowry of Philip's sister Archduchess Margaret of Austria, who was engaged to the French prince.

A period of turmoil ensued which witnessed sporadic hostilities between, principally, the large towns of Flanders (especially Ghent and Bruges) and the supporters of Maximilian. Philip became caught up in events and his custody was taken away by a council appointed by the Netherlandish Estates as part of the larger Flemish campaign to support their claims of greater autonomy, which they had wrested from Mary of Burgundy in an agreement known as the Great Privilege of 1477. It was only in the summer of 1485 that Maximilian, marching into Ghent with German troops and forcing its leader Jan Coppenhole to flee, could embrace his son again. Young Philip was then brought to Mechelen and delivered to the loving care of Margaret of York.

By 1492, the rebellions were completely suppressed. Maximilian revoked the Great Privilege and established a strong ducal monarchy, undisturbed by particularism. But he would not reintroduce Charles the Bold's centralizing ordinances. Since 1489 (after his departure), the government under Albert III, Duke of Saxony, had made more efforts in consulting representative institutions and showed more restraint in subjugating recalcitrant territories. Notables who had previously supported rebellions returned to city administrations. The Estates General continued to develop as a regular meeting place of the central government. By the time Maximilian handed over the government to Philip, Habsburg rule was a matter of fact.

Despite tumultuous political conditions, the early death of Philip's mother as well as the separation from his father and sister, Philip's young life did not lack luxuries. He was educated for the needs of a person of his social class. He became accomplished in archery, tennis, stick fighting, and hunting. He also proved a valiant knight, like his father. He was a good dancer and conversationalist. He also inherited his parents' passion for music; although, this boisterousness would not manifest in his manners as a politician.

Constant campaigning caused Maximilian, the father, to be absent from the young Philip's life (he returned to battles only two months after Philip's birth). Later, emotional problems made Maximilian try to avoid returning to the Netherlands, and he would miss both the 1494 inauguration and 1496 wedding of his son. Philip's tutors since arriving at Mechelen were Olivier de la Marche and François de Busleyden, who would later be his chancellor in Flanders.

== Ruler of Habsburg Netherlands and Habsburg Burgundy ==
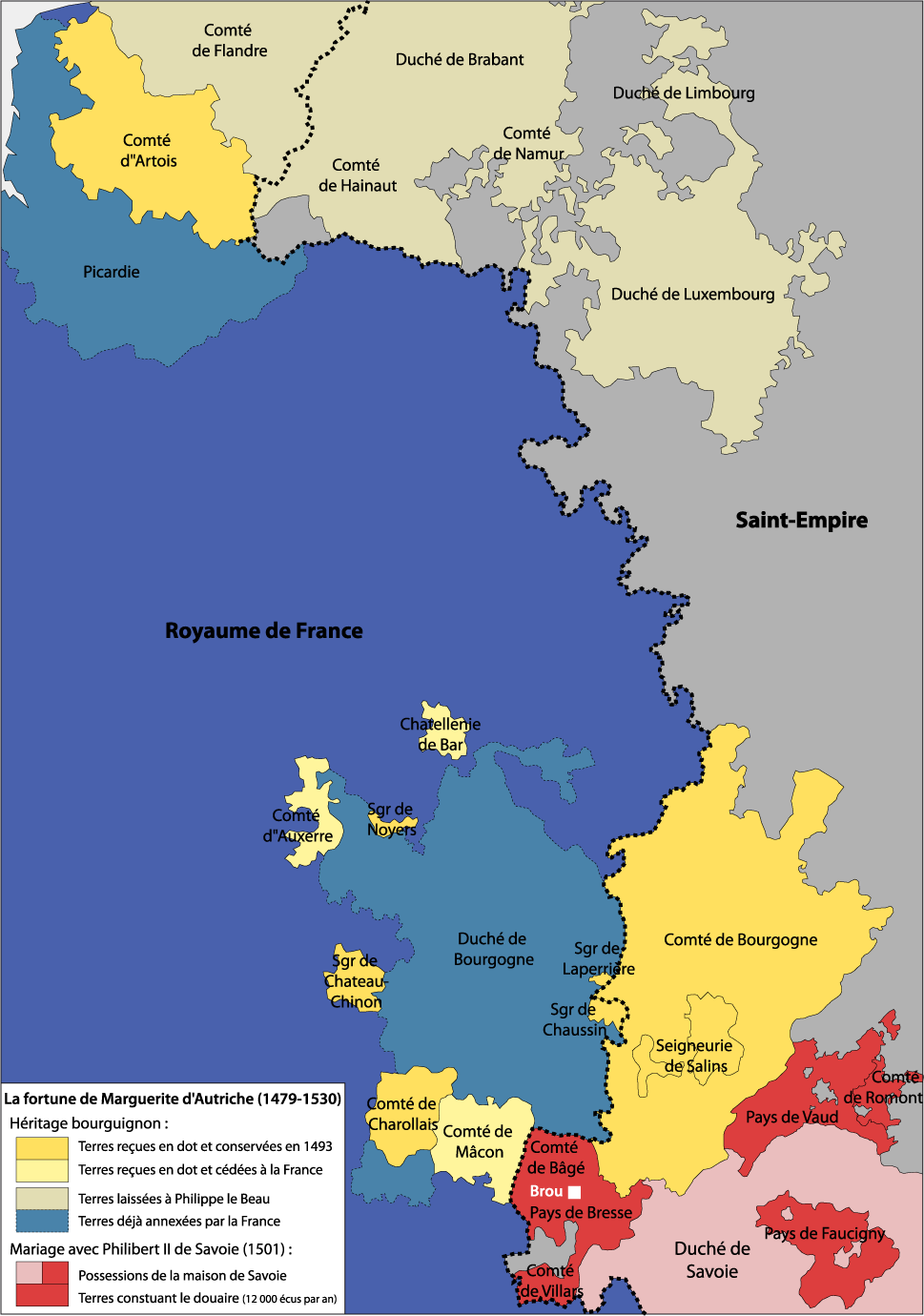
Philip's sister Margaret's dowry, as defined in 1482 by the Treaty of Arras, and redistributed in 1493 by the Treaty of Senlis

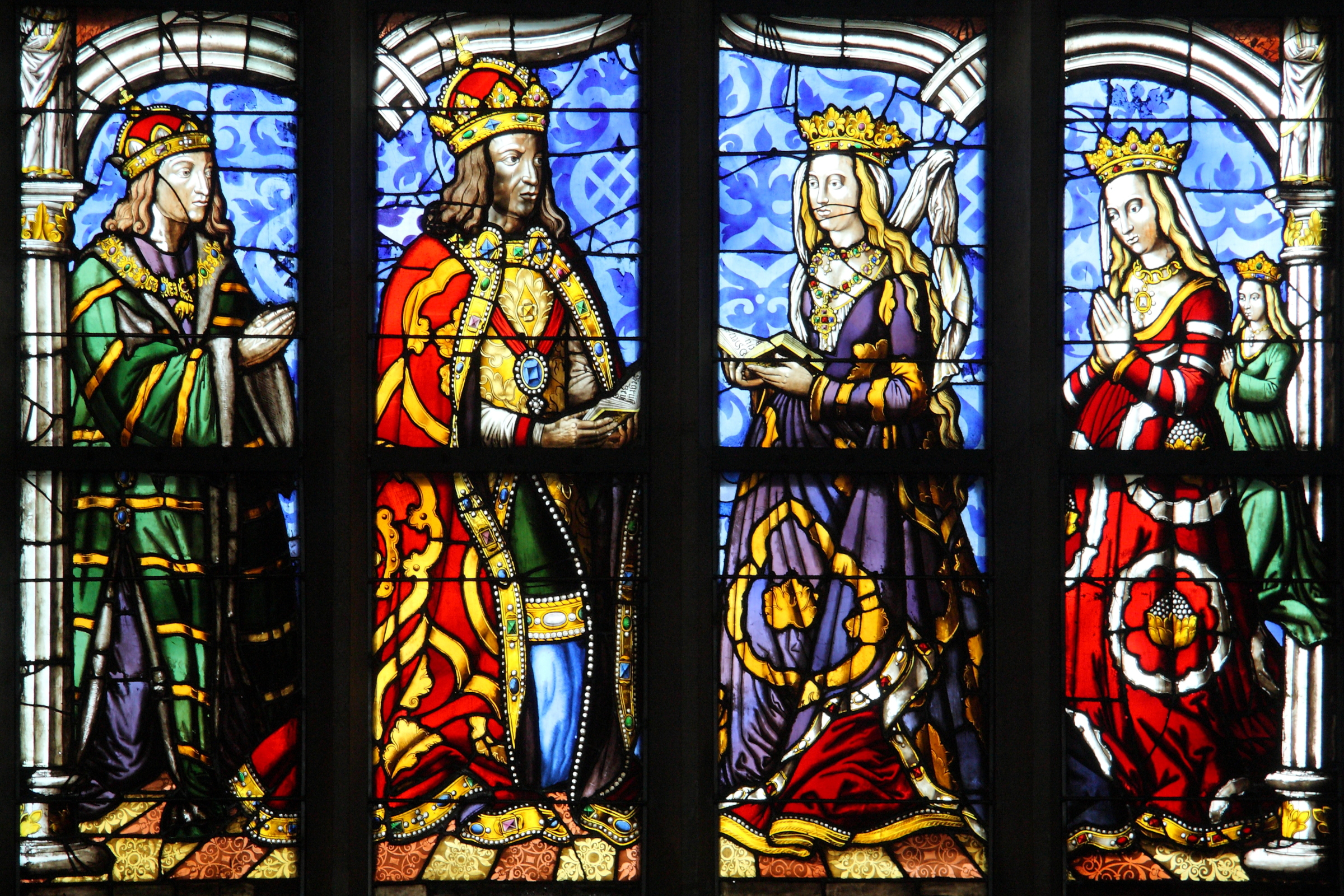
16th century stained glass window in St George's Church (Georgskapelle): Philip the Handsome, Maximilian I, Bianca Maria Sforza, Mary of Burgundy with Archduchess Margaret (left to right)

In 1493, the Treaty of Senlis was concluded with the king Charles VIII of France, expanding Philip's effective rule to the counties of Artois, Burgundy and Charolais. In the same year, his grandfather, emperor Frederick III died, thus Philip's father Maximilian I became the new ruler of the Holy Roman Empire. Burdened with his new responsibilities and personally exasperated by his relationship with the Burgundian lands, he decided to transfer power to the 15-year-old Philip. The news was welcomed by Burgundian lands, as the new ruler was native-born, spoke the language, was peace-loving and trusted his advisors, while Maximilian was warlike and did not respect the Great Privilege. From this year, Philip was in control of the government. As King of the Romans, Maximilian did not accept homage from Philip though, a signal that he intended to exercise direct control over the lands. His defeated subjects were too exhausted to resist.

At his inauguration in 1494, one of Philip the Fair's first administrative acts was the abolition of the Great Privilege. He swore to maintaining only the privileges granted at the time of Philip the Good. As during the revolts, many of the rebels had claimed Philip as their rightful and natural prince (as opposed to his father), Philip capitalized on this to restore several of his great-grandfather and grandfather's centralizing policies, while abandoning their expansionism.

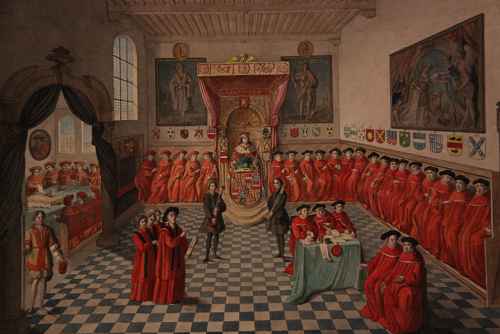
Archduke Philip opening a session (1504) of the Great Council of Mechelen

Philip was an inexperienced ruler and had a reputation for accommodating and trusting advisors, but also had a backbone. Philip freed himself from his father's control. Although Busleyden was temporarily disgraced when Maximilian summoned his son in 1496 to Germany, he was soon restored. In 1497, Philip replaced Jean Carondelet, the chancellor Maximilian had appointed, with Thomas de Plaine, who was devoted to his interests. His pursuit of peace with France frustrated Maximilian, who was waging war against Charles VIII of France. Philip reconciled the regionalism represented by the Great Privilege with the harsh centralization the country had experienced under Charles the Bold, softening the rigorous demands of both sides while giving in to neither. He reimposed the Parliament of Mechelen (renamed as the Great Council, which was placed in Mechelen in December 1501 – de jure from 1504) and reclaimed royal domains. He placated France while reopening the trade route with England in the Magnus Intercursus. His policies gained him the love of the country. Patricia Carson opines, though, that it was clear from the beginning that this was not meant to last, as Philip would never be able to focus on Burgundian lands forever. He was the heir of his father as Holy Roman Emperor. What the Low Countries could not have foreseen, was that Philip would one day claim the throne in Spain as well, as the husband of Joanna.

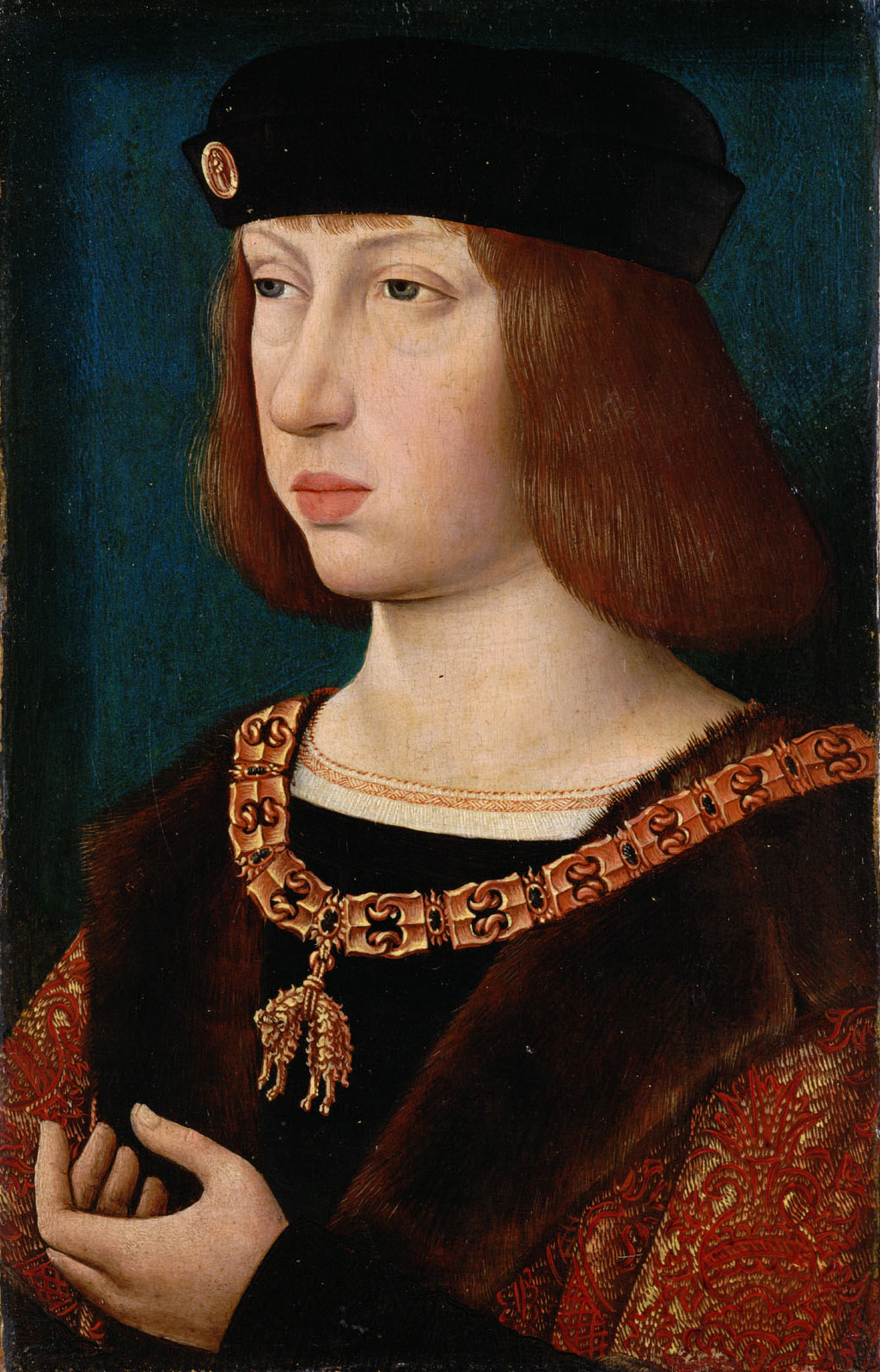
Philip by the Master of the Legend of the Magdalen

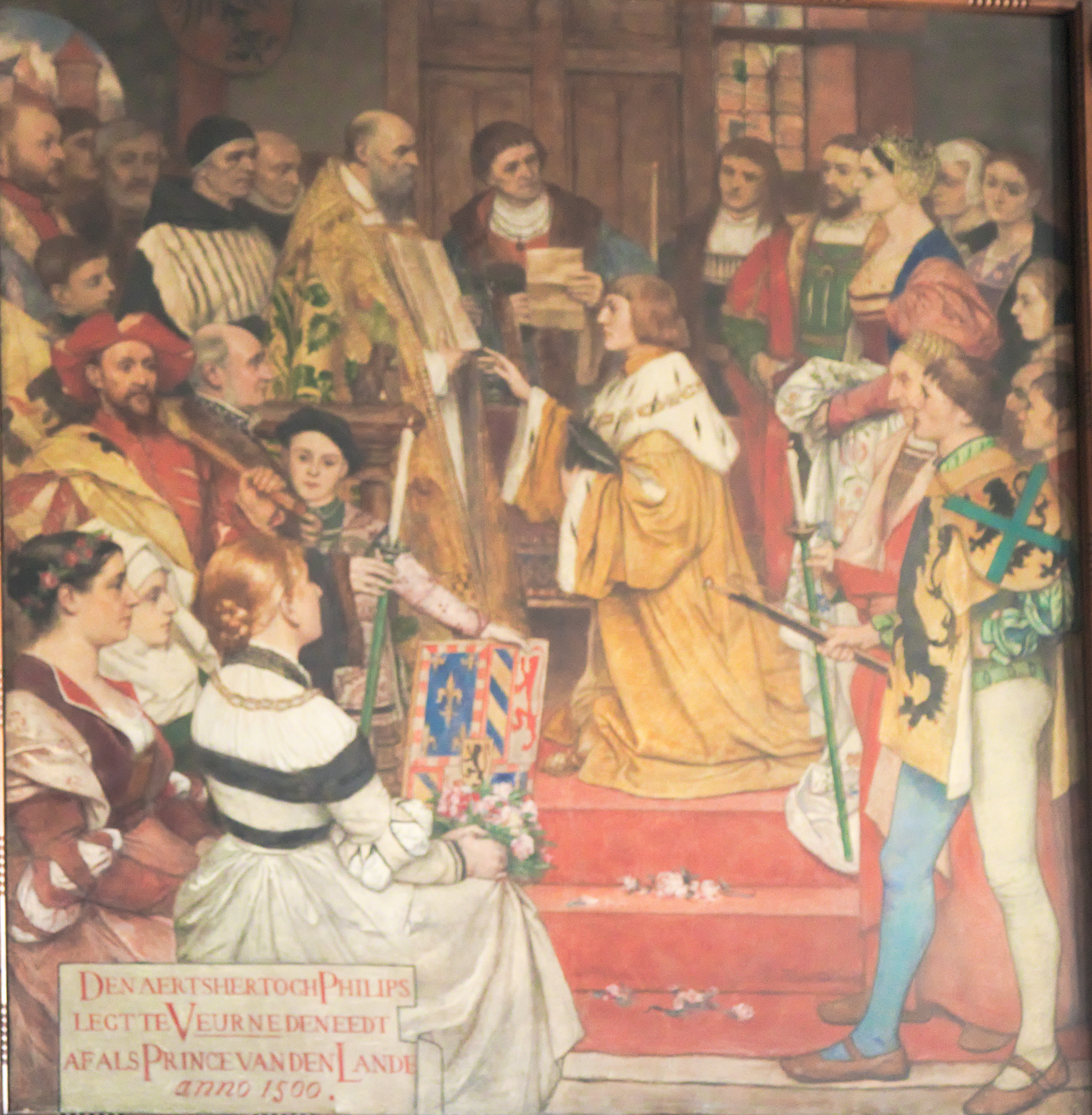
Archduke Philip visiting Veurne (Flanders) in 1500

From the time of Philip, the government in the Low Countries constituted a compromise between the states and the Empire (although, at this time, Burgundian lands had not become part of imperial circles yet, which would be confirmed in 1512 and formalized in 1548). The chancellor of Burgundy became responsible for the government's practical work in the absence of the emperor while the Great Council (Hoge Raad) acted as the country's highest body of judicial power.

Philip's policy was focused on maintaining peace and economic development for his Burgundian lands. Maximilian wanted to recover Guelders, but his son wanted to keep a neutral policy and thus the father was left fighting Charles of Egmond over Guelders on his own. Only at the end of his reign, Philip decided to deal with that threat together with his father. Guelders had been weakened because of the continuous state of war and other problems. That would turn out to be the only campaign in Philip's life. The duke of Cleves and the bishop of Utrecht, hoping to share spoils, gave Philip aid. Maximilian invested his own son with Guelders and Zutphen. Within months, Philip conquered the whole land and Charles of Egmond was forced to prostrate himself in front of his sovereign at the palace of Rosendaal. Charles was then forced to follow Philip wherever he went. In October 1505, they were in Brussels. But after that, Charles was able to escape and start the war again. Philip was not in a good position to make good his claims yet, because by this time he needed to depart to Spain to claim the Castilian throne.

At the same time, while he often carefully avoided direct confrontation with the French king, in promoting his Great Council, he slowly eroded the capacity of intervention of the Parlement of Paris in Flanders and Artois, lands under the sovereignty of France. This process would be completed by Charles V in 1521. In August 1505, this resulted in written protests from King Louis XII of France, who accused him of usurpation of the rights of the sovereign and threatened Philip with sanctions. To this, Maximilian, who at this time was with Philip after returning from Gelderland, angrily sent threats and stated that he would defend his son. Philip reacted in a concilliatory manner, stating that he had consulted Maximilian and did not mean to offend Louis.

Philip (and later his son Charles V) joined his father in patronising the devotion of the Seven Sorrows that associated his own mother Mary of Burgundy, who had died young and been idealised in vernacular literature, with the Virgin Mary. The devotion, with its strong current of patriotism and Burgundian nostalgia, successfully helped to rally loyalty to the ruling family in the turbulence after Mary's death. The same devotion was later used to promote dynastic and territorial unity.

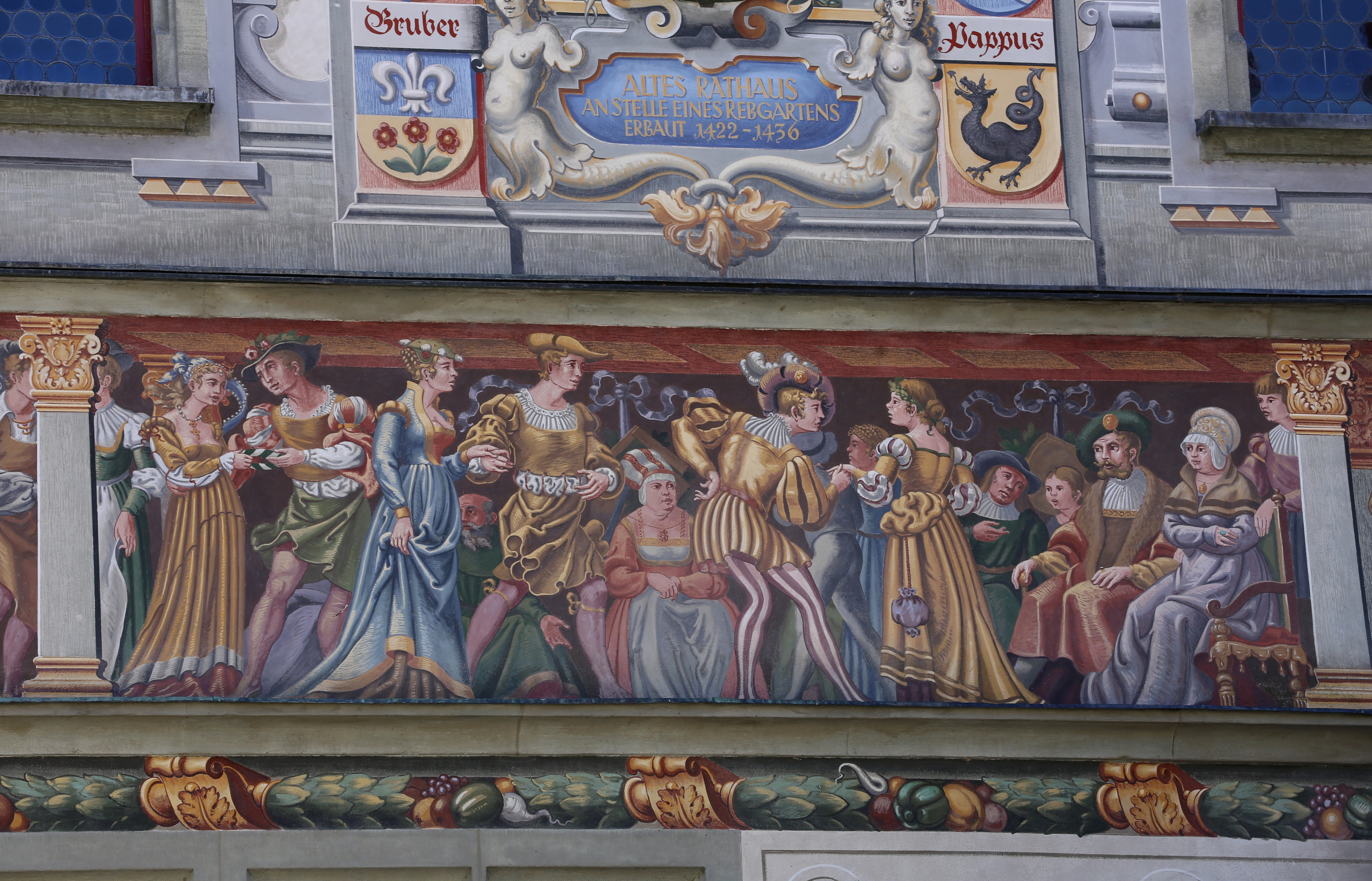
Fresco at the old Rathaus in Lindau, depicting the entry of Philip

He visited Germany several times:

- On 31 August 1496, he came to Lindau to represent his father at the Reichstag of Lindau (1496– 1497) because Maximilian could not come to the Diet personally.
- In 1498, he accompanied his father to the Reichstag in Freiburg.
- In 1505, he attended the Reichstag at Hagenau, where he and his father met the minister of the king of France, the Cardinal of Amboise.

== The Castilian inheritance ==
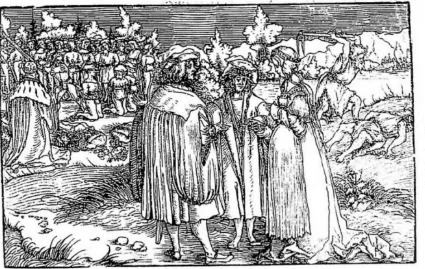
Maximilian I paying attention to an execution instead of watching Philip the Handsome and Joanna of Castile's betrothal, much to his son's dismay. Satire created on behalf of the councilors of Augsburg. Plate 89 of Von der Arztney bayder Glück by the Petrarcameister.

The marriage was one of a set of family alliances between the Habsburgs and the Trastámaras, designed to strengthen the two dynasties against growing French power, which had increased significantly thanks to the policies of Louis XI and the successful assertion of regal power after the war with the League of the Public Weal. The matter became more urgent after Charles VIII's invasion of Italy (known as the First Peninsular War). This was a matter of compromise for Philip. While assuring his pro-French advisors that he would maintain peaceful policies towards France, the marriage pleased Maximilian while allowing a partial, prudent emergence from France's shadow. Although, Philip did put efforts in safeguarding the 1493 Treaty of Senlis. His independent tendency frustrated both Maximilian and his new parents-in-law.

On 20 October 1496, he married Joanna, daughter of King Ferdinand II of Aragon and Queen Isabella I of Castile, in Lier, Belgium.

Philip's sister Margaret married John, Prince of Asturias, the only son of Ferdinand and Isabella and heir apparent to the unified crowns of Castile and Aragon. The double alliance was never intended to let the Spanish kingdoms fall under Habsburg control. At the time of her marriage to Philip, Joanna was third in line to the throne, with John and their sister Isabella married and hopeful of progeny.

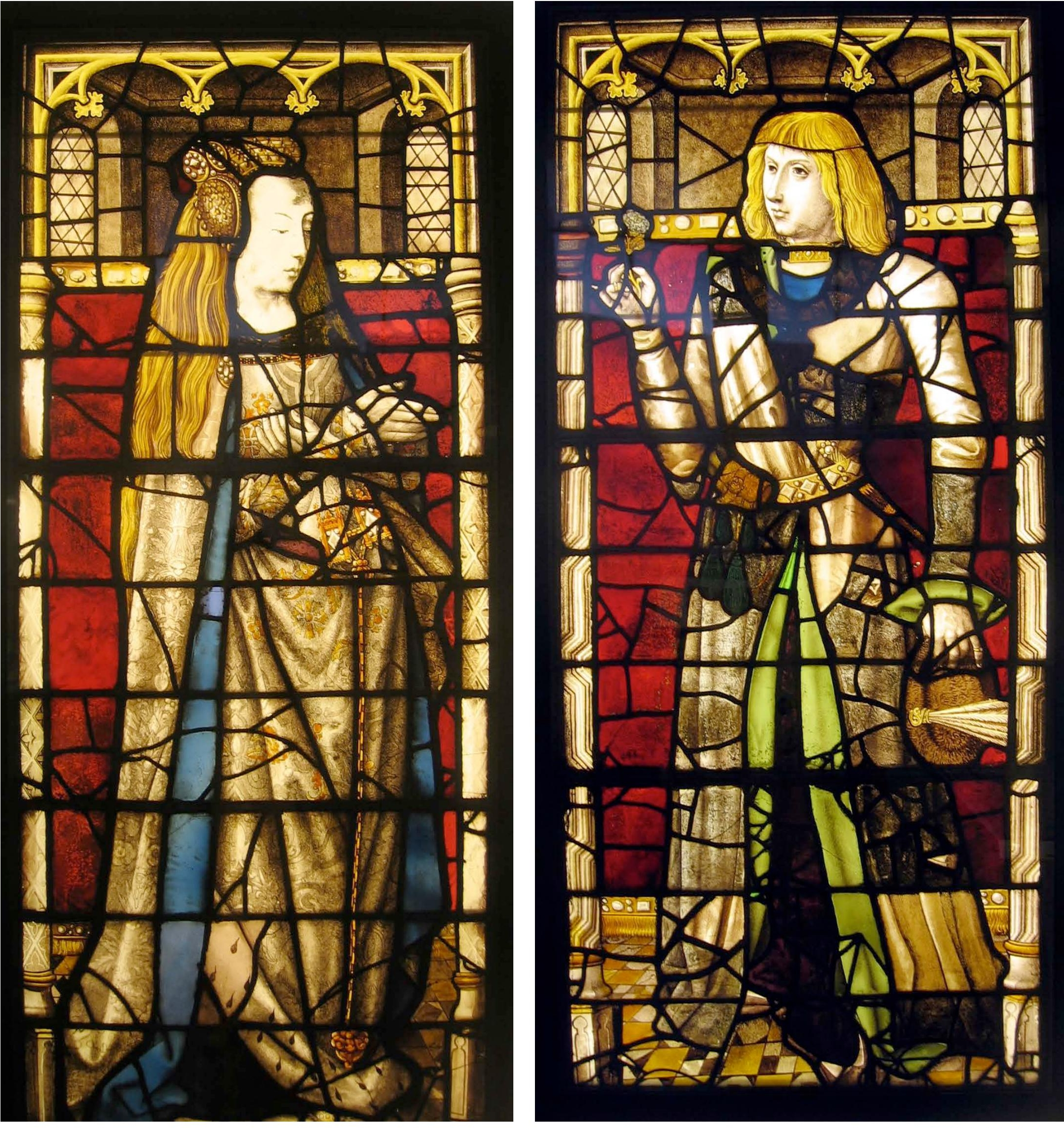
Philip the Fair and Joanna of Castile, stained glass, Basilica of the Holy Blood in Bruges, 1480–1490

In 1500, shortly after the birth of Joanna and Philip's second child (the future Emperor Charles V), in Flanders, the succession to the Castilian and Aragonese crowns was thrown into turmoil. The heir apparent, John, had died in 1497 very shortly after his marriage to Margaret of Austria. The crown thereby seemed destined to devolve upon his and Joanna's elder sister Isabella, wife of Manuel I of Portugal. She died in 1498, while giving birth to a son named Miguel da Paz, to whom succession to the united crowns of Castile, Aragon and Portugal now fell; however, the infant was sickly and died during the summer of 1500.

The succession to the Castilian and Aragonese crowns now fell to Joanna. Because Ferdinand could produce another heir, the Cortes of Aragon refused to recognize Joanna as heir presumptive to the Kingdom of Aragon. In the Kingdom of Castile, however, the succession was clear. Moreover, there was no Salic tradition that the Castilian Cortes could use to thwart the succession passing to Joanna. At this point, the issue of Joanna's supposed mental incompetence moved from courtly annoyance to the center of the political stage, since it was clear that Philip and his Burgundian entourage would be the real power-holders in Castile.

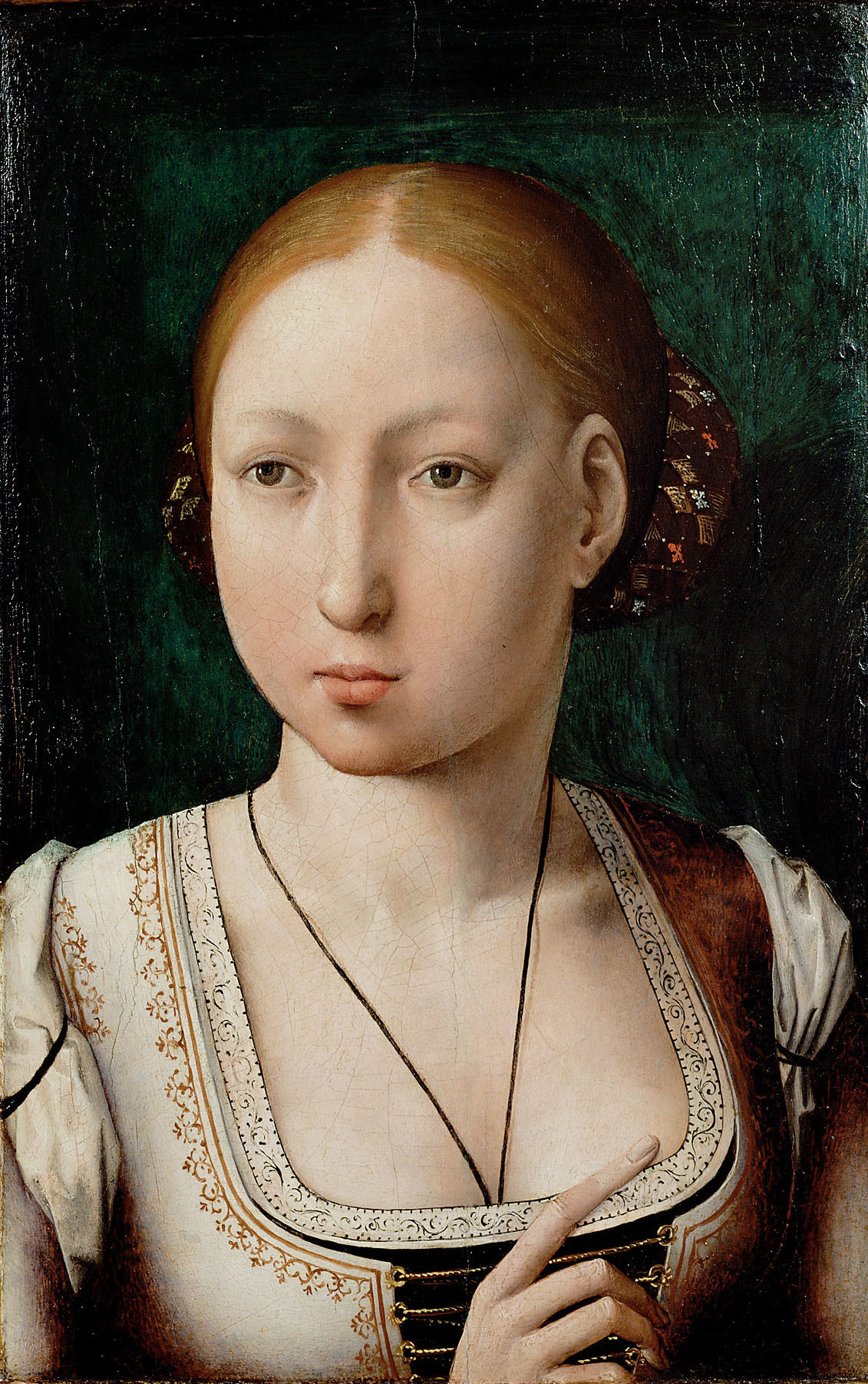
Joanna of Castile

In 1502, Philip, Joanna, and a large part of the Burgundian court traveled to Spain to receive fealty from the Cortes of Castile as heirs, a journey chronicled in intense detail by Antoon I van Lalaing (French: Antoine de Lalaing), the future Stadtholder of Holland and Zeeland. Philip and the majority of the court returned to the Low Countries in the following year, leaving a pregnant Joanna behind in Madrid, where she gave birth to Ferdinand, later Holy Roman Emperor.

Although Joanna was deeply in love with Philip, their married life was rendered extremely unhappy by his infidelity and political insecurity, during which time he constantly attempted to usurp her legal birthright of power. This led in great part to the rumours of her insanity from reports of depressive or neurotic acts committed while she was being imprisoned or coerced by her husband, rumors that benefited Philip politically. Most historians now agree she was merely clinically depressed at the time, not insane as commonly believed. Before her mother's death, in 1504, husband and wife were already living apart.

== King of Castile ==
In 1504, Philip's mother-in-law, Queen Isabella of Castile, died, leaving the Crown of Castile to Joanna. Isabella I's widower and former co-monarch, King Ferdinand II, endeavored to lay hands on the regency of Castile, but the nobles, who disliked and feared him, forced him to withdraw. Philip was summoned to Spain, where he was recognized as king.

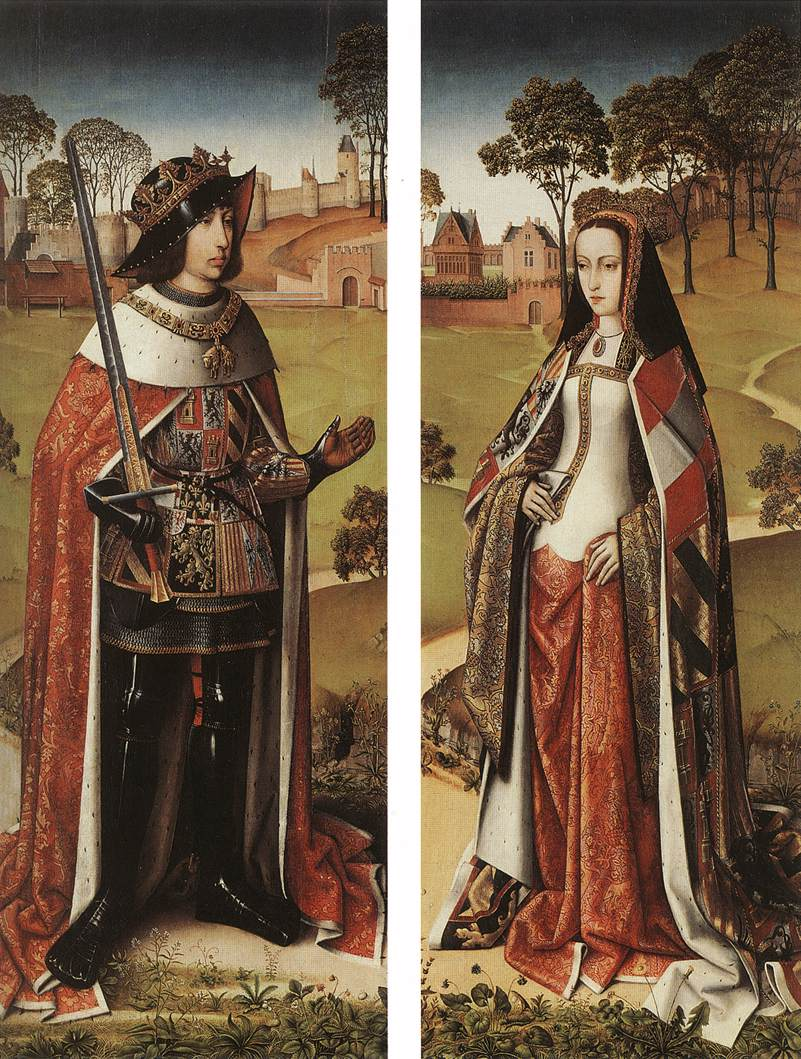
Phillip and Joanna, panels from a triptych, 1505 or 1506

However, en route to Spain in January 1506, Philip and Joanna were caught in a storm and shipwrecked off the Dorset coast, forcing them on the shore near Melcombe Regis. The nearest important gentleman in the locality was Sir Thomas Trenchard, seated at Wolfeton House, who gave shelter and entertainment to the royal couple. The future minister John Russell attended the couple on this occasion, after which Philip recommended him to Henry VII. Having been conducted to the palace of King Henry VII by Russell, the couple stayed as the king's guests but were in fact hostages for the duration of their stay. To get released Philip was forced to sign a treaty with Henry VII—the so-called Malus Intercursus—which included a mutual defense pact, the extradition of rebels, including the Earl of Suffolk, Edmund de la Pole, who as an exile was a guest of Philip in the Low Countries, and a trade agreement which allowed English merchants to import cloth duty-free into the Low Countries. After handing over Edmund, Philip and Joanna were allowed to leave England after a stay of six weeks.

Philip and Joanna landed at Corunna on 28 April 1506, accompanied by a body of German mercenaries. Father- and son-in-law mediated under Cardinal Cisneros at Remesal, near Puebla de Sanabria, and at Renedo, the only result of which was an indecent family quarrel, in which Ferdinand professed to defend the interests of his daughter, who he said was imprisoned by her husband. In meetings between 20 and 27 June, mediated by Cardinal Cisneros, the senior churchman in Spain, Ferdinand accepted that his 'most beloved children' (Joanna and Philip) should take over control of Castile.

The two kings then agreed that Joanna was neither fit nor inclined to rule 'considering her infirmities and sufferings, which for the sake of honour are not expressed' and further that if 'the said most serene Queen, either from her own choice or from being persuaded by other persons should attempt to meddle in the government both would prevent it'. It suited both her father and her husband that she be regarded as incapable.

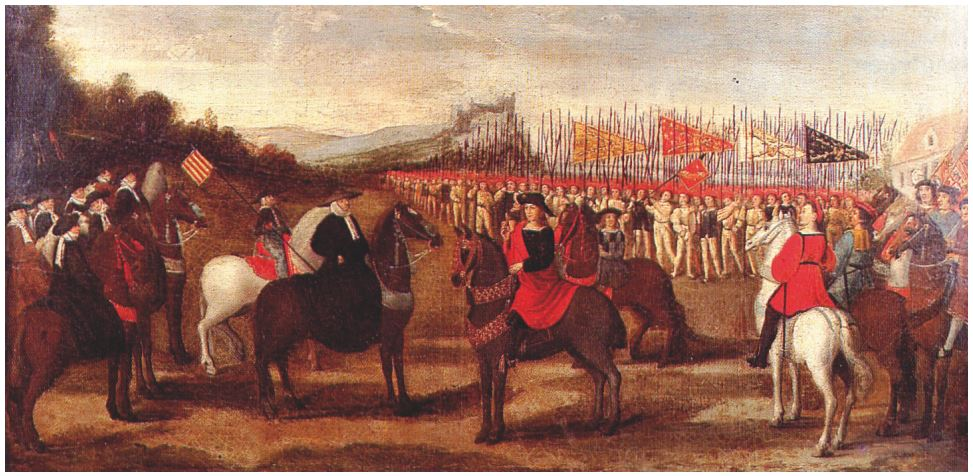
Meeting of Philip and Ferdinand II of Aragon in Remesal on 20 June 1506

On 27 June 1506, the Treaty of Villafáfila was signed between Ferdinand and Philip, with Philip being proclaimed King of Castile by the Cortes of Valladolid. Yet on the same day Ferdinand drew up secret documents repudiating all the agreements on the grounds of coercion, claiming that he would never otherwise have signed treaties that did 'such enormous damage to the said most serene Queen, my daughter, and me'. Having left his options for the future open, he departed for Aragon. Philip appointed García Laso de la Vega (diplomat and commander, Comendador Mayor de Léon under the Catholic Monarch, died 1512) as President of the Royal Council.

Even before leaving the Low Countries, Philip had ordered the total suspension of Spanish Inquisition activities. When he arrived in Spain, he proposed to the Cortes that the Inquisitor General should be deposed and the Council of Inquisition should be dissolved. His early death prevented the plan from materializing, but Ferdinand later reacted to this by splitting the Holy Tribunal, thus Castile and Aragon would each possess their own Inquisition organization. The 4,000 landsknechte who followed him to Spain presumably helped to overcome the last opposition to the military reform started by Gonzalo de Cordoba and Gonzalo de Ayora.

As Duke of Burgundy and King of Castile, Philip expanded the Habsburg postal system established by his father. In 1500, the centre of the system was transferred to Brussels by Franz von Taxis, whom Philip made his postmaster-general. Shortly after becoming King of Castile, as he realized that his bureaucrats were unable to govern the postal system, he made an agreement (later renewed by Charles of Burgundy) with the Taxis that allowed them to operate unhampered by interference from the state, as long as they maintained standards in accordance with the Habsburgs' interests. Behringer notes that, "The terminology of the early modern communications system and the legal status of its participants were invented at these negotiations." On 18 January 1505 Philip unified communication between Germany, the Netherlands, France and Spain by adding stations in Granada, Toledo, Blois, Paris and Lyon.

His arrival introduced the Burgundian household model into Spain, but his early death forced it to wait until Charles V's reign to become a firmly-established element of the Spanish court.

After one month in La Coruña, he returned to Burgos and set about to appoint his men to strategic fortresses, the Royal Council as well as financial offices. He granted the Castle of Segovia and some other important fortresses to Don Juan Manuel (who was ironically Ferdinand's former servant, and had become Philip's favourite after the archbishop of Besançon died.

He ran into financial troubles as parts of his army remained unpaid and he granted generous financial conditions to Ferdinand to hasten his departure.

Cauchies writes that, in Spain, Philip found himself in the same situation his father had been during his Burgundian days. Until this day, he has been accused of being a foreign, spendthrift prince, a mere transitional monarch who was supported by bad advisors who disregarded the interests of the country. Philip would not live to see a better day like his father had, though.

== Patronage of the arts ==
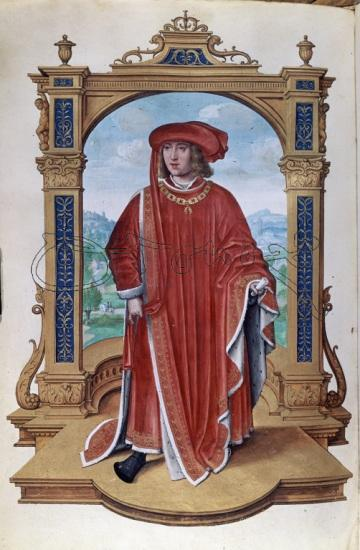
Miniature of Philip in the Statutes of the Golden Fleece. Attributed to Simon Bening

Philip was an important patron of Hieronymus Bosch. In 1504, he commissioned Bosch to paint a large triptych of The Last Judgement. The work cannot be found now, but likely had some relation to the smaller triptych of the same subject in Vienna (painted by the same artist), as the face of the saint on the right outer wing seems to be that of Philip.

Philip's chapel had some of the most distinguished musicians in Europe: Henry Bredemers, Pierre de La Rue, Alexander Agricola, Marbrianus de Orto and Antoine Divitis. Josquin Desprez sometimes composed for him as well. The contemporary Venetian ambassador wrote home: "Three things [here] are of the highest excellence: silk ..., tapestry ..., [and] music, which certainly can be said to be perfect." Perhaps influenced by Maximilian, Philip actively supported instrumental music. There seemed to be a lend-lease arrangement of some kind between the courts of father and son, as the trombonist Augustine Schubinger worked for both Maximilian and Philip. Other outstanding wind players supported by Philip included Hans Nagel and Jan Van den Winckel.

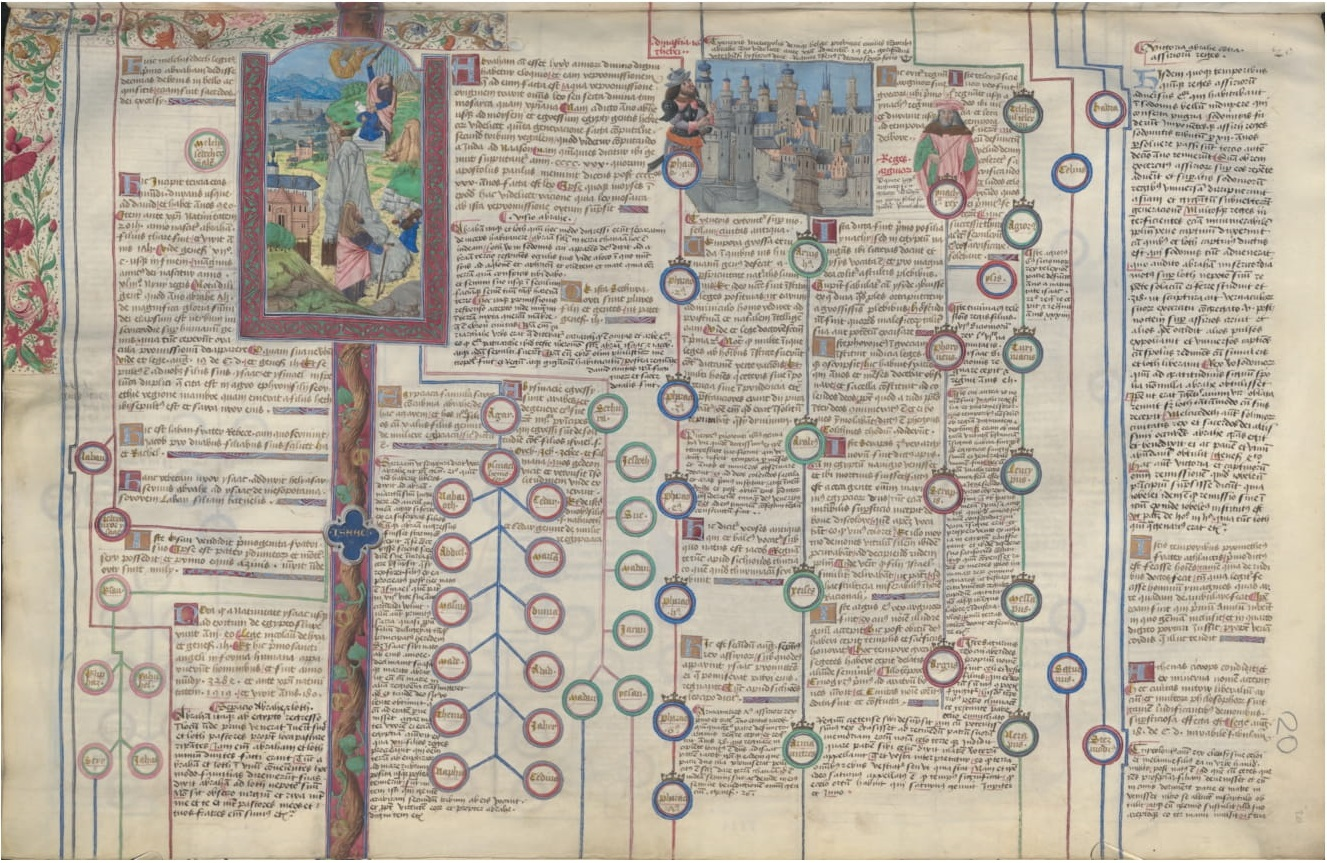
Fol. 20r in Johannes de Vico's world chronicle (Chronicon, around 1495–1498). Cod. 325, Österreichische Nationalbibliothek, Vienna

Philip realized the potential of the printing industry regarding its ability to disseminate information, but when it came to private taste, he had an aversion towards printed books and preferred manuscripts, especially musical manuscripts, which became popular diplomatic gifts under his reign. The chief musical scribe was the priest Martin Bourgeois. The court also employed other scribes and calligraphers. The grandees of the realm also adopted the taste of their sovereign.

His patronage of manuscripts though could not compare with that of his ancestors Philip the Bold and Philip the Good, as he died young and manuscript production had declined overall by the end of the fifteenth century. One manuscript produced for him, a world chronicle by Johannes de Vico from Douai (Cod. 325, Österreichische Nationalbibliothek in Vienna, 660 × 430mm), is unrivalled in comparison with his predecessor's manuscripts though. The layout and content display many unique features. The heraldic program on fol.17v seems to correspond to the situation of the 1498 Treaty of Paris, when Philip sided with the French king and the papacy against his father (who is referred to as emperor in the lineage of Holy Roman Emperors and the inscription that introduces the commissioner, but otherwise appears not in his own right but as the consort of Mary of Burgundy and guardian of Philip; Frederick III, Philip's paternal grandfather, on the other hand, is given a lengthy section; also the book does not mention Philip's Burgundian ancestors or King Louis IX of France, who frequently features in French universal chronicles of the fifteenth century).

Philip was a patron to Desiderius Erasmus, who praised him for making peace with France and advised him that after God, a prince's duty was owed first to patria (the nation) and not to pater (father, in this case Maximilian).

== Death and aftermath ==
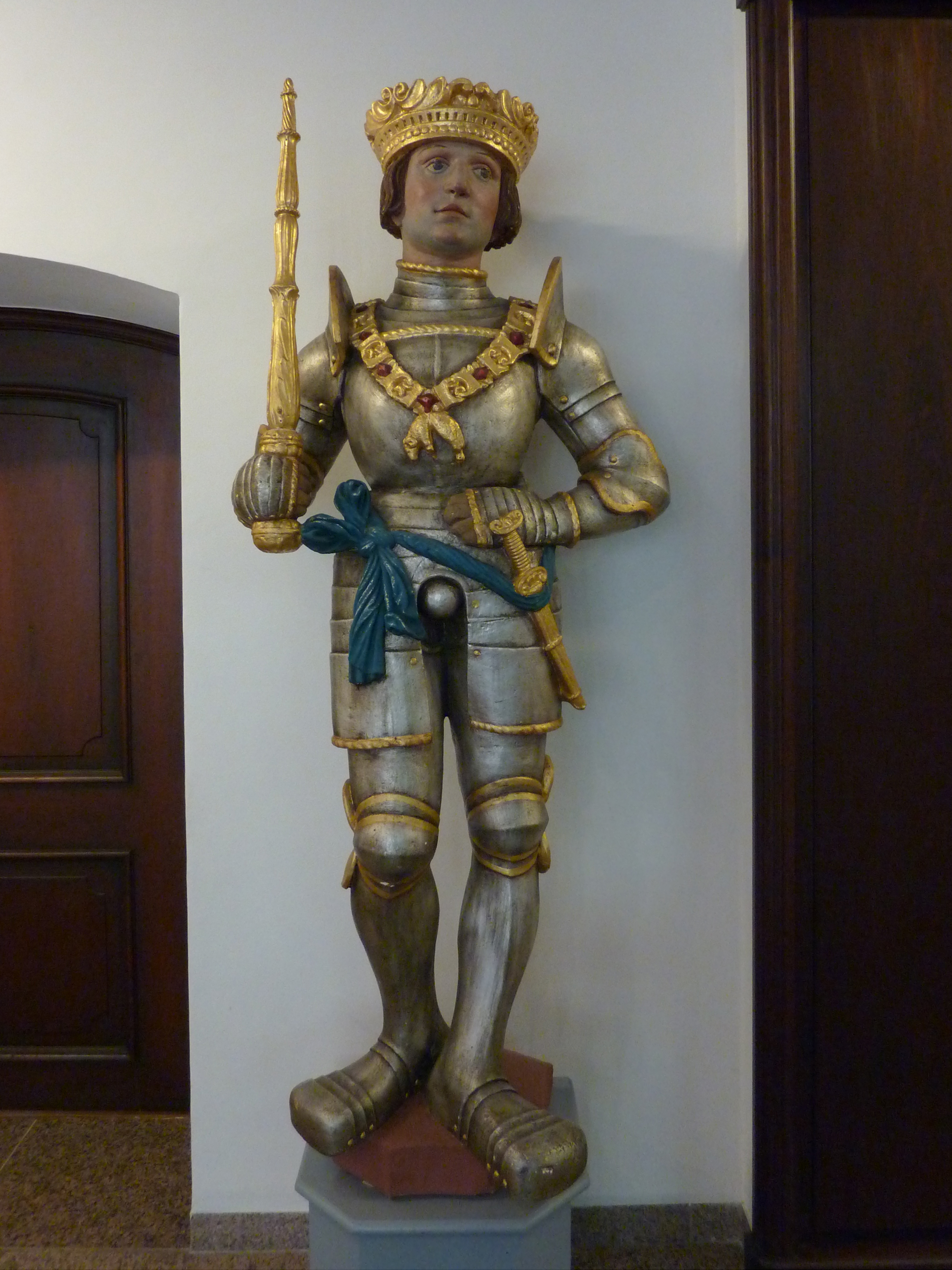
Statue created by Sixt von Staufen in Basler Hof (Freiburg), around 1530–1531

However, Philip died suddenly at Burgos, apparently of typhoid fever, on 25 September 1506, although a poisoning (assassination) was widely spoken of at the time, and is what his wife believed to be the cause of Philip's death. His wife supposedly refused to allow his body to be buried or part from it for a while. Philip I is entombed at the Royal Chapel of Granada (Capilla Real de Granada), alongside his wife, and her parents Isabella I and Ferdinand II. Cauchies even proposes plague as a possible cause of death, as at this point Philip seemed to be exhausted, having overworked himself (the workload was so enormous that despite being a passionate hunter all his life, Philip was unable to exercise this hobby for just once, as he wrote to his father in July 1506) and there were known incidents of plague in the environment. Philip had shown a level of prudence about the food served to him: a letter of the experienced German commander Wolfgang von Fürstenberg (who commanded the Landsknechte and was attached to Philip's entourage by Maximilian) to Maximilian shows that in A Coruña, Philip ate only at Fürstenberg's table because he distrusted other sources of food. Nevertheless, Maximilian unhesitatingly and openly blamed Louis XII for his beloved son's death in front of the Imperial Diet.

Following Philip's death, a delegation of the States General of the Netherlands was sent to Austria to offer the regency to Maximilian. After a period of prevarication, possibly linked to his depression as a result of his son's death, Maximilian decided to appoint Philip's sister, Margaret of Austria as governor. In April 1507, the States General accepted the appointment.

In Spain, hearing about Philip's death. the opponents of the Inquisition made a move. The marquis of Priego attacked the Inquisition's prison and liberated its prisoners. The procurator was arrested. Diego Rodríguez Lucero, the inquisitor of Cordoba, managed to flee. "The canons, the municipality and the nobility—the marquis of Priego and the count of Cabra—all denounced the excesses, corruption and abuses of the inquisitor". This later caused Ferdinand to declare Grand Inquisitor Deza to be responsible. Deza was forced to resign and was replaced with Cardinal Cisneros, who arrested Lucero in 1508.

== Epithets ==
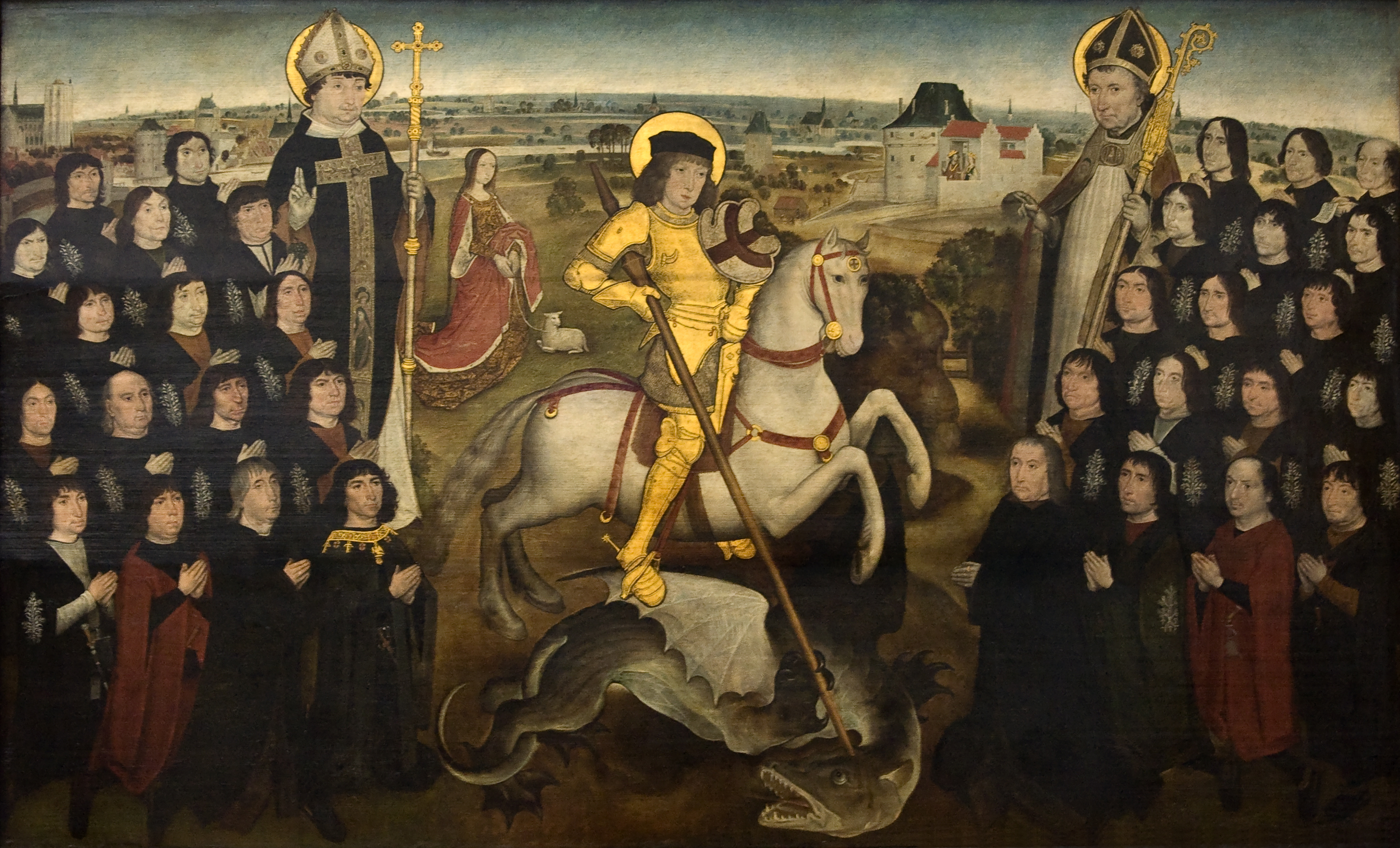
"The members of the guild of the large crossbow in Mechelen" (c.1500), by the Master of the Mechelen Guild of Saint George, kmska 28-02-2010 13-43-37. As requested by the Guild, Saint George bears the features of Philip while the princess has the features of Joanna. Like his great-grandfather Philip the Good, Philip the Handsome participated in shooting competitions and kept a special relationship with guilds.

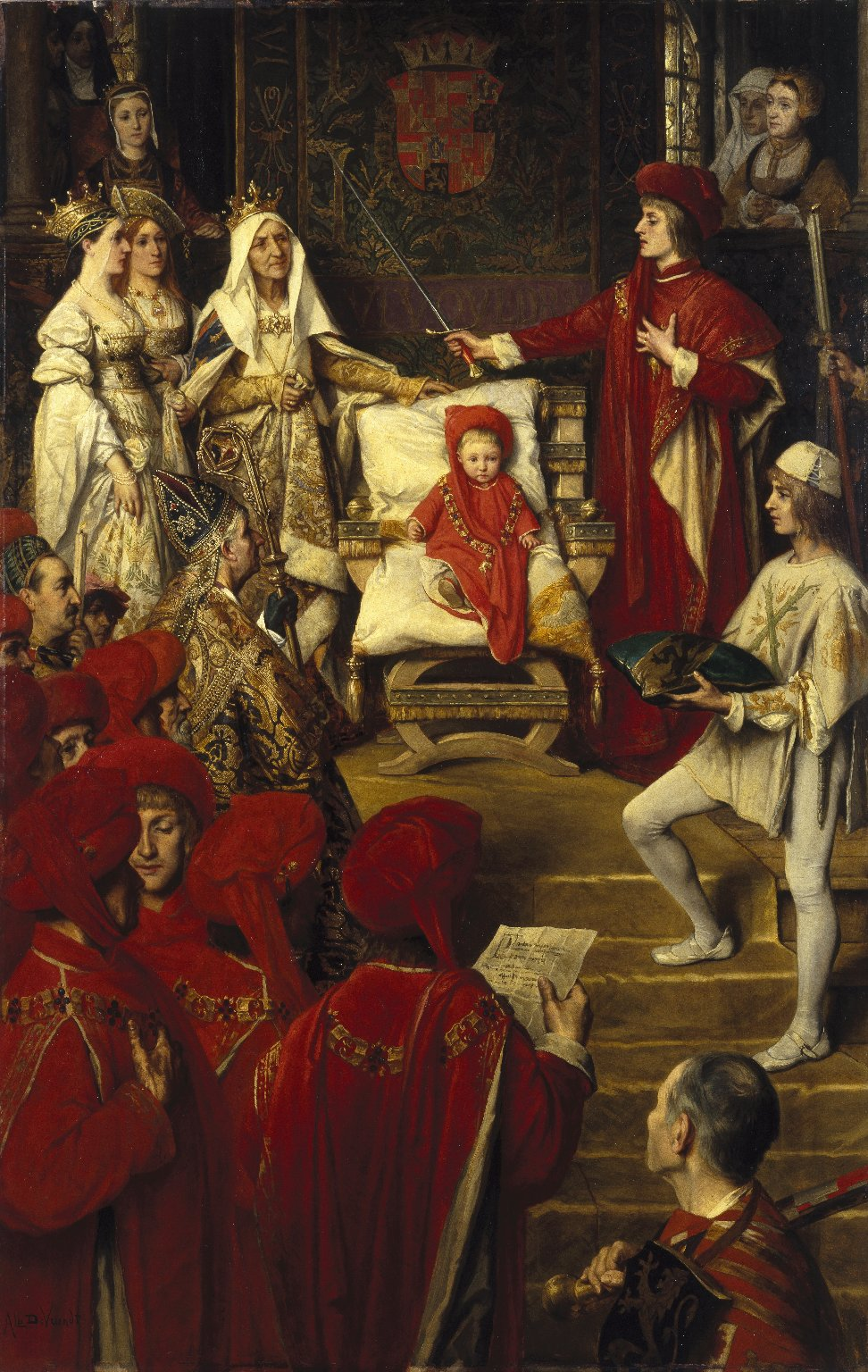
Philip the Handsome conferring the Order of the Golden Fleece on his son Charles of Luxembourg. Painting by Albrecht De Vriendt (1880)

His good looks earned him the nickname "the Handsome" or "the Fair".

Many contemporaries noticed Philip's physical attractiveness. Vincenzo Querini, the Venetian ambassador, described Philip as "physically beautiful, vigorous and rich" (bello di corpo, gagliardo e prospero). Peter Martyr d'Anghiera and Lorenzo de Padilla also noted his good looks. When Louis XII of France saw him, the king said, "What a handsome prince!" (Que voilà un beau prince)."

He was a slim sportsman who liked to dress in a sumptuous style and knew how to impress women. His skills in knightly exercises and the hunt was such that even as a youth, he acted as teacher of the princes sent to his court.

Joan-Lluis Palos suggests that the epithet might come also from his riding style and his behaviours as a sportsman. When he visited Castile in 1502, he astonished his hosts when he displayed his riding skills by leaping from one horse to another. He also admired a Spanish riding style (inspired by the Muslims), called "à la jineta", with bent knees and short stirrups. He learned this from Rámon of Cardona, Master of King Ferdinand's stable, in a matter of days. According to Lorenzo de Padilla, he "played all sports as a pastime, and was fonder of la pelota [handball] than any other." He also appeared to prefer the luxurious "Moorish" dressing style to the Spanish one. A 1611 dictionary explains thus:

jinete [rider] might come from cinete, which is Cinetum in Arabic, and means ornament, from the word ceyene, to beautify or make beautiful ["hermosear o ser hermoso"], from the gallantry of riders when they rally to festivities with their turbans and feathers, fitted Moorish dresses and boots and the harnesses of their rich horses.

Philip also had the nickname "Croit-Conseil" (Believer of Counsel or Believer of Council), chosen for him by Olivier de La Marche. This nickname has sometimes been interpreted as portraying a malleable prince who allowed his advisors to control the country. According to Catherine Emerson, attending to conseil is actually a cardinal virtue of a prince, which La March attributed to both Philip the Good and his great-grandson. Anna Margarete Schlegelmilch also writes that the nickname is not derogative in any way. Both La March and other contemporaries like Jean Molinet thought that it was a good sign when a young ruler was open to the words of prudent and wise advisors. It corresponds to the ruling style of a prince who, out of the desire to attain peace and economic recovery for a country that had recently experienced too much turbulence, tried to balance his government between the rights of the prince, the nobles and the provinces, gave his Estates a say in the matters of war and peace, and relied upon confidants whose families had served his ancestors for generations (the conseil ducal had 14 members, including Engelbert II of Nassau, William de Croÿ, John III of Bergen).

== Legacy ==
Philip was a figure often eclipsed in history books by his parents, Mary and Maximilian, partly also by his tragic wife Joanna I, and even more so by his son, Charles V. In his 2003 biography Philippe le Beau: le dernier duc de Bourgogne (Philip the Handsome: the last Duke of Burgundy), Belgian historian Jean-Marie Cauchies writes that Philip, who died young, still at the beginning of his political ascendancy, was not yet an aspirant for universal monarchy like his son later, but remained above all the heir and continuator of the dukes of Burgundy. Surrounded by ambitious ministers with very divergent views, facing his father (the emperor of the Holy Roman Empire), his parents-in-law (the Catholic monarchs), and the king of France, his choices as a leader presented him as the "enfant terrible" of international European politics. According to Cauchies, he was not a "great man", or had not lived long enough to show himself as such. He had not shown the stature or the creativity of his father, and could not claim the scope that Charles V reached either. But he personified the prince of peace and concord, the promise of better days, and his education, his manners, his court displayed the essence of Burgundian culture.

Belgian historian Jonathan Dumont, while reviewing Le Royaume inachevé des ducs de Bourgogne (XIVe–XVe siècles) (translated into English as The Illusion of the Burgundian State) Élodie Lecuppre-Desjardin, notes that historiography dealing with the Burgundian state building project should not end with Charles the Bold, as attempts to build a monarchical and state-ideal became particularly visible under Philip the Handsome and extended into the early years of Charles of Habsburg. If there was a rupture, it happened only with the 1519 imperial election.

James Kennedy notes that by most accounts, Philip was "an ideal prince, well acquainted with and well disposed toward the Low Countries."

German historían Klaus Oschema argues that the Burgundian-Habsburg alliance's situation in the West, and especially their ascension in Spain, was far from being guaranteed in the beginning. It was the work of Philip and his sister Margaret that made their father's expansion strategy in the West possible and paved the way for the Habsburgs' ultimate success.

Some criticize him for being a sadist in private life though, regarding his treatment of Joanna, that he "held Juana in a vicious cycle of affection, abuse, and intimidation from which she was constitutionally unable to escape." He had a loving relationship with Margaret, who had been separated from him for a long time though. When they said goodbye to each other in 1497, Margaret told her brother these prophetic words, with a taste of gallows humour, "Don't make me cry, I will need to swallow enough salt water."

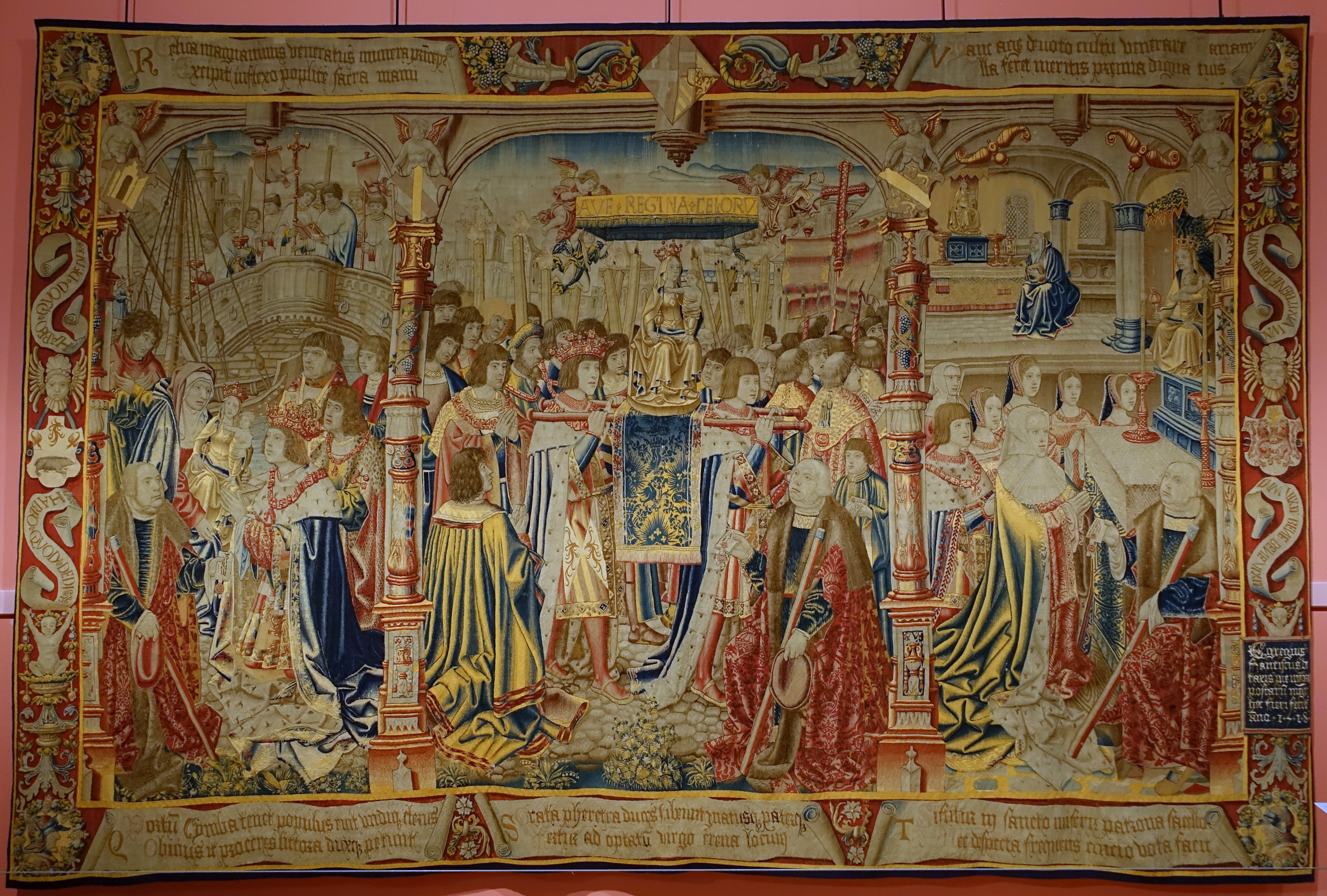
Arrival of the statue of Notre-Dame to Brussels, from the tenture of Notre-Dame du Sablon, 1518, wool and silk - Cinquantenaire Museum - Brussels, Belgium. The kneeling figure wearing a crown on the left is Philip.

== Depictions in arts ==
- Peter Frey, a composer active in the first half of the sixteenth century, wrote a song about Philip's 1506 journey and visit to Santiago.
- There are two "historical songs" in the Netherlands about Philip's journey and death, which also paint a negative picture of Joanna. One of them accuses her of poisoning Philip.
- Absalon, fili mi is a motet, possibly commissioned by Maximilian to commemorate Philip's death, and written by Pierre de la Rue, although there are controversies on the matter.
- Arch of Philip IV by Peter Paul Rubens, Jacob Jordaens and Cornelis de Vos (1614) features the marriage of Philip and Joanna on the main panel of one side.
- Maximilian's Cenotaph in Innsbruck features a large statue of Philip (measuring 272 cm (107 in)), also considered one of the most notable staues of the group.
- There are various depictions of the scene of Philip's death and Joanna in mourning. Doña Joanna the Mad (1877) by the Spanish painter Francisco Pradilla is a notable example. Others include Juana la Loca (1836) by Charles de Steuben, Demencia de Doña Juana de Castilla (1866) by Lorenzo Vallés.
- Philip is depicted in a miniature in the Freydal tournament book jousting with his father, Maximilian, who is in the guise of the book's eponymous hero. The scene is anachronistic as the tournament book, commissioned by Maximilian between 1512 and 1515, tells a fictionalised story, through allegory, of how Maximilian met Philip's mother.

== Family ==
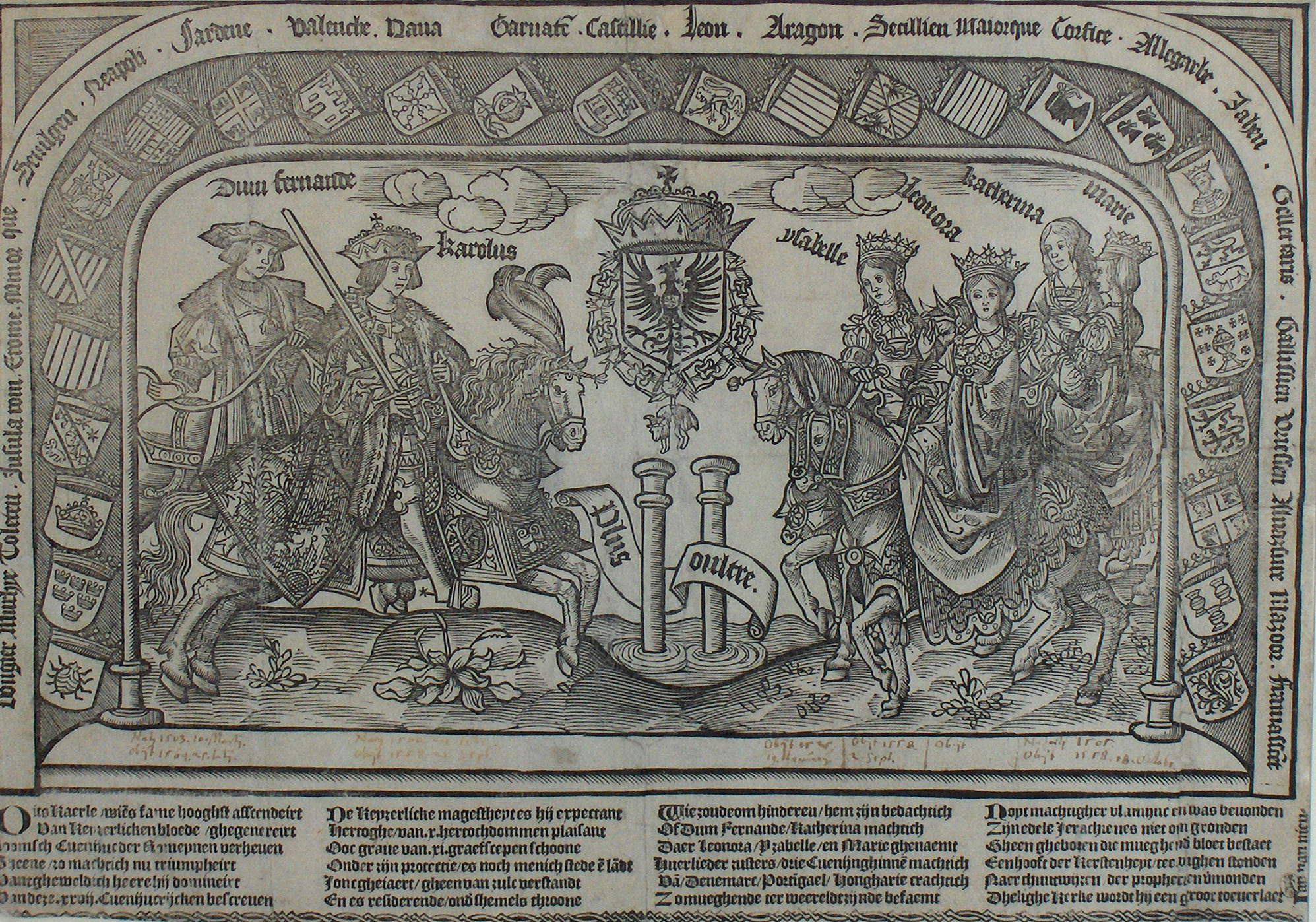
Children of Philip and Joanna

At the beginning of their marriage, Philip had genuine affection for Joanna. But his education, which was influenced by Franco-Burgundian traditions, contributed to a model of rulership "exclusively male", thus he never saw Joanna as his political equal and could not accept that she tried to forge her own political identity. Maximilian tried to reconcile the couple, telling Philip that he could only succeed as a ruler if husband and wife acted as "una cosa medesima" (one and the same), but despite Philip's efforts, Joanna would not cooperate in his power struggle against her own father. In the end, his controlling and manipulative behaviours, together with Ferdinand's ambitions and Joanna's depression, ruined the marriage and led to Joanna's personal tragedies. Philip and Joanna of Castile had:

- Eleanor (1498–1558), queen consort of Portugal and France
- Charles V (1500–1558), king of Spain, emperor of the Holy Roman Empire
- Isabella (1501–1526), queen consort of Denmark, Norway and Sweden
- Ferdinand (1503-1564), emperor of the Holy Roman Empire (1556-1564)
- Mary (1505–1558), queen consort of Hungary and Bohemia, governor of the Spanish Netherlands
- Catherine (1507–1578), queen consort of Portugal

== Titles ==
Coat of arms of Philip as an Archduke and Titular Duke of Burgundy

Coat of arms of Philip as Count Palatine of Burgundy

Coat of arms of Philip as King of Castile

- 27 March 1482 – 25 September 1506: Titular Duke of Burgundy as Philip IV
- 27 March 1482 – 25 September 1506: Duke of Brabant as Philip III
- 27 March 1482 – 25 September 1506: Duke of Limburg as Philip III
- 27 March 1482 – 25 September 1506: Duke of Lothier as Philip III
- 27 March 1482 – 25 September 1506: Duke of Luxemburg as Philip II
- 27 March 1482 – 25 September 1506: Margrave of Namur as Philip V
- 27 March 1482 – 25 September 1506: Count Palatine of Burgundy as Philip VI
- 27 March 1482 – 25 September 1506: Count of Artois as Philip VI
- 27 March 1482 – 25 September 1506: Count of Charolais as Philip III
- 27 March 1482 – 25 September 1506: Count of Flanders as Philip IV
- 27 March 1482 – 25 September 1506: Count of Hainaut as Philip II
- 27 March 1482 – 25 September 1506: Count of Holland as Philip II
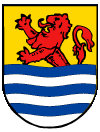
- 27 March 1482 – 25 September 1506: Count of Zeeland as Philip II
- 27 March 1482 – 1492: Duke of Guelders as Philip I
- 27 March 1482 – 1492: Count of Zutphen as Philip I

== Sources ==
- Bietenholz, Peter G.; Deutscher, Thomas B. (1987). Contemporaries of Erasmus. University of Toronto Press. ISBN 978-0-8020-2575-3.
- Campbell, Anna (2016). "Colette of Corbie: Cult and Canonization". In Mueller, Joan; Warren, Nancy Bradley (eds.). A Companion to Colette of Corbie. Vol. 66. Brill.
- Cauchies, Jean-Marie (2003). Philippe le Beau: le dernier duc de Bourgogne. Turnhout: Brepols.
- Dumont, Jean (1726). Corps universel diplomatique du droit des gens. Vol. III (2). Amsterdam: Brunel & Wetstein.
- Hutchinson, Robert (2011). Young Henry: The Rise of Henry VIII. St. Martin's Press.
- Ingrao, Charles W. (2000). The Habsburg Monarchy, 1618–1815 (2nd ed.). Cambridge University Press.
- Picot, Émile; Stein, Henri (1923). Recueil de pièces historiques imprimées sous le règne de Louis XI. Vol. 1. Paris: Société des bibliophiles françois.
- Saenger, Paul (1977). "Burgundy and the Inalienability of Appanages in the Reign of Louis XI". French Historical Studies. 10 (1): 1–26. doi:10.2307/286114. JSTOR 286114.
- Sicking, L H J (2004). Neptune and the Netherlands: State, Economy, and War at Sea in the Renaissance. Brill.
- Thiry, Steven (2016). "Chapter 10: Forging Dynasty: The Politics of Dynastic Affinity in Burgundian-Habsburg Birth and Baptism Ceremonial (1430-1505)". In Raeymaekers, Dries; Derks, Sebastiaan (eds.). The Key to Power?: The Culture of Access in Princely Courts, 1400-1750. Brill. pp. 268–295.
- Winder, Simon (2014). Danubia: A Personal History of Habsburg Europe. Farrar, Straus and Giroux.

Philip the Handsome House of Habsburg Born: 22 February 1478 Died: 25 September 1506
Regnal titles
Preceded by Joanna I as sole monarch	King of Castile and León; 1506 with Joanna I	Succeeded by Joanna I and Ferdinand V
Preceded by Mary	Duke of Guelders; Count of Zutphen; 1482–1492	Succeeded by Charles II
Preceded by Mary	Duke of Brabant, Limburg, Lothier and Luxemburg, Margrave of Namur, Count of Flanders, Hainaut, Holland and Zeeland; 1482–1506	Succeeded by Charles II & III
Vacant French occupation Title last held by Mary	Count of Artois, Burgundy and Charolais; 1493-1506	Succeeded by Charles II & III
