= Francisco Pradilla y Ortiz =

Spanish painter

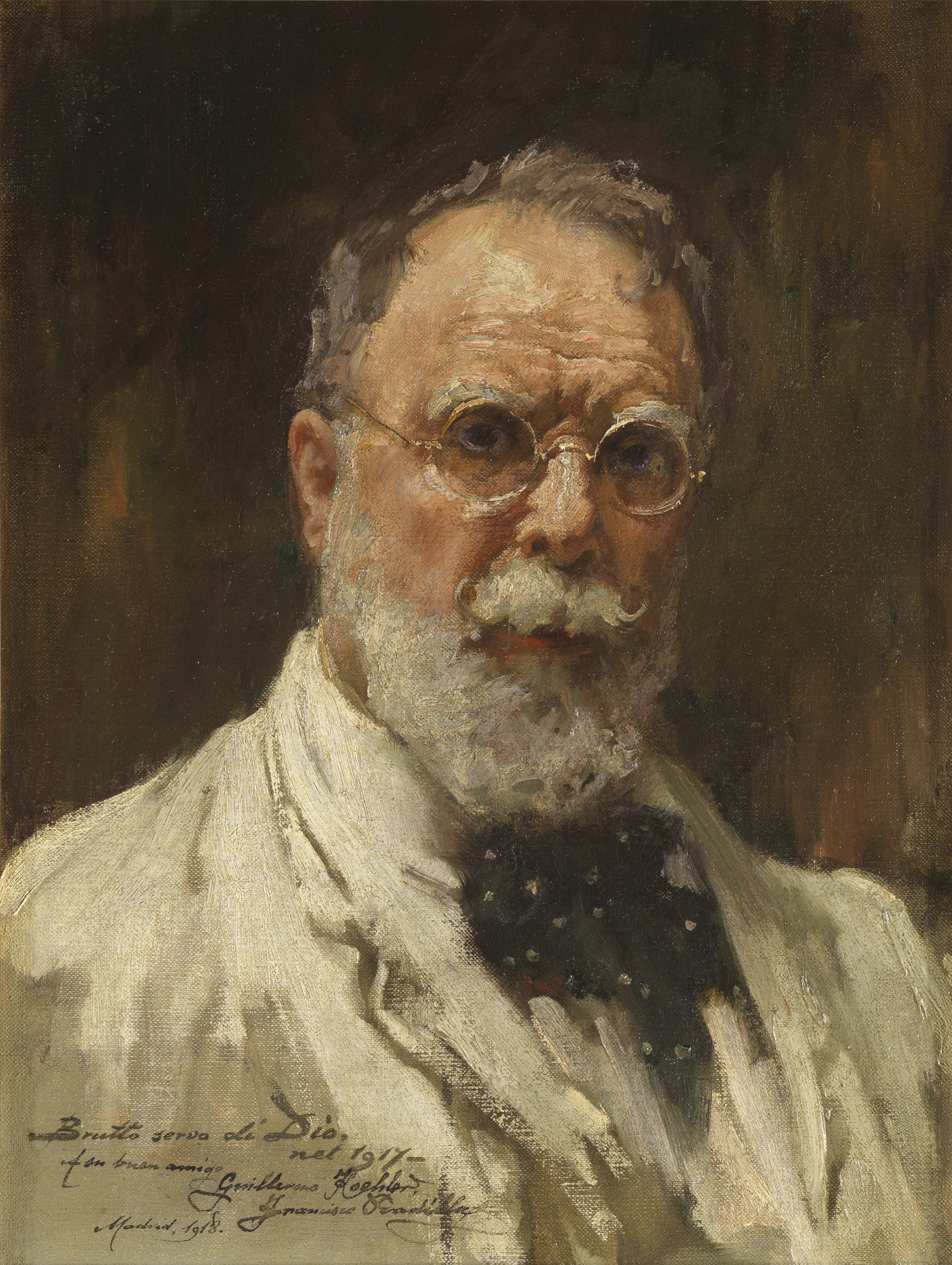
- Self-portrait (1917)
- Born: 24 July 1848; Villanueva de Gállego, Zaragoza, Spain
- Died: 1 November 1921 (aged 73); Madrid, Spain
- Education: Academy of Spain in Rome
- Known for: Historical paintings
- Style: Painting, watercolor
- Movement: Classicism, academicism
- Patrons: Luis Álvarez Catalá, Maria Christina of Austria

Francisco Pradilla y Ortiz (24 July 1848 – 1 November 1921) was a prolific Spanish painter famous for creating historical scenes.

== Biography ==
He was born in Villanueva de Gállego, in Zaragoza Province and began his studies in Zaragoza. He then transferred to the Real Academia de Bellas Artes de San Fernando and, later, the "Academia de Acuarelistas" (Academy of Watercolorists) in Madrid.

In 1873, he became one of the first students chosen to study at the new Spanish Academy in Rome. From there he had opportunities to travel to France and Venice and studied the old masters.

In 1878 he submitted his painting Doña Joanna the Mad or (Juana la Loca) to the National Exhibition of Fine Arts and was awarded the Medal of Honor. In 1879, the Spanish Senate then commissioned him to create La Rendición de Granada (The Surrender of Granada), which took him three years to complete.

In 1881 he became the Director of the Spanish Fine Arts Academy in Rome, but resigned from this post after two years. He traveled, mostly in Italy, portraying local themes and people. In 1897 he returned to Madrid as the director of the Museo del Prado. He held this position only briefly and then focused again on painting.

His total output is well over 1,000 paintings showing his interest in a variety of subjects and styles, often without regard of the current fashion. He is primarily recognized for his historical paintings; the last one completed in 1910 carries one of the longer titles of a major painting, Cortejo del bautizo del Príncipe Don Juan, hijo de los Reyes Católicos, por las calles de Sevilla (Retinue of the Baptism of Don Juan, son of the Catholic Monarchs, Along the Streets of Seville). An earlier example is The Sigh of the Moor, which depicts Muhammad XI, the last Nasrid ruler of Granada, turning to take his last look at the city from the Puerto del Suspiro del Moro before going into exile.

Much more common, however, are costumbristas—often romanticized studies that show local customs or manners—and landscapes that are often sketchy, with impressionistic influences. Financial duress after the bankruptcy of his bank may have imposed a special need to be productive.

== Gallery ==
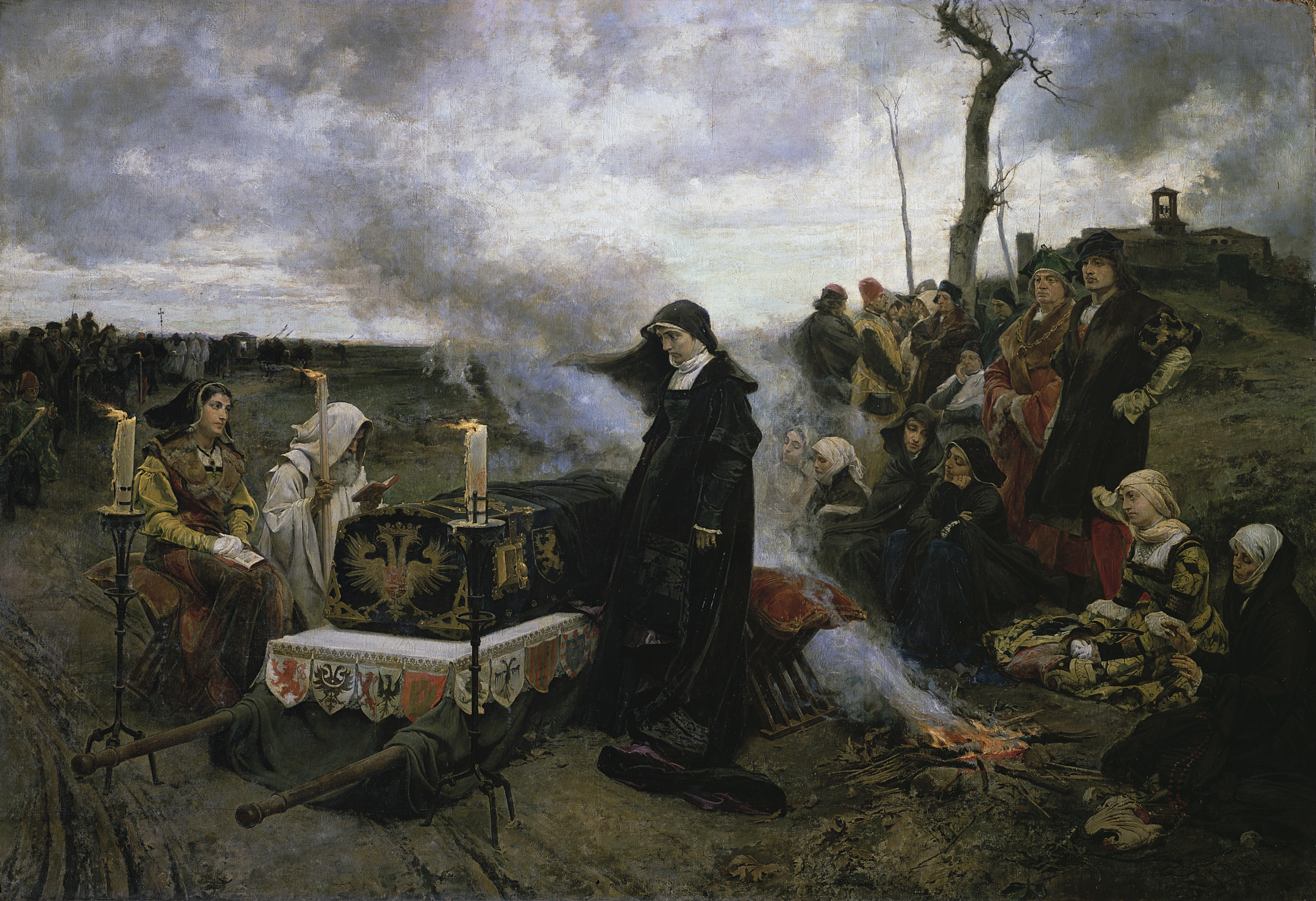
Doña Juana La Loca (Museo del Prado, 1877), showing Juana the Mad holding vigil over the coffin of her late husband,
Philip the Handsome

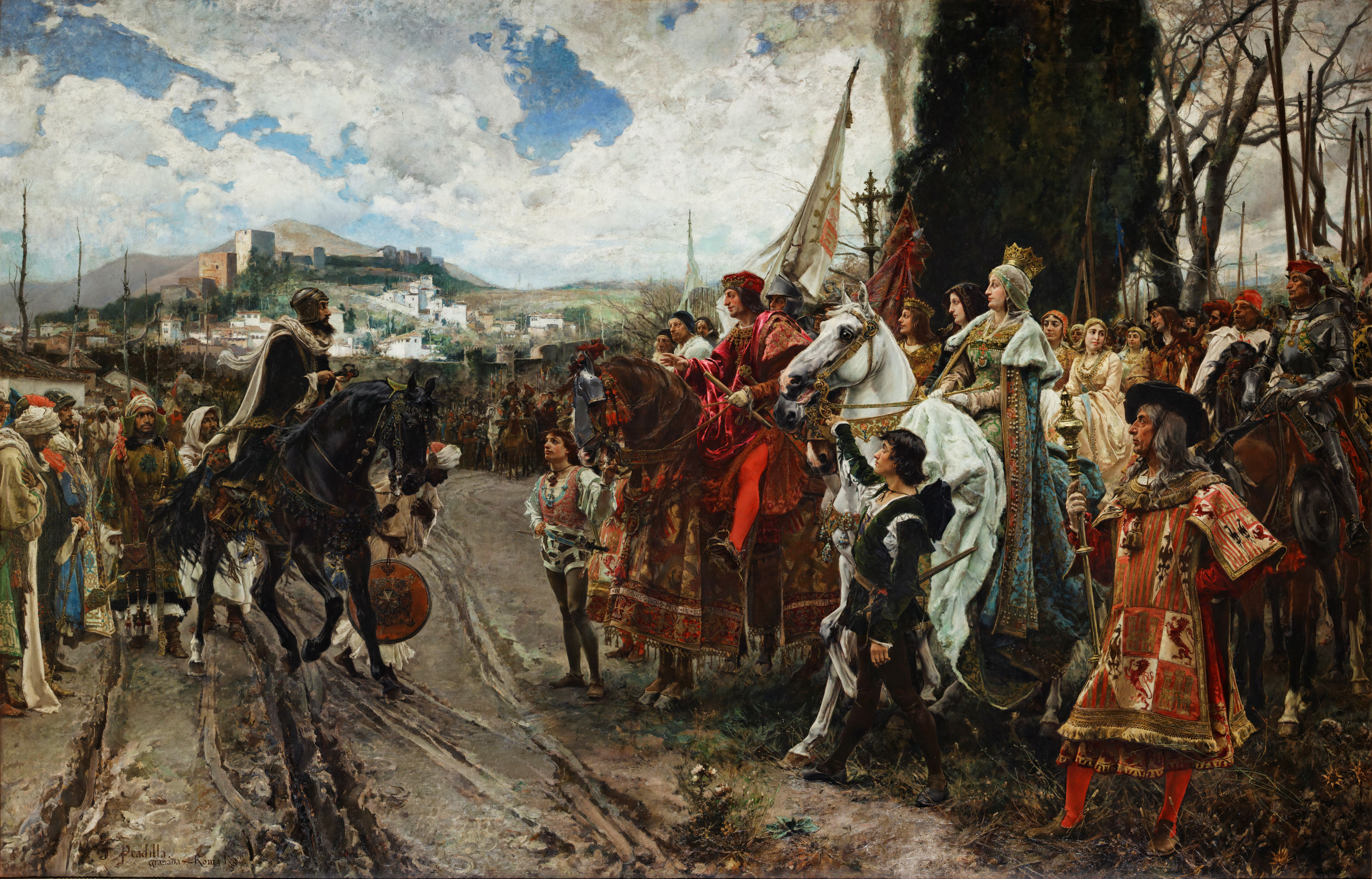
The Surrender of Granada (1882), showing Muhammad XI confronting Ferdinand and Isabella

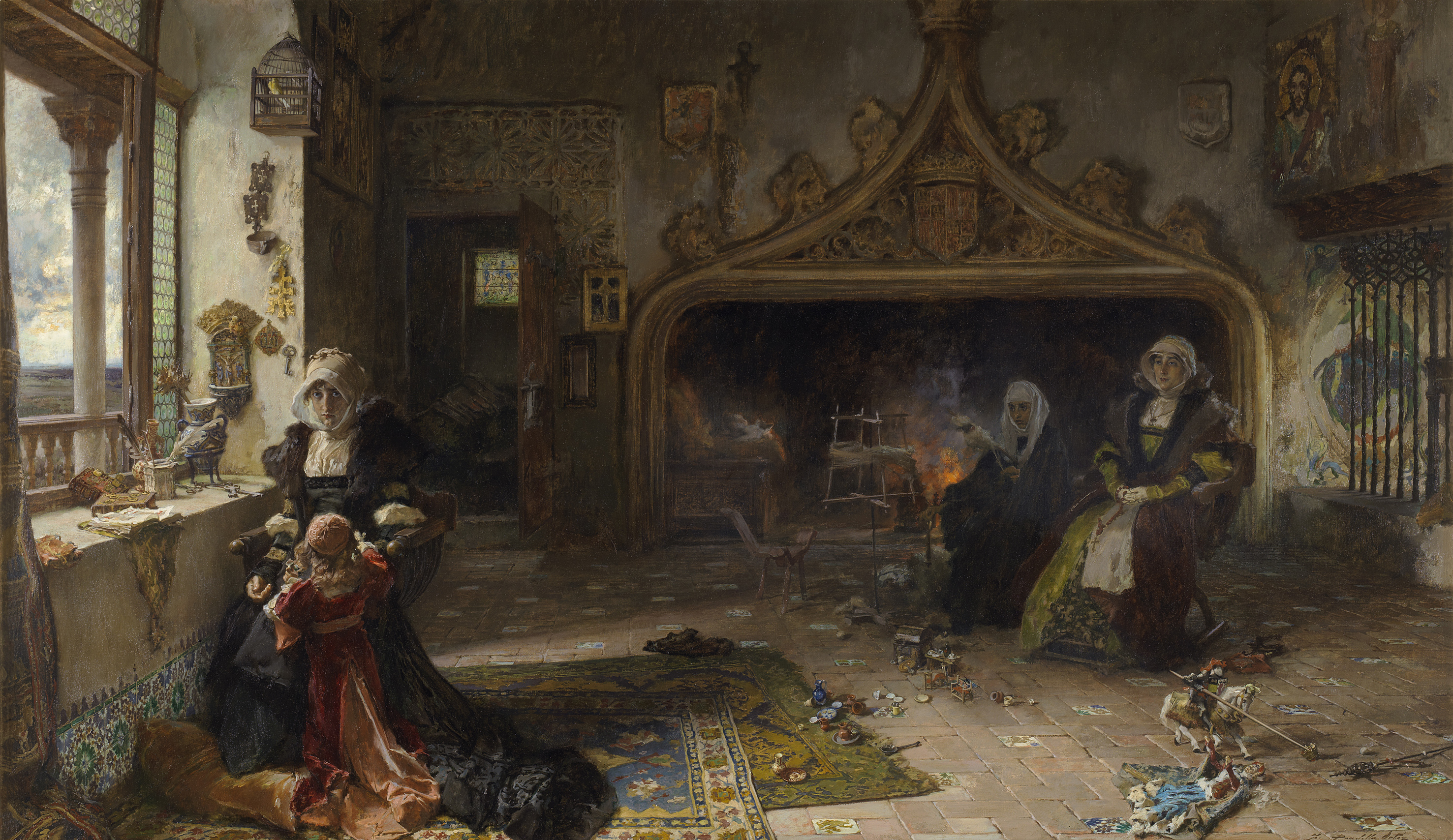
Juana the Mad imprisoned in Tordesillas with her daughter, the infanta Catalina
(Museo del Prado, 1906)

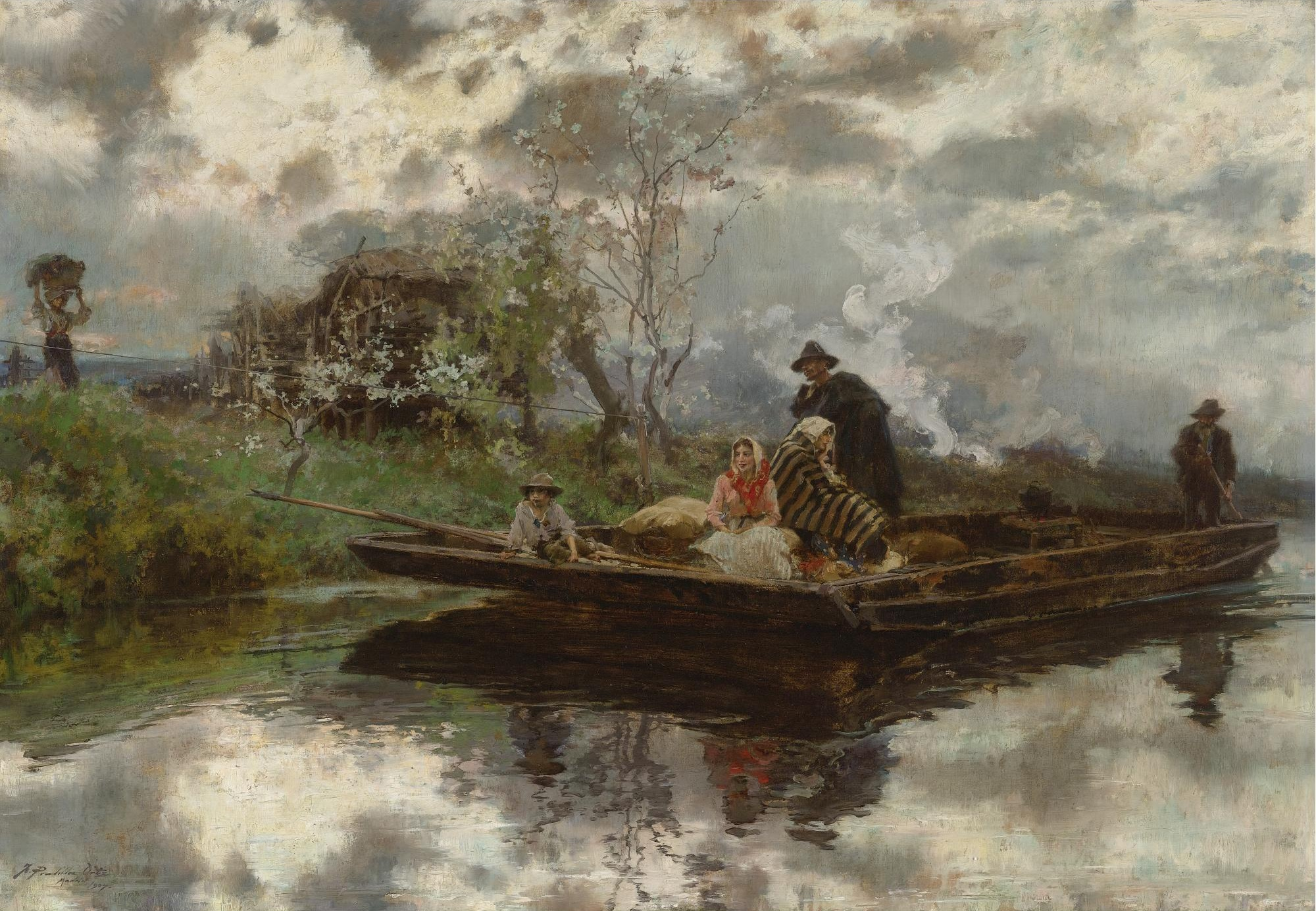
Spring Fog in Italy (1907)

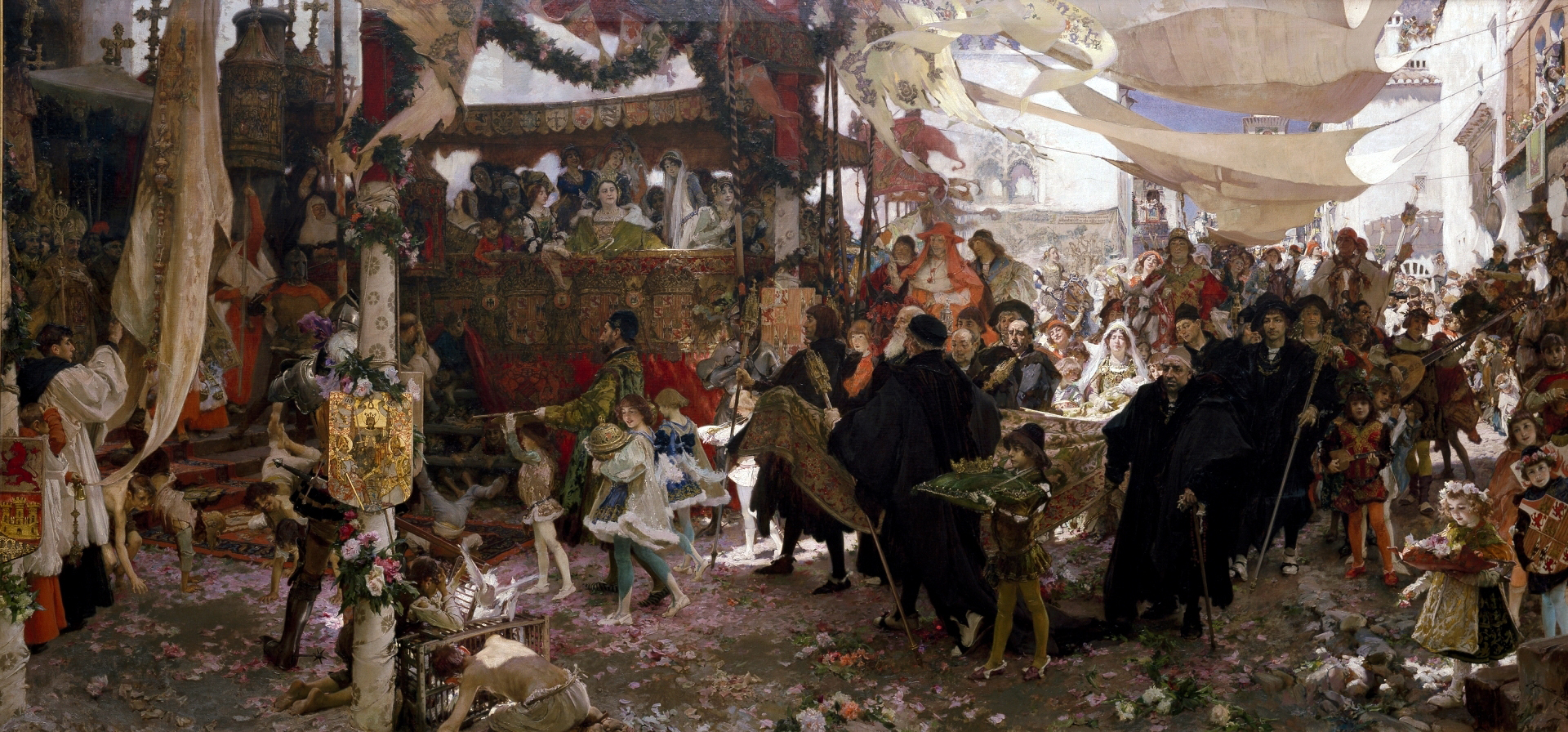
The Baptism of Prince John
(Museo del Prado, 1910)

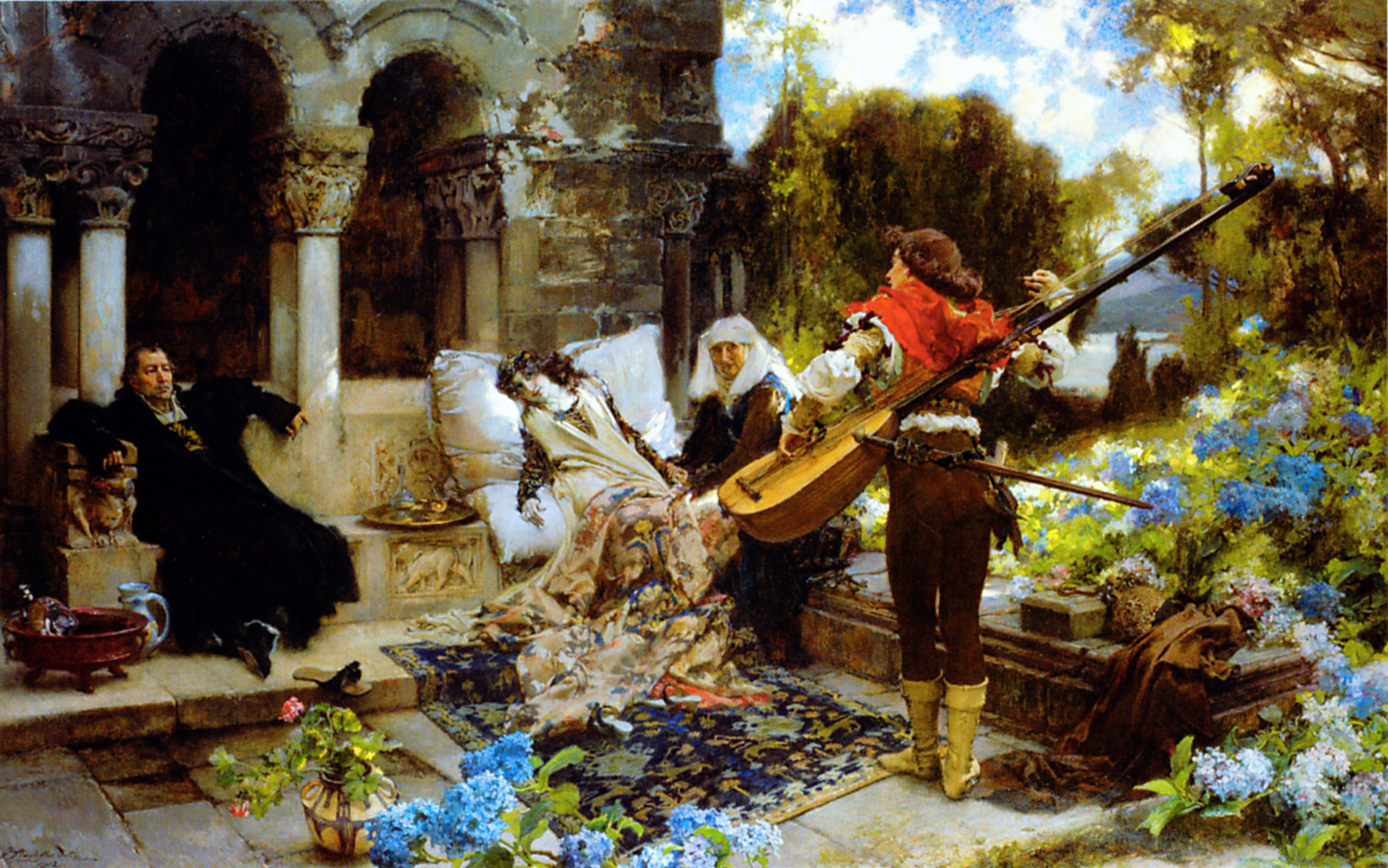
Lovesickness (1912)

== Sources ==
- Drayson, Elizabeth (2021). Lost Paradise: The Story of Granada. London: Head of Zeus. ISBN 978-1-78854-7437.
- Pradilla y Ortiz in the Gran Enciclopedia Aragonesa
