= Doña Joanna the Mad =

1877 painting by Francisco Pradilla Ortiz

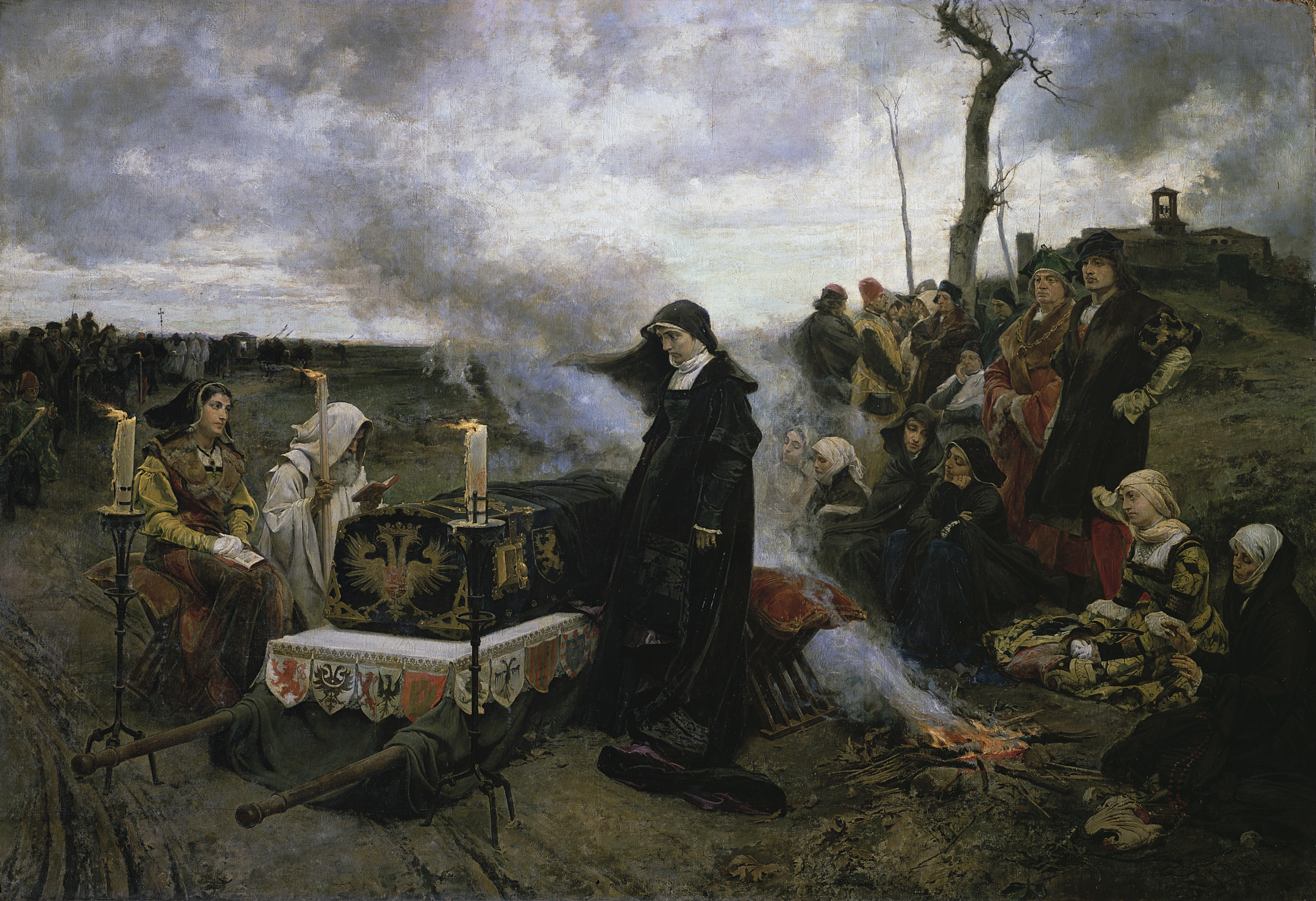
Doña Juana "la Loca" (1877) by Francisco Pradilla

Doña Juana la Loca (transl. Queen Joanna the Mad) is an 1877 oil on canvas painting by the Spanish painter Francisco Pradilla. It is now in the Museo del Prado in Madrid, Spain.

The painting was created and sent from Rome, and it was so successful that many copies of the original were eventually made. The painting is an example of the Spanish historical painting genre. It obtained the medal of honor in the National Exposition of Fine Arts (Spanish: Exposición Nacional de Bellas Artes) of 1878, as well as having success in the Universal Expositions of Paris in 1878, as well as that of Berlin.

In the painting, Pradilla represents Joanna of Castile watching over the casket of her dead husband, Philip I of Castile. She stands upright with an expression of emptiness on her lean face and hands clenched at her side. Around her, the courtiers gather with varied expressions. Philip I of Castile died suddenly of typhoid fever, and it was said she carried his casket around with her everywhere, believing one day he would wake from slumber. This depicts a common ritual for her, and the courtiers faces all have looks of boredom and fatigue.
