= Francisco Jover y Casanova =

Spanish painter (1836–1890)

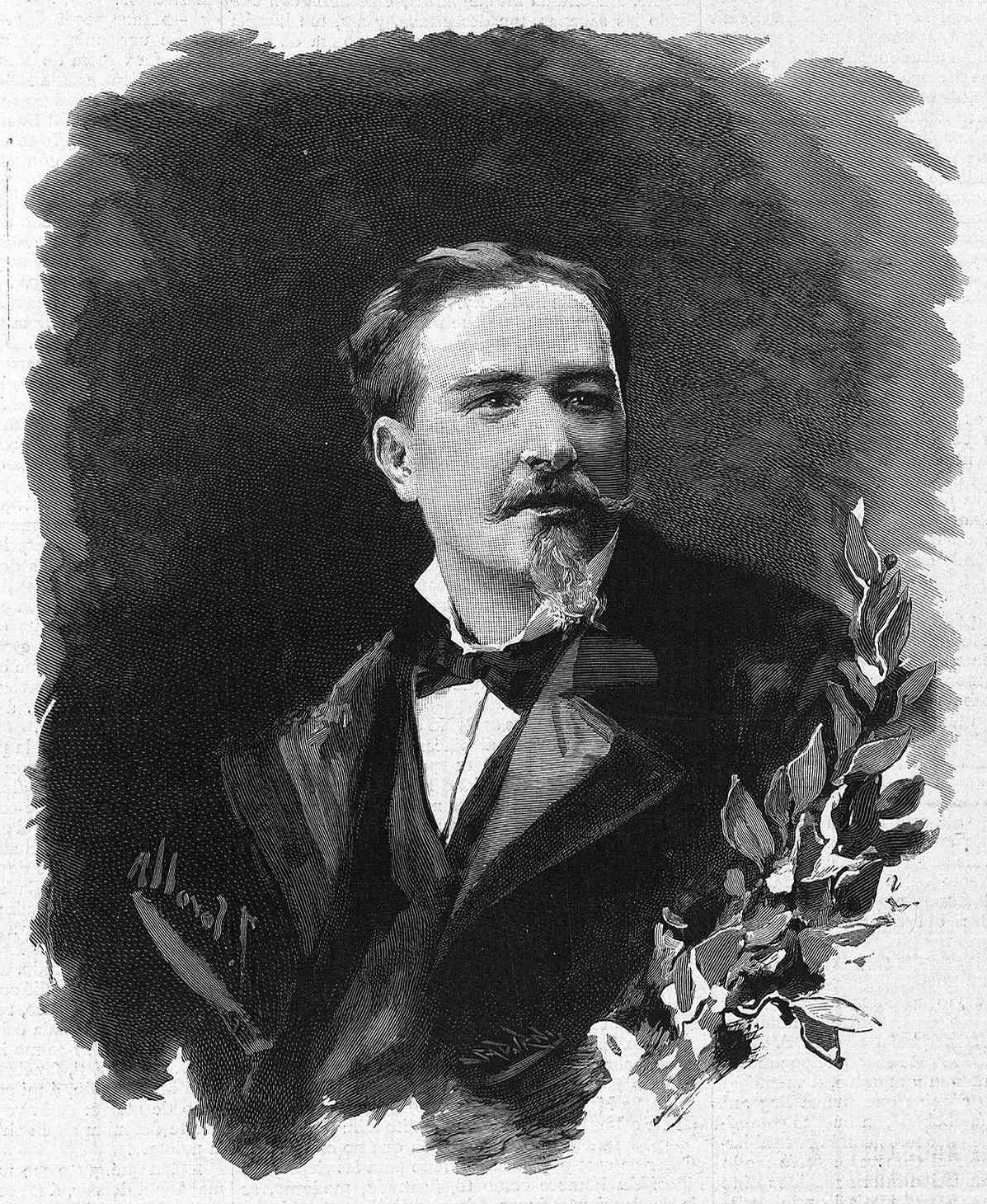
Francisco Jover y Casanova, from La Ilustración Artística; after a painting by Joaquín Sorolla

Francisco Jover y Casanova (1836, Muro de Alcoy - 19 February 1890, Madrid) was a Spanish painter of historical scenes and portraits.

== Biography ==
After beginning his artistic studies in his hometown, he attended the Real Academia de Bellas Artes de San Fernando in Madrid, where he studied with Federico de Madrazo. After winning a third-class medal at the National Exhibition of Fine Arts in 1864, he received a government stipend to study in Rome at the Accademia Chigi. He also was a frequent visitor to the studios of Mariano Fortuny, who had a great influence on his style.

His painting of the Pontifical Court was awarded a gold medal. Many of the works he created there were sent home for exhibitions and received awards. His portrayal of the "Conquest of Oran" was purchased by the government and displayed in the Senate conference room.

Upon returning to Spain, he settled permanently in Madrid and became in involved in teaching, as well as painting. He also participated in a major project at the Basilica of San Francisco el Grande, together with Casto Plasencia, Salvador Martínez Cubells and Manuel Domínguez Sánchez, among others.

He also created the frescoes in the expiatory chapel at the church of San Antonio de Padua, Aranjuez, and bought the ruins of the Real monasterio de Nuestra Señora de Fresdelval, with the intent of promoting and paying for their restoration. A monumental canvas, named "Represalias" (Retaliation), and some smaller works, remained unfinished at the time of his death. A few were completed by Joaquín Sorolla, per his wishes.

== Selected paintings ==
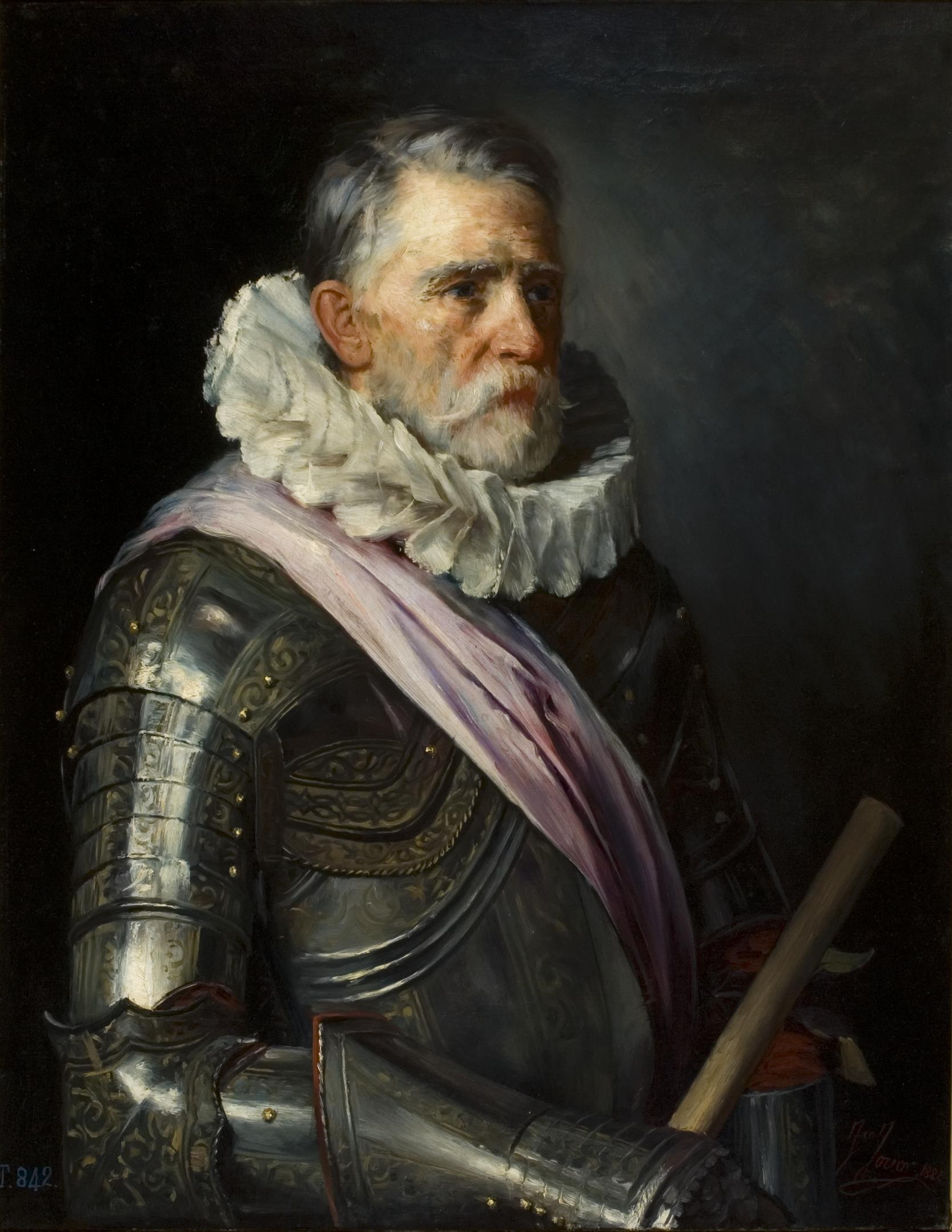
Luis de Requesens y Zúñiga

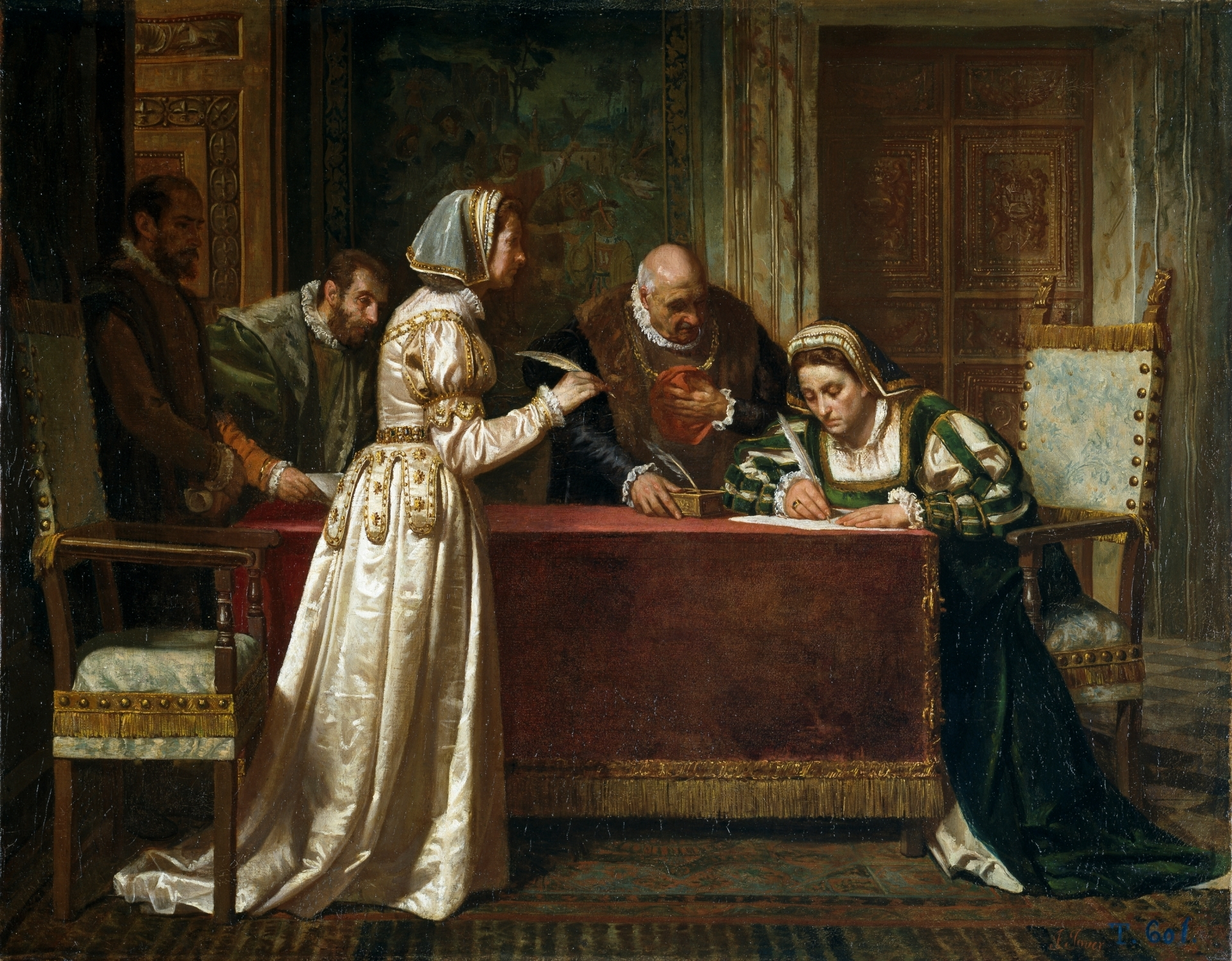
The Treaty of Cambrai

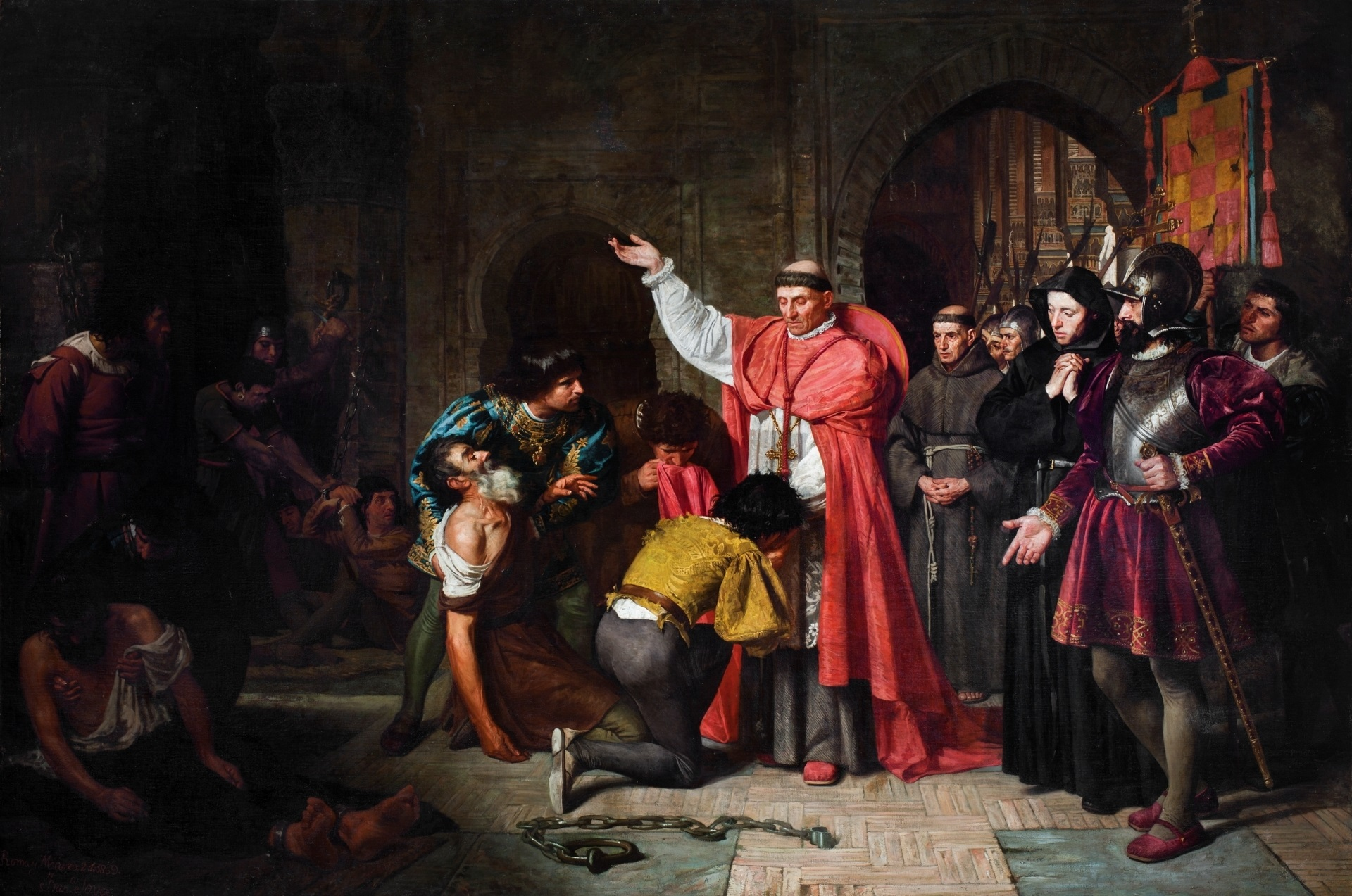
Cardinal Cisneros, Liberating the Captives in Oran

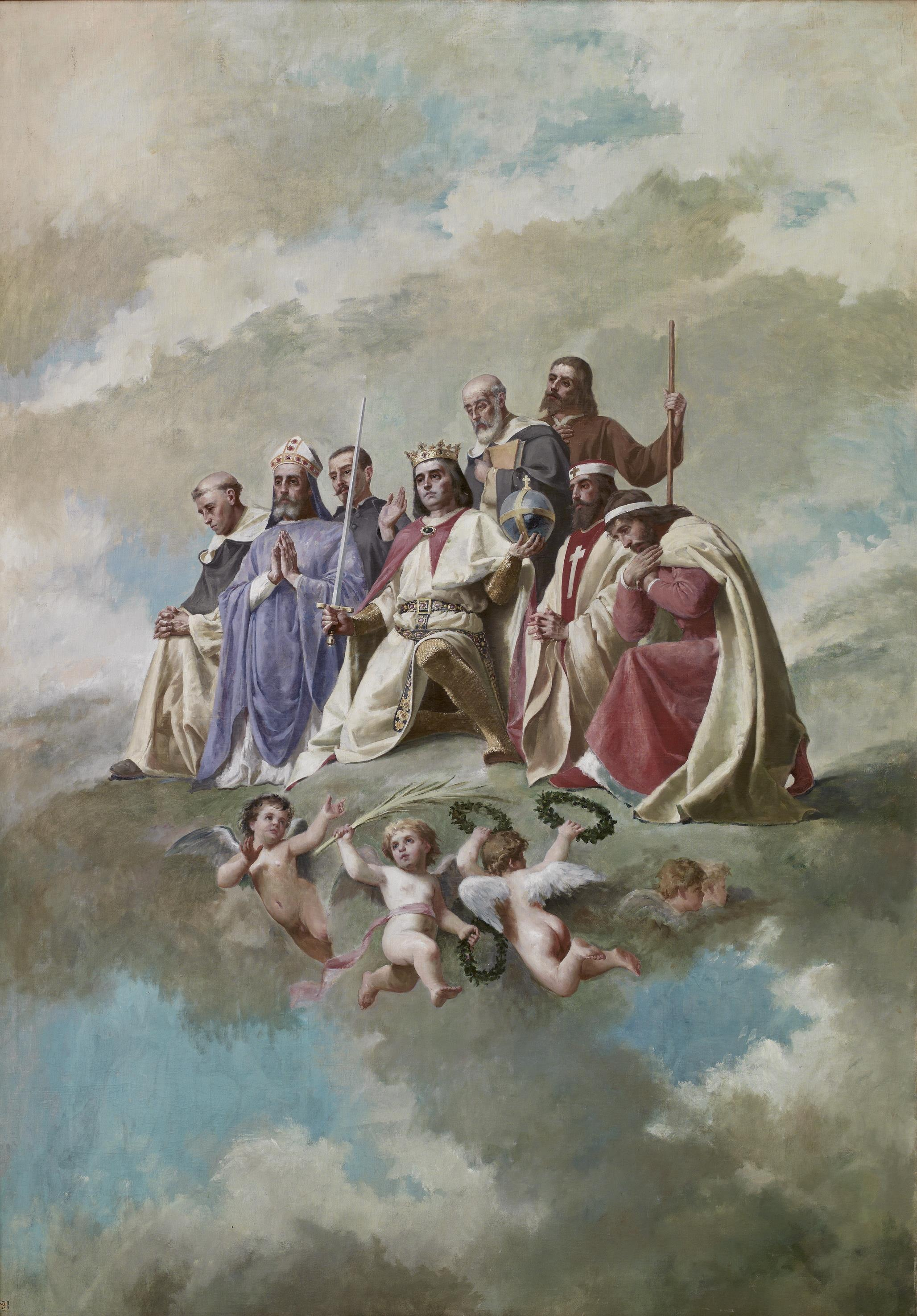
Spanish Saints
