= Ricardo Villodas y de la Torre =

Spanish painter

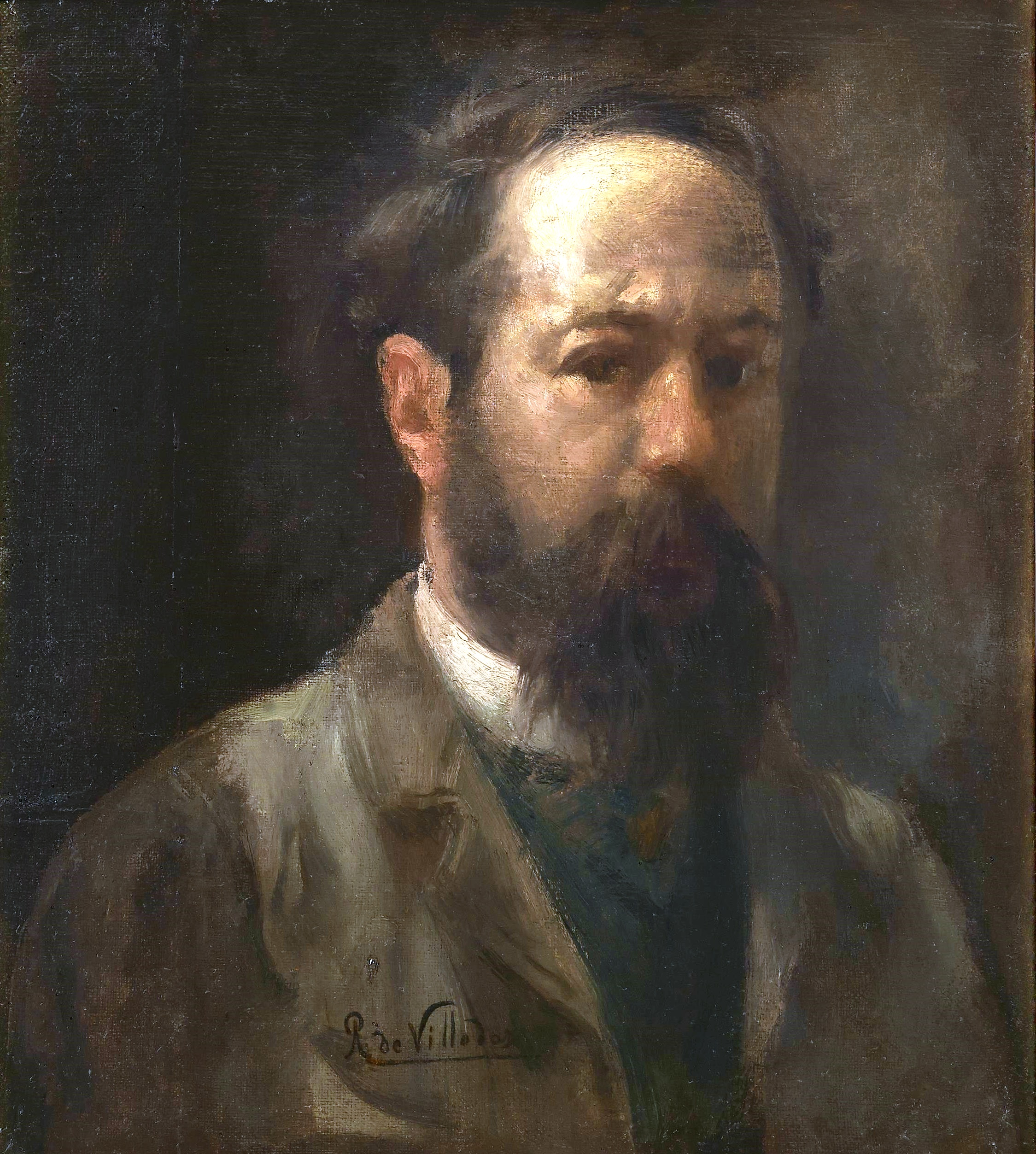
Self-portrait (c. 1890)

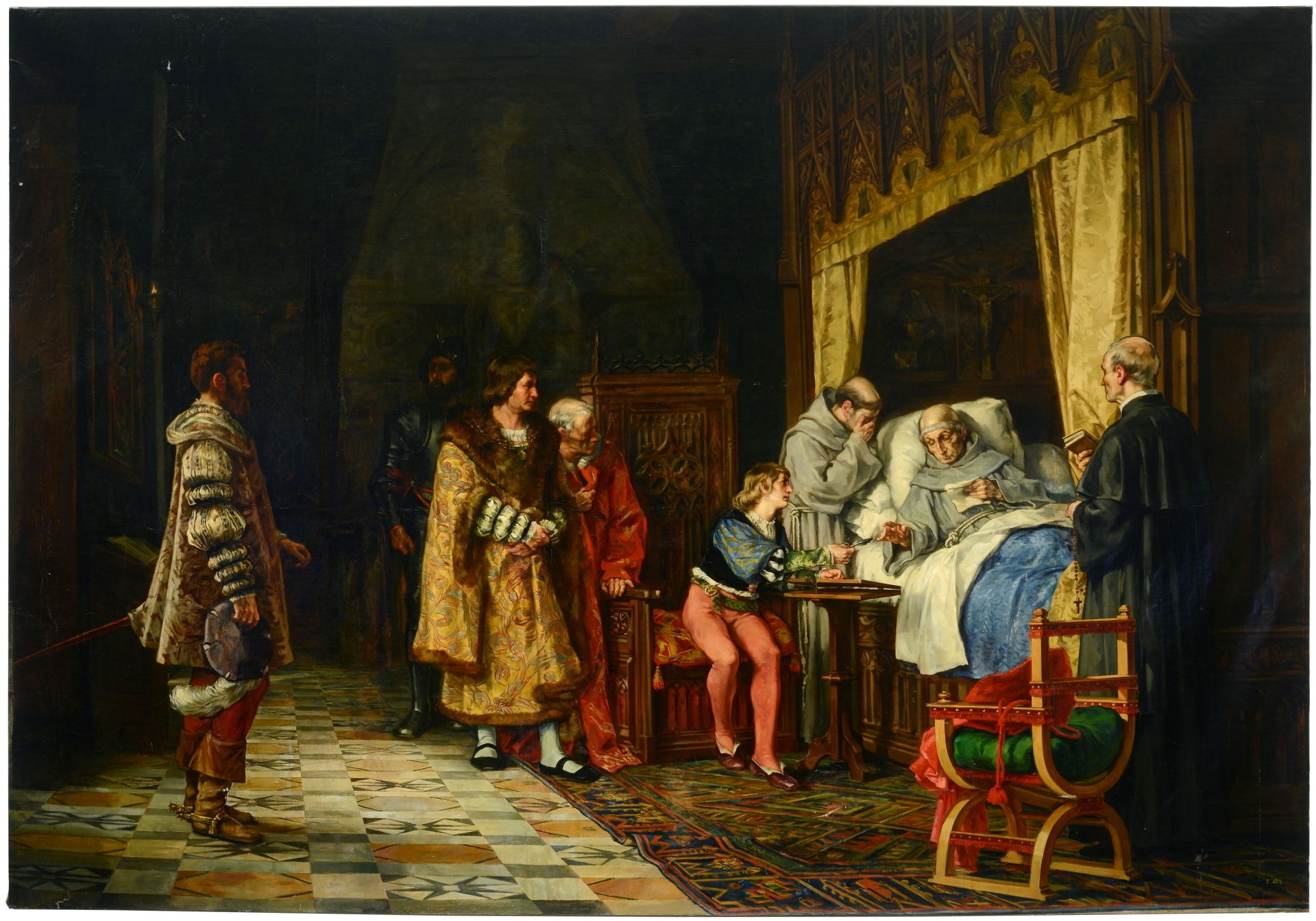
A Message from Carlos I to Cardinal Cisneros

Ricardo Villodas y de la Torre (23 February 1846, Madrid – 6 August 1904, Soria) was a Spanish painter best known for his classical and historical scenes.

== Biography ==
He began his studies at the Real Academia de Bellas Artes de San Fernando, with Federico de Madrazo, Carlos Luis de Ribera and Alejandro Ferrant. After receiving a Third Class medal at the Exposición Regional de Zaragoza, he went to study in Paris, where one of his fellow students was Federico's son, Raimundo.

Upon returning to Madrid, he became a regular participant in the National Exhibition of Fine Arts, where he was awarded Second Class prizes for "The Death of Caesar' in 1876 and "A Message from Carlos I to Cardinal Cisneros" in 1877. The latter work was also presented at the Exposition Universelle (1878) in Paris.

As a result of these awards, he was able to attend the Spanish Academy in Rome where he took classes with José Casado del Alisal. He also attended the Accademia Chigi and was employed in the workshops of José Villegas Cordero and Lorenzo Vallés. He would be a resident of Rome for almost twenty years, altogether. During this time, King Alfonso XII named him a Knight in the Order of Charles III. Some Orientalist works indicate that he may have visited North Africa.

He continued to participate in the National Exhibitions, and was awarded the First Class prize in 1887 for "Victoribus Gloria" (To the Winners, the Glory), depicting a naumachia from the time of Augustus. He also exhibited at the Exposition Universelle (1889), where he was given a Second Class medal and, that same year, at the Münchener Jahresausstellung von Kunstwerken aller Nationen, where he received a First Class medal and the Golden Cross of the Order of Saint Michael.

== Sources ==
- Biography @ the Museo del Prado
- Biography @ the Real Academia de la Historia
