= Eduardo Chicharro y Agüera =

Spanish painter (1873–1949)

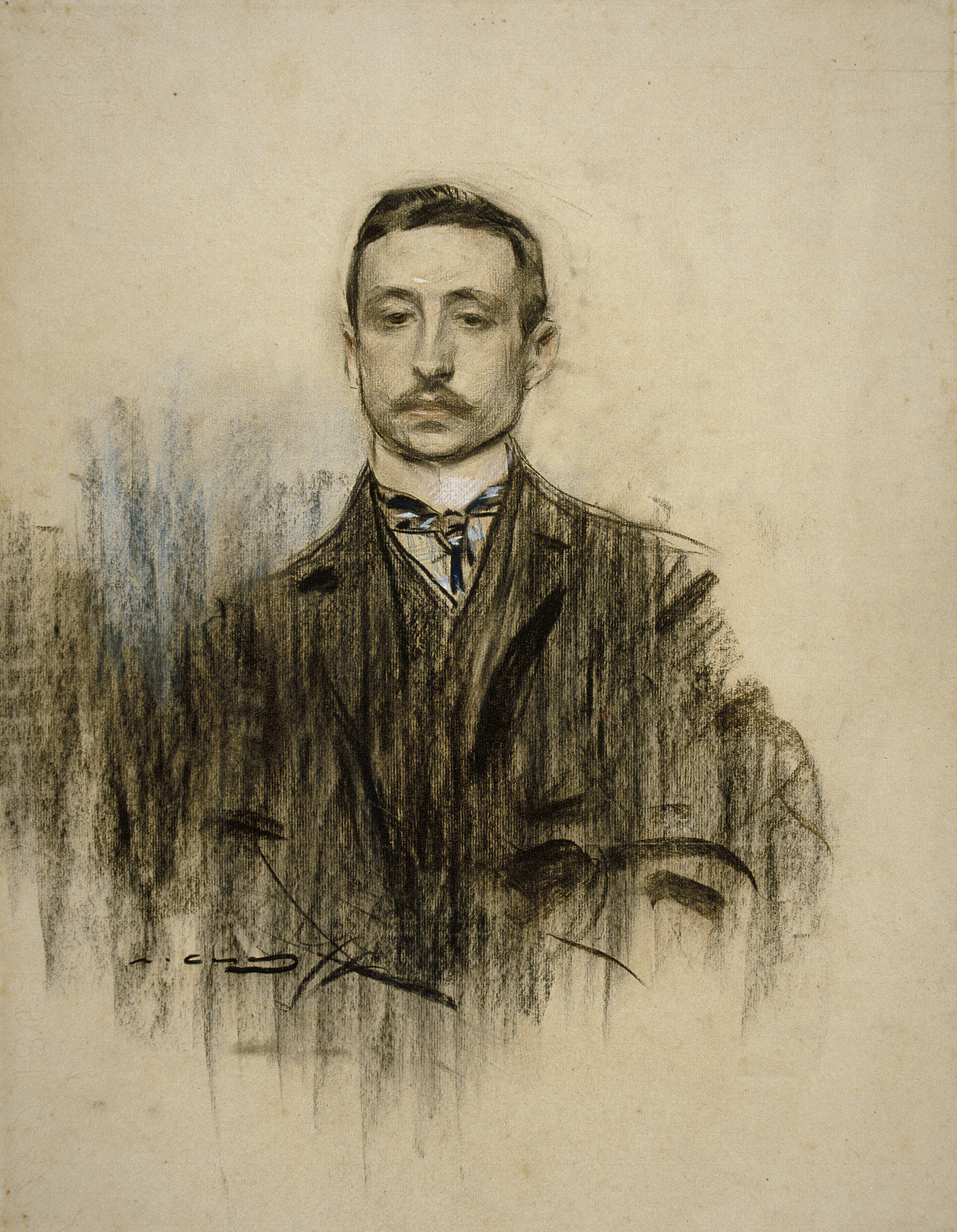
Eduardo Chicharro y Agüera; Portrait by Ramón Casas

The Poem of Armida and Rinaldo (detail)

Eduardo Chicharro y Agüera (18 June 1873, Madrid - 24 May 1949, Madrid) was a Spanish painter. He worked in a variety of genres, but is perhaps best known for his female portraits. His son was the poet, Eduardo Chicharro Briones.

== Biography ==
His father was a craftsman and glazier. Although he died when Eduardo was only two years old, his passion for art left a mark that Eduardo's mother encouraged. While still very young, he began classes at the School of Arts and Crafts then, at the age of fifteen, entered the Real Academia de Bellas Artes de San Fernando, where he was a student of Joaquín Sorolla, Manuel Domínguez Sánchez and Carlos de Haes. He would later cite De Haes as the major influence on his style.

He participated in numerous exhibitions, both national and international. In 1896, he received honorable mention at the National Exhibition of Fine Arts and, in 1899, a Second Class prize for "Uveras" (grape sellers), In 1900, thanks to a scholarship, he was able to study at the Spanish Academy in Rome.

In 1904, he received a First Class prize at the National Exhibition for "The Poem of Arminda and Rinaldo", a three-panel work depicting characters from Jerusalem Delivered by Torquato Tasso. That same year, he married María Briones and went to live in Ávila. He was the recipient of another First Class prize in 1908 for "The Three Wives". His international showings included expositions in Munich and Liège.

In 1910, he founded the Asociación de Pintores y Escultores and served as its first President. Two years later, the Asociación established an annual "Salón de otoño", modeled after the Salon d'Automne of Paris, which had been created in 1903.

That same year (1912), he came back to Rome as Director of the Spanish Academy, the Italian branch of the Real Academia de San Fernando. He and his family would remain in Rome until 1925. While there, he developed an interest in Indian culture and the works of Rabindranath Tagore; producing what he considered one of his finest works, "The Temptation of Buddha".

In 1926, Chicharro y Agüera's "Pygmalion" was presented by the Spanish government to the International Labour Office in Geneva. Later in 1936, the painting was placed in the Correspondents Room of the Centre William Rappard, but the ILO Deputy-Director Harold Butler requested that it be removed. Refusing to take it off from the wall to avoid damages, the architect Georges Epitaux covered the canvas with wood panels. Seventy-one years later, "Pygmalion" was re-discovered in 2007 and displayed again to the public.

Upon returning to Madrid, he worked as a Professor at the Escuela Superior de Bellas Artes. At the beginning of the Spanish Second Republic, he was appointed Inspector General of the School of Arts and Crafts and, in 1934, became Director. During the Spanish Civil War, he lived with his friend, the painter, Luis Gallardo Pérez, who influenced him to brighten his color palette. At the war's conclusion, he reassumed his previous positions. He was awarded the Civil Order of Alfonso X, the Wise in 1944.
