= UMusic Hotel Madrid =

Music-themed hotel in Madrid

Coordinates: 40°24′55″N 3°42′14″W

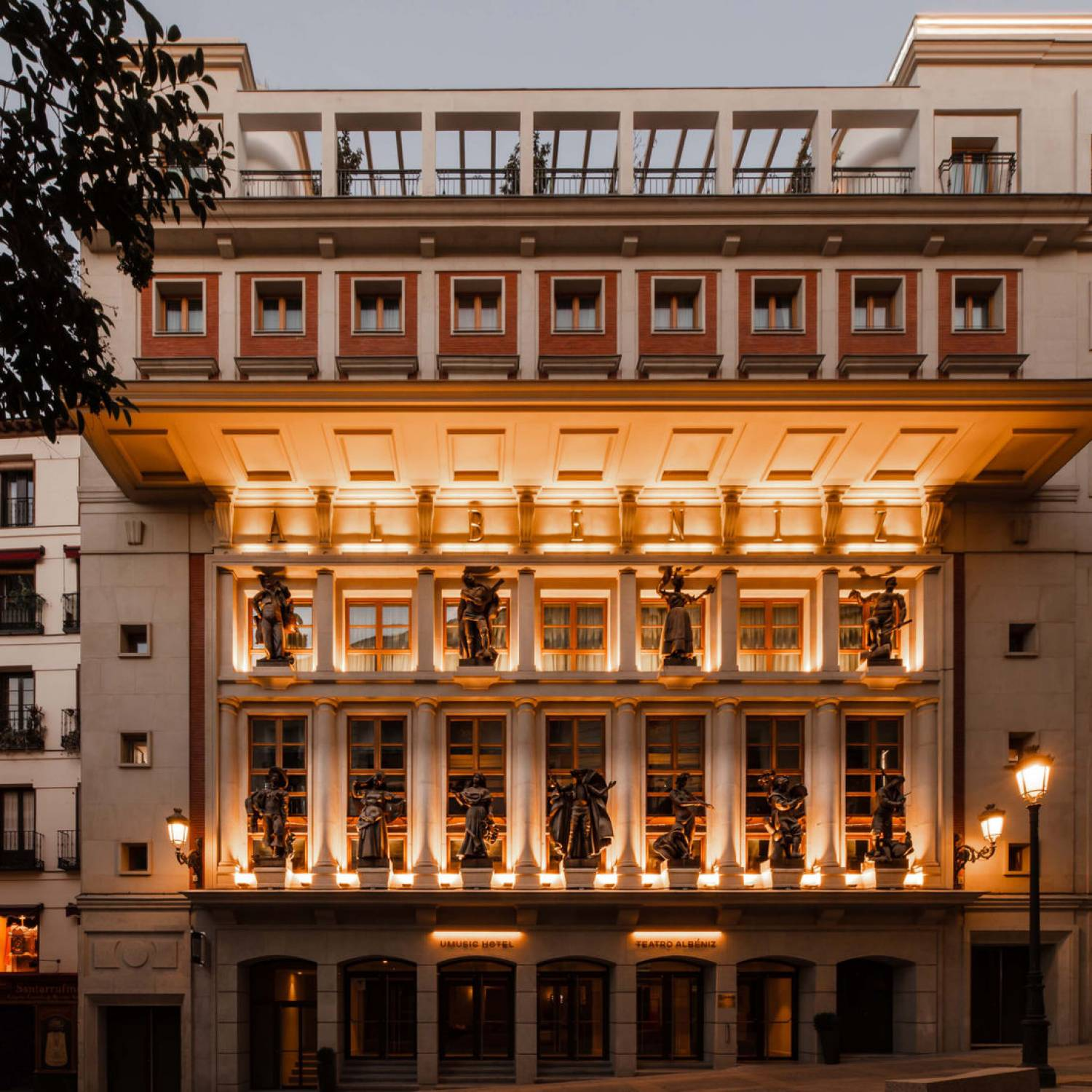
UMusic Hotel Madrid main facade on Calle de la Paz

UMusic Hotel Madrid is a five-star hotel located in the Centro district of Madrid, Spain. Opened in November 2022, it is the debut property for UMusic Hotels, a joint venture between Universal Music Group and Dakia U-Ventures. The property is a restoration project that integrated the historic Teatro Albéniz into a luxury hotel complex.

== Building and restoration ==
The hotel occupies two structures on Calle de la Paz: the former Hotel Madrid and the Teatro Albéniz. The site was historically the location of the Royal Printing House (Real Imprenta) in the 18th century.

The redevelopment combined the former Hotel Madrid and Teatro Albéniz into a single complex. The renovation was designed by the architectural firm Ruiz Barbarín Arquitectos (Arquimanía). Because the hotel was developed around the theater's fly tower, the interior layout features varying floor levels throughout the complex.

As part of the project, the theater's facade was restored to its 1940s appearance. This included the reinstatement of the original wooden "automata" sculptures created by artist Ángel Ferrant. Of the eleven original figures, eight were successfully restored and placed on the theater's balcony.

== Facilities ==
The hotel contains 130 guest rooms and suites, including a duplex "Artist's Suite." The interior design incorporates musical elements, such as record players in rooms and a "vibe manager" to curate the hotel's soundtrack. The property is a member of the Preferred Hotels & Resorts network and was recognized with a TripAdvisor Travelers' Choice award in 2024.

The hotel incorporates the historic 898-seat Teatro Albéniz, which serves as its primary cultural and entertainment venue. Reopening in November 2022 after a 14-year closure, the theater debuted with the Spanish premiere of the musical Company, directed by and starring Antonio Banderas. Since reopening, the venue has hosted musical theater productions and live events.

Additional amenities include a rooftop pool and the UMusic Piano Bar Casa Chicote.
