= Tomás García Sampedro =

Spanish painter (1860–1937)

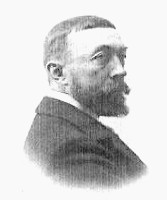
Tomás García Sampedro

Tomás García Sampedro (17 May 1860 – 1937) was a Spanish painter; primarily of landscapes and rural scenes, in costumbrista style.

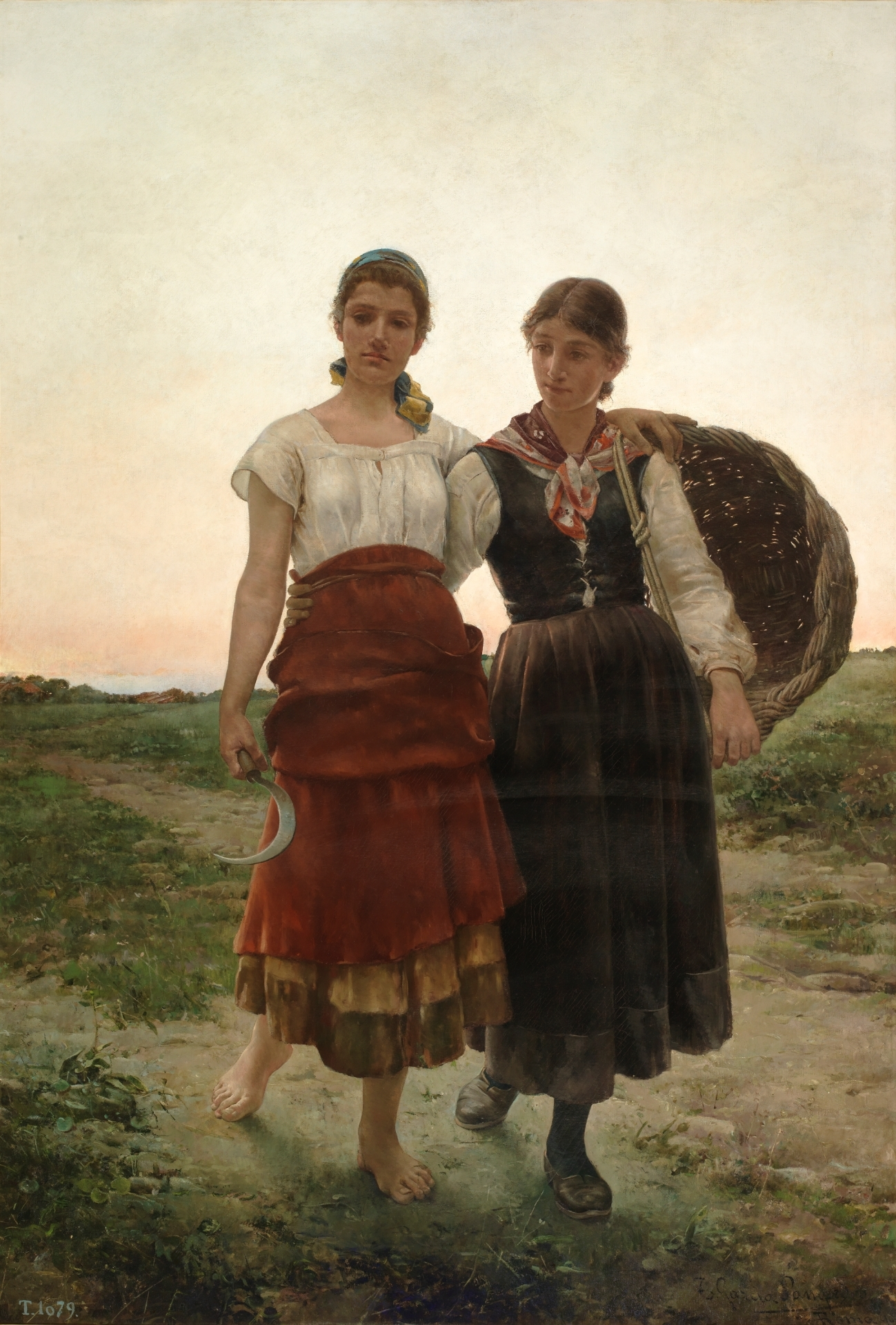
At the Fall of Evening

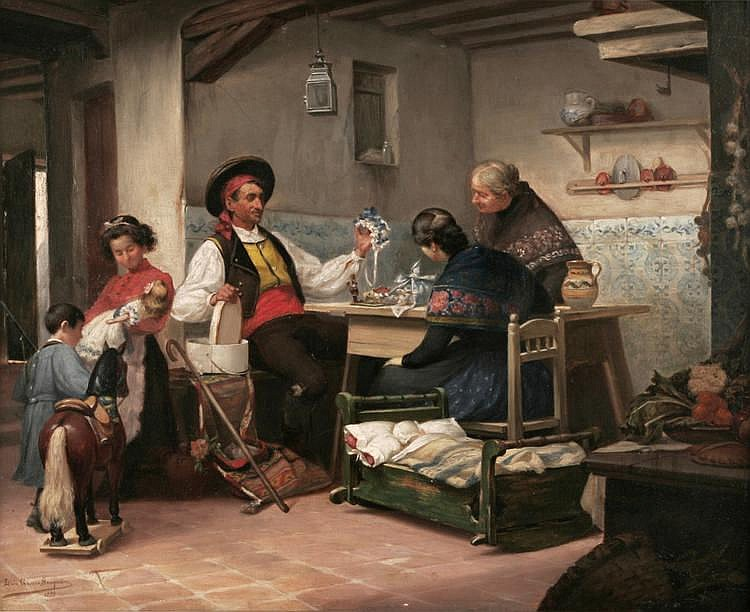
The Bonnet

== Biography ==
Tomás García Sampedro was born in Pravia to a rural, peasant family. After attending a religious school there, he received his advanced degree at a private school in Oviedo. He moved to Santiago de Compostela in 1876, to study pharmacology, and received his license to practice in 1880. That same year, he published his first drawings in La Ilustración Gallega y Asturiana, and moved to Madrid.

There, he enrolled at the "Escuela Especial de Pintura, Escultura y Grabado" (a division of the Real Academia de Bellas Artes de San Fernando), visited the Museo del Prado, and attended meetings of the Círculo de Bellas Artes, where he made friends with one of its founders, Casto Plasencia, who would become his mentor.

In the summer of 1884, he invited Plasencia and several other members of the Círculo, to visit his family's farm. This resulted in the creation of what came to be known as the "Colonia artística de Muros". Its original members, in addition to Plasencia, included Alfredo Perea, Tomás Campuzano and José Robles Martínez. The group continued to meet every summer for six years, until the sudden death of Plasencia in May 1890. Nevertheless, the site's fame assured that it would continue to be visited by notable artists, including Joaquín Sorolla, Cecilio Plá and Juan Antonio Benlliure.

In 1886, he was awarded a stipend from the provincial government in Oviedo, to help finance further studies in Rome. Later, thanks to critical praise for several of his works, the stipend was extended, allowing him to tour Italy and France, and spend his summers at home with his group. With "At the Fall of Evening", painted in Rome in 1889, he was awarded a third-class medal at the Exposición Nacional de Bellas Artes in 1890. It was acquired by the Ministry of the Interior, and may now be seen at the Museo del Prado.

Ill and out of money, he returned home in 1892 and settled in his native village, although he continued to travel; visiting Madrid, Barcelona and Paris for extended periods. In 1897, his entry at the Exposición Nacional, The Banks of the Nalón, earned him a Knighthood in the Order of Charles III. He also created a portrait of King Alfonso XIII, as a child, for the Casino Español in Guantánamo, Cuba. In 1899, he painted The Asturian Reaper, which was awarded a silver medal at the Exposición Regional of Gijón in 1905. That same year, he was named a corresponding member of the Academia de San Fernando.

He died at his combination home and studio in Muros de Nalón in 1937, aged seventy-seven.

== Sources ==
- Biography in the Diccionario biográfico español @ the Real Academia de la Historia
- Javier Barón Thaidigsmann, Pintura asturiana del siglo XIX. Museo de Bellas Artes de Asturias. Oviedo, 2007
- Juan Fernández de la Llana Granda, "Tomás García Sampedro e Ignacio Suárez Llanos", in: Pintores asturianos. vol. IX; Oviedo, Banco Herrero, 1979.
