= Ángel Ferrant =

Spanish sculptor

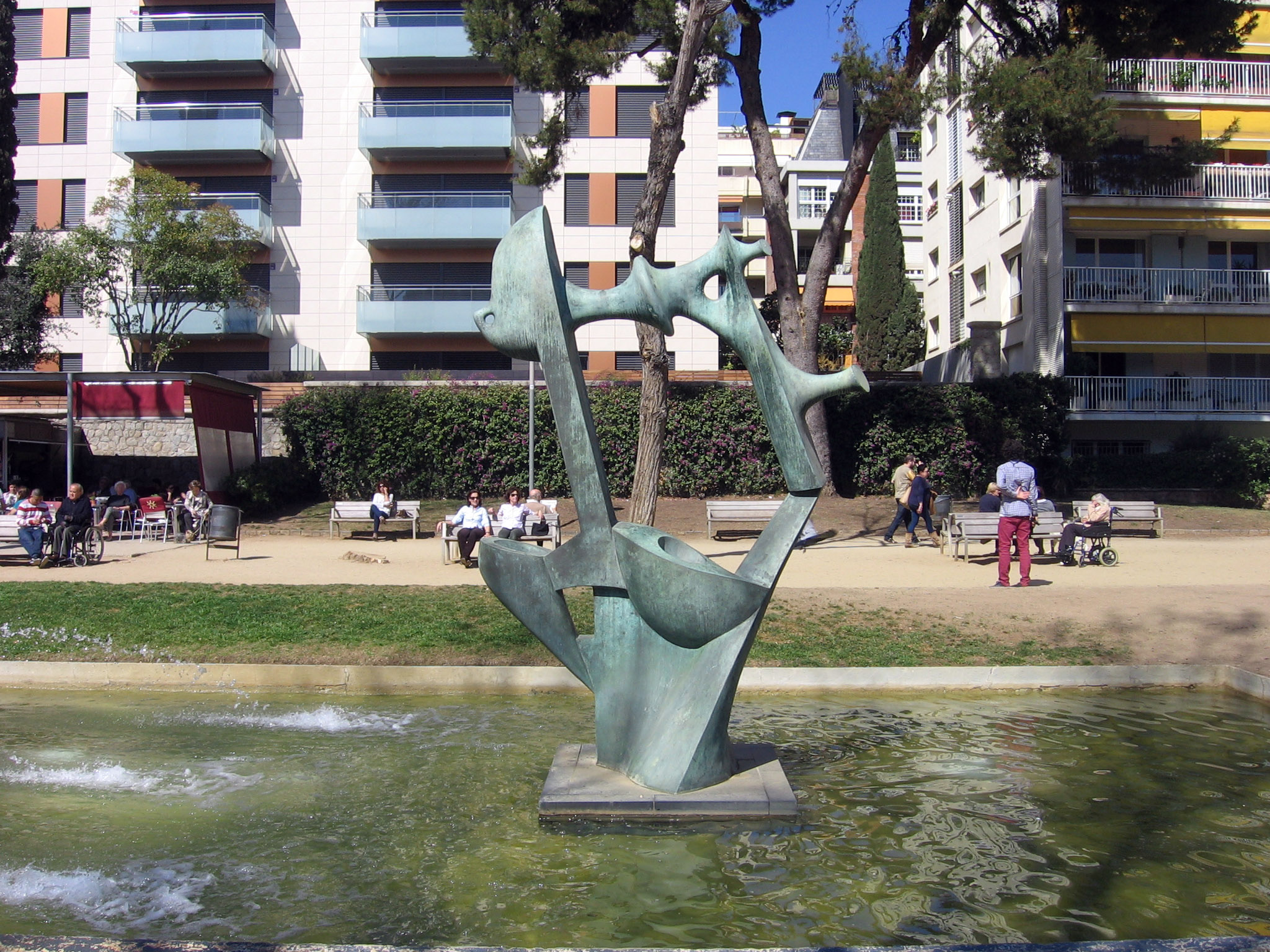
- Born: 1 December 1890; Barcelonès, Spain
- Died: 23 July 1961(aged 70); Madrid, Spain
- Known for: Sculpture

Ángel Ferrant Vázquez (1 December 1890 – 23 July 1961) was an avant-garde Spanish sculptor associated with surrealism and kinetic art.

== Biography and works ==
Son of the painter Alejandro Ferrant, he studied sculpture at the Escuela de Artes y Oficios in Madrid, the Real Academia de Bellas Artes de San Fernando, and at sculptor Aniceto Marinas’ studio. His first works fit into the academic realism of the new century and have hints of an aesthetic trend called tremendismo which uses realism to shock. The most outstanding one is La cuesta de la vida (Museo del Prado) for which he won the second medal at the Exposición Nacional de Bellas Artes in 1910. In 1913 he travelled to Paris where he came into contact with futurism and although he wasn't a futurist in the strict sense, the influence of Marinetti, with whom he had an epistolary relationship, contributed to the evolution of his sculpture.

When he obtained the position of sculpture and casting teacher, he was assigned to the Escuela de Artes y Oficios in A Coruña. He lived there for two years and then, in 1920 he was transferred to the Escola de la Llotja in Barcelona. He stayed there until 1934, when he established himself permanently as a teacher at the Escuela de Artes y Oficios in Madrid.

=== First contact with the avant-garde ===
In Barcelona, he approached the noucentisme and avant-garde artists, whose influence is shown in La escolar, for which he won the first prize at the National Competition of Sculpture in 1926. The Junta de Ampliación de Estudios gave him a scholarship and in 1927 he travelled to Vienna in order to update the pedagogical methods of the teaching of sculpture.

During these years he spent in Barcelona, he exhibited his works in various art galleries and with different groups, as for instance, the I Exposición de la Sociedad de Artistas Ibéricos, in which he presented two nudes influenced by primitive art, the Saló dels Evolucionistes, the Cercle Artístic de Sant Lluc, and the Asociación de Escultores and Amigos de las Artes Nuevas (ADLAN.), a group akin to surrealism founded in 1931 that had Ángel Ferrant as a very active member. In 1936 he participated in the Exposición Logicofobista in Barcelona, which was part of the surrealistic trend. His student Eduald Serra was also involved in this exposition. During these years, Ferrant started his investigation about objects, trying out new artistic material within the aesthetic of the objet trouvé. He also made contact with Alexander Calder, which had his Circo en miniatura exhibited by Amigos de las Nuevas Artes.

=== The Civil War and the Artistic Treasure Committee ===
When the war began, he signed the “Manifiesto de la Alianza de Intelectuales Antifascistas para la Defensa de la Cultura” published in the La voz newspaper on July 30, 1936. On early 1937, Ángel joined the Seizure, Protection and Rescue of the Artistic Treasure Committee which was set up on December 15, 1936, and had Roberto Fernández Balbuena as president and his brother Alejandro Ferrant as chairperson. One of his responsibilities as technical assistant was to organise photographic files from all Committee's works. He was also named provisional director of the Modern Art Museum around that time, since the former director Ricardo Gutiérrez Abascal moved to Valencia, and president of the Artistic Treasure Section of the Central Board of the Archives, Libraries and Artistic Treasure. These were positions that could truly exercised since the museum remained closed and the Central Board was an empty superstructure. Ángel was arrested in the Committee units by agents from the Servicio de Información Militar (Military Information Service) or SIM of the Ejército del Centro on May 27. The same agents which the night before arrested the architect Francisco Ordeig (responsible of the stores that the Junta de Incautación had in the Church of San Francisco el Grande), one of his sons and also the public employees from the committee and members of the National Republican Guard who were in charge of the custody of the art works that were there. There was an accusation on these members because of connivance with the enemy. All Ferrant brothers were released on May 30, after the intervention of Fernández Balbuena and other colleagues from the committee. They warned about exaggerations and forced interpretations of declarations heard by confidants in the accusations made by officers of the brigade. Apparently, there was no other reason for that arrest but their friendship with Ordeig, who was finally judged in Barcelona one year later.

Ángel was appointed as spokesperson of the Committee that was in charge of the different town tours and seizures in the center of the area, among others. In January 1938, after Fernández Balbuena's designation as representative of the Dirección General de Bellas Artes in Madrid and deputy director of the Museo del Prado, Ángel Ferrant was named president of the Artistic Treasure Board in Madrid. Its reticences to some officials from the Ministry requests and to the Fine Arts management were causing continuous arguments. Ángel presented his resignation in March, but soon he canceled it because he was unwilling to move The Descent from the Cross, of Rogier van der Weyden, to Valencia. In April 1938 Ángel Ferrant was asked to go to Barcelona, where he stayed until June leaving as responsible of the Committee Matilde López Serrano, a Francoist agent of the SIPM (Servicio de Información y Policía Militar). On September 6 those in charge of the Ministry of Finance, to which the competences of the Artistic Treasure were transferred, proceeded to reshuffle the Committees, headed by the civil governors. Ferrant became the technical assistant and had no executive functions.

=== Post-war ===
After the war, Ferrant and his brother were sued by the Duke of Valencia, whose properties had been saved thanks to the Committee of Madrid. In April, after facing disciplinary proceedings, Ferrant filed an exculpatory statement, in which he explained his actions towards the committee. In July, Pedro Muguruza, Commissioner-general of the Servicio de Defensa del Patrimonio Artístico Nacional, submitted a report to the Military Tribunal of Officials explaining the committee's role in the preservation of the patrimony in Madrid. After this dispute he retook the artistic creativity he had left during the war. In this context were highly significant the series of terracotta reliefs of Tauromaquia (Museo Nacional Centro de Arte Reina Sofía, Madrid), dating from 1939, in which Ferrant returns to figurative art with a budget unconnected to the academic field.

In 1943 he was commissioned by the architects Durán de Cottes and López Izquierdo in collaborating in a set of sculptures designed for the façade of the Teatro Albéniz in Madrid, as a reinterpretation of the façades of the Spanish Baroque architecture. His task was to sculpt eleven wooden statues, which by a simple crankshaft mechanism and a small motor would move their jointed parts (they would appear playing guitar, fanning themselves, moving their torso, etc.). The statues could be seen in the façade until 1983. That year they were exhibited and, from then onwards, they were kept in the theatre's foyer. For economic reasons, Ferrant took different orders, such as some of the reliefs of the Descubrimiento column in La Rábida (Huelva), but he also started working again in objetos hallados - shells, stones, sticks - assembled in structures of “non-utilitarian expression”.

In 1948 he met the German artist Mathias Goeritz and his Escuela de Altamira, which promoted working with stone or clay objects in which human figures would be outlined. Ferrant and Goeritz published Figuras del mar, a book with texts in German and drawings made by Ferrant. In 1949, he exhibited his móviles, similar to Calder and his sculpture Estáticas. In 1960, Ferrant won the special sculpture award in the XXX Bienal of Valencia.

== Notes ==
- Alix, Josefina (1985). Escultura Española 1900/1936. Madrid, Ed. El Viso. ISBN 8489455538.
- Álvarez Lopera, José, "Ángel Ferrant en la Guerra Civil", Anales de Historia del Arte, vol. extraordinario (2008), pp. 335–355
- Arte protegido: memoria de la Junta del Tesoro Artístico durante la Guerra Civil, [exposición], catálogo coord. Isabel Argerich Fernández y Judith Ara Lázaro, 2009, ISBN 8481813877
