= Alejandro Ferrant y Fischermans =

Spanish painter

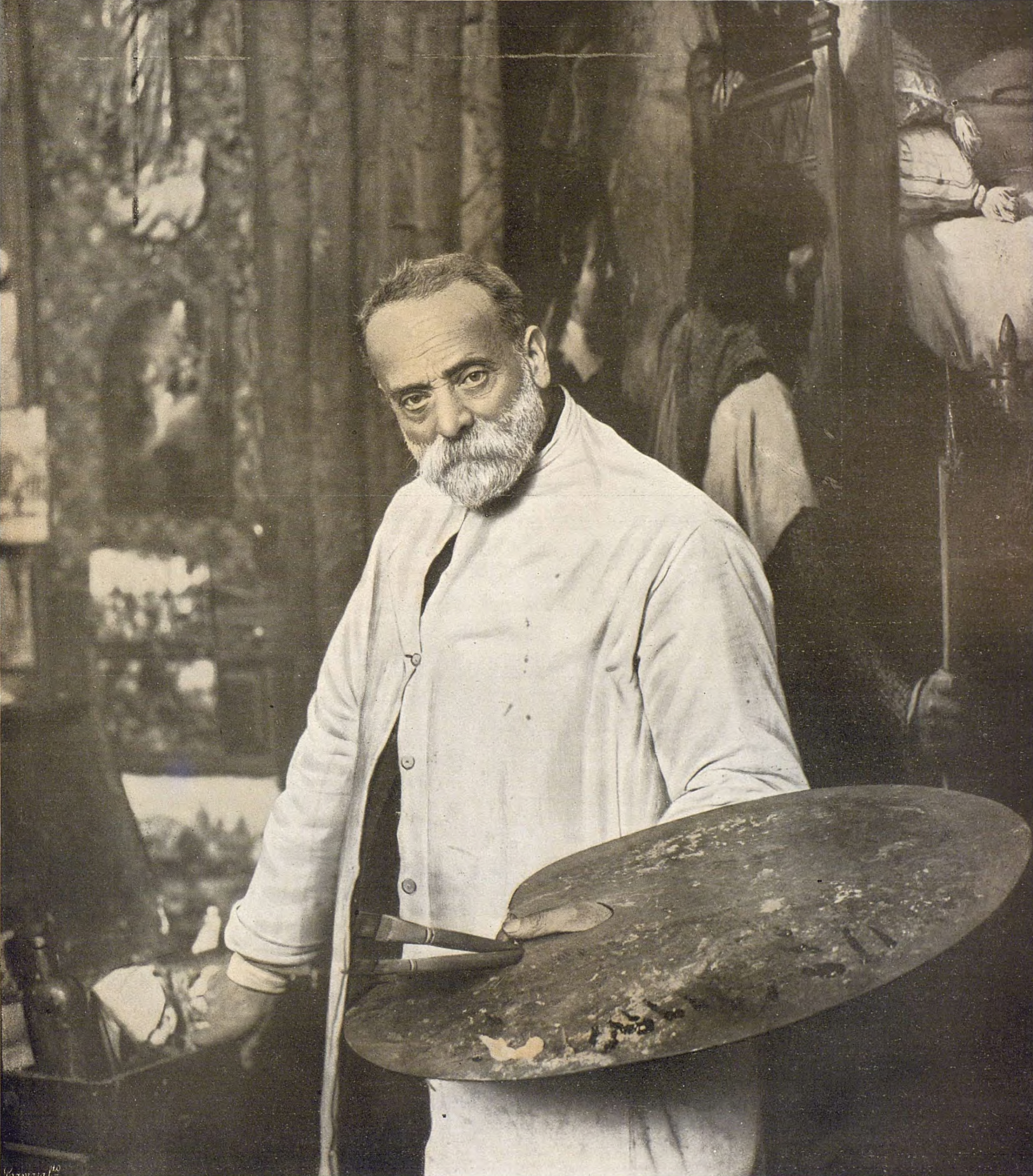
Alejandro Ferrant

Alejandro Ferrant y Fischermans (9 September 1843 – 20 January 1917) was a Spanish painter.

== Life ==
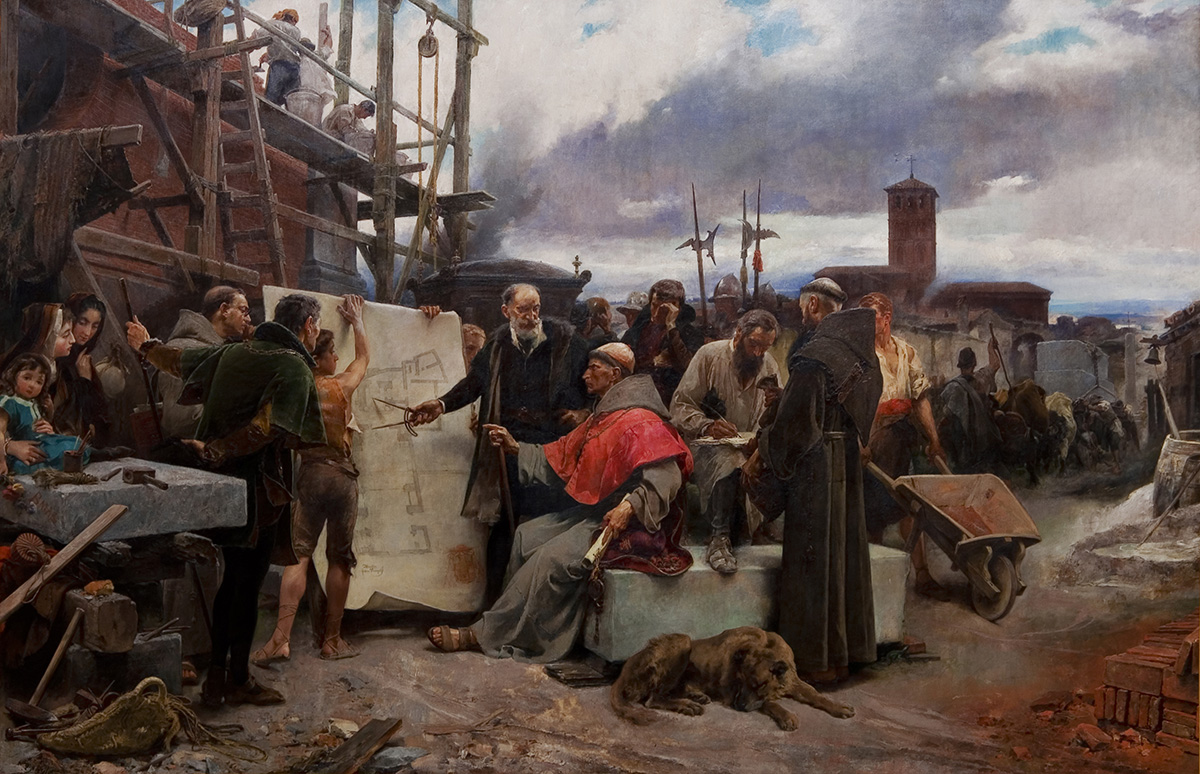
Cisneros (sitting) visits the construction of the Hospital of the Charity. Sanctuary of the Charity of Illescas (Toledo)

He was born in Madrid, and studied with his uncle, Luis Ferrant Llausàs, and at the Real Academia de Bellas Artes de San Fernando. He also received a fellowship to study in Rome, where he was among the first students to attend the "Academia Española de Bellas Artes en Roma", together with Francisco Pradilla, Casto Plasencia, Manuel Castellano, Eduardo Sánchez Solá and Jaime Morera.

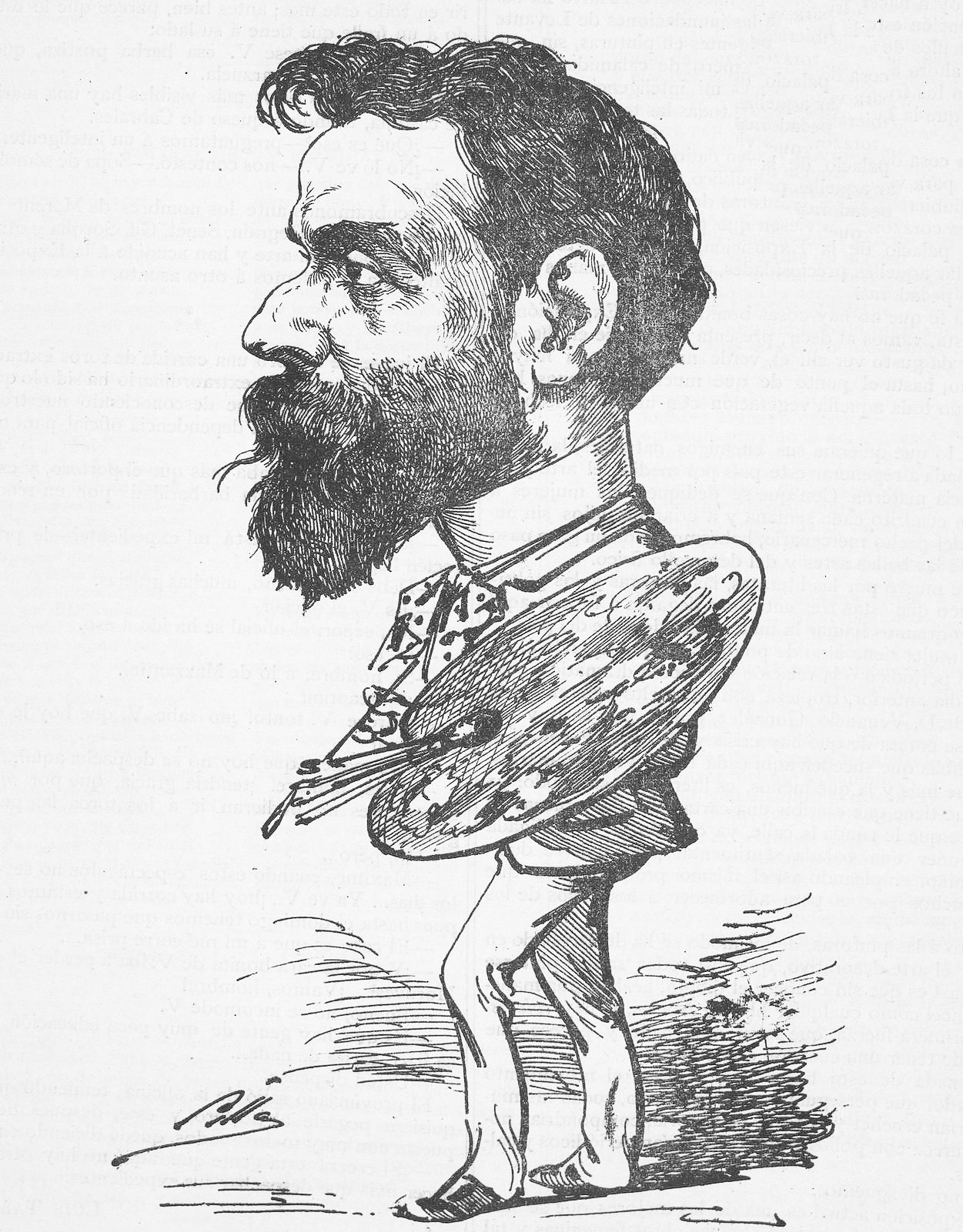
Caricature of Alejandro Ferrant

He was director of the Museum of Modern Art in Madrid, which was merged into the Museo del Prado in 1971. His son Ángel Ferrant was a leading sculptor of the Spanish vanguard.

== Selected works ==
He mainly painted religious and historical themes, but also devoted to genre painting and decorative art:

- The Last Communion of San Fernando.
- Sibyls and prophets on the inside of the dome of San Francisco el Grande, Madrid.
- The Burial of Saint Sebastian.
- Cisneros, founder of Illescas hospital - won the first medal of the National Exhibition of Fine Arts of 1892.

== Sources ==
- (in Spanish) Diccionario de Arte, Pintores del siglo XIX, Editorial LIBSA, 2001. ISBN 84-7630-842-6
