= Centre William Rappard =

Headquarter of WTO in Geneva, Switzerland

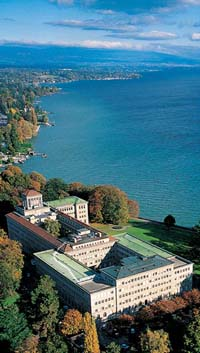
- Interactive map of the Centre William Rappard area

General information
- Architectural style: Classicism
- Location: Geneva, Switzerland
- Coordinates: 46°13′27″N 06°08′58″E
- Construction started: 1923
- Completed: 1926

Design and construction
- Architect: George Épitaux

The Centre William Rappard at Rue de Lausanne 154, Geneva, Switzerland, was built between 1923 and 1926 to house the International Labour Office (ILO). It was the first building in Geneva designed to house an international organization. In 1975 the ILO moved to Grand Saconnex and in 1977 the Centre William Rappard was occupied by the secretariat of the General Agreement on Tariffs and Trade (GATT), the UN High Commissioner for Refugees, and the library of the Graduate Institute of International and Development Studies. By 1995, the World Trade Organization (WTO) replaced the GATT and became the main occupant of the Centre William Rappard. In 2008–2013, the building was completely renovated and an extension was constructed to make available more office space and meeting rooms.

== History ==
The site of the Centre William Rappard was part of two estates formed from the Rappard and Bloch properties, and contained two mansions. The Villa Rappard was originally built in 1785 and renovated in 1894. The Villa Bloch was demolished in 1957 to make way for the south wing expansion of the Centre William Rappard. The Villa Rappard and land, situated to the north of the original site, were acquired by the ILO in 1963. The Swiss Confederation acquired the Bloch property in 1921 and donated it to the League of Nations in 1923. Later that year, the Swiss architect George Épitaux (1873–1957) was commissioned to build the new ILO headquarters. The construction lasted three years, and the new building was inaugurated on 6 June 1926. Wings were added to the north-east (1937), south-west (1938), south (1951), and south-east (1957). In 1975 the ILO moved to neighbouring Grand Saconnex and the property was owned by the Building Foundation for International Organizations (FIPOI), of the Swiss Confederation and the Canton of Geneva. In 1977, the building was renovated and named Centre William Rappard after the Swiss diplomat William Rappard (1883–1958). That year, it was occupied by the secretariat of the GATT, the UNHCR, and the Graduate Institute's library.

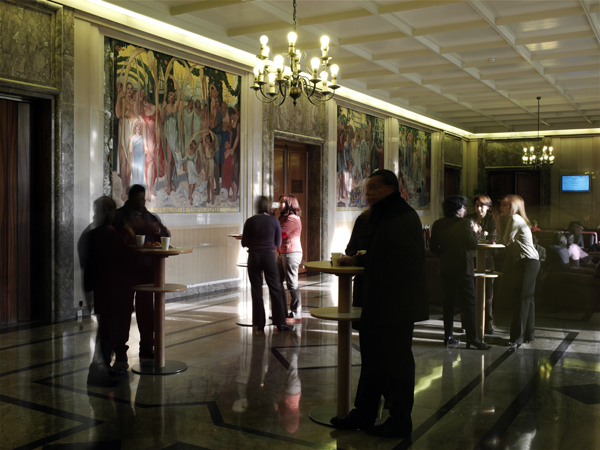
Salle des Pas-Perdus

In 1995, the Centre became the headquarters of the World Trade Organization (WTO), that is the current tenant of the building. In 1998 a conference centre was built next to Rue de Lausanne, by the Swiss architect Ugo Brunoni. In 2007, following research conducted at the ILO archives and WTO locations, various hidden artworks were rediscovered and exposed to visitors. After the creation of the WTO, the organization lacked space for staff and delegates for their daily meetings. After considering several options, the Swiss authorities and the WTO have reached an agreement in early August 2008 to renovate, extend and improve the Centre William Rappard. This was the best solution in terms of cost and efficiency. In 2008 the renovation and extension of the building was approved by the Swiss Confederation. Works started in 2009, and added an extension providing 300 new work posts (out of total 1,200 potential places in the whole building) and an underground car park with 200 places). Furthermore, the original building was fully renovated to add more working space for staff members, delegates and visitors. Works were performed in three phases: 2008–2011, renovation of the General Council Room, modernization of infrastructure (electricity, plumbing, heating), and creation of new rooms. 2010–2012, densifying and increasing the indoor capacity, including the Atrium in the former north courtyard and large meeting rooms in the south courtyard. 2011-2013: construction of the new building between the former south parking and the park.

== Description ==
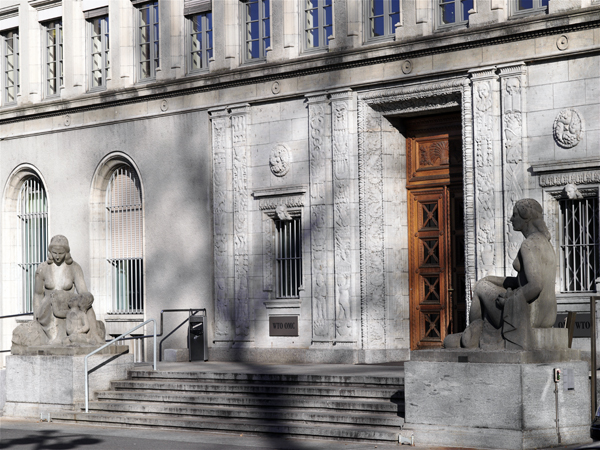
Main entrance

The original building by Lausanne-born George Épitaux was based on a classical Florentine villa, with an interior courtyard, grand entrance and a sweeping staircase leading up from the main entrance hall. The size of the first construction was 86.30 x 33.80 metres, with the top of the central cupola at 32 metres from the floor level. Entirely built in cement, some areas also include granite from Ticino and sandstone from Würenlos (Aargau). Épitaux hired renowned sculptors and artisans, including Luc Jaggi (1887–1976), Maurice Sarki (Sarkissoff) (1882–1946), León Perrin (1886–1978), and others. Immediately after the World War II George Épitaux was commissioned again to build two extensions to the north and south of the original building. Geometric shapes and symbolic decorations were used in the extensions to provide esthetic consistency.

The renovation and construction performed in 2008-2013 included two major projects, changes in the original structure and a new building. Among the changes and improvements included in the renovation are the transformation of the former north courtyard of the original building in an Atrium. This was developed by Group8 Architects of Geneva, who focused on modernization, space optimization, respect for the past, and transformation with respect for the environment.

The new building in the south of the Centre William Rappard, by Jen Wittfoht of Stuttgart, Germany, achieves discretion, dialogue between modern and classic, efficiency, low energy standards and integration to the space (street, park and lake). The WTO is located in a natural setting and its building extension is part of a sustainable development approach. The first priority has been given to preserve biodiversity and natural areas. This is why the WTO has followed the Minergie P standard and has chosen non-polluting and recyclable materials for the new building as well as the renovation of CWR. Materials have been selected on the basis of a life cycle assessment, considering all the energy required for their production, manufacture, use and recycling. The extension is one element of the border lake landscape. Its glass structure reflects the natural surroundings in a way that the building integrates to the landscape. One of the objectives of the WTO has been to construct a building requiring very low energy consumption. Energy savings are fully effective owing to the installation of solar panels that reap enough energy to heat the water used by the WTO. A protective film installed on the windows also helps to create better insulation, repeals ultraviolet radiations and reduces energy costs. Lake Geneva has become the natural air conditioning of the building ("Genève-Lac-Nations" network). Heating and cooling systems are supplied by the deep waters of the lake, which are transported and distributed according to a hydrothermal network. Heat pumps are also used. This system has been developed by "Services Industriels de Genève". All other energy sources available on the site (sun, wind, vegetation, soil characteristics) are used as well. The exceptional brightness of the lake borders is also an asset and the building has been designed so that the daylight illuminates the offices as long as possible.

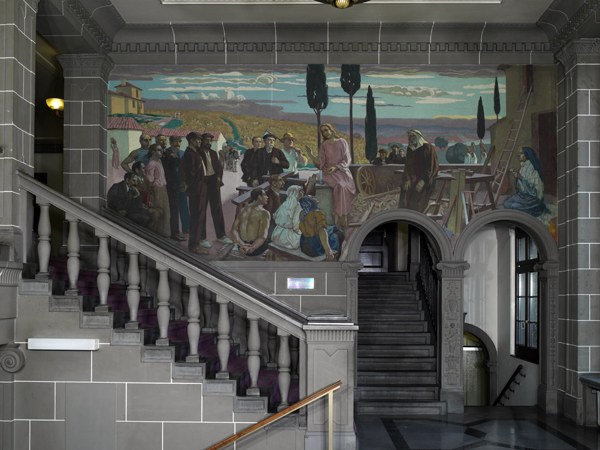
La Dignité du Travail, by Maurice Denis, 1931

The Centre William Rappard houses a collection of artworks, most of them donated during ILO times by governments and institutions. Some of these artworks are Maurice Denis’s The Dignity of Labour (1931), Seán Keating’s Irish Industrial Development (1961), Jorge Colaço’s Grape-harvesting, Ploughing the soil and Fishing tiled panels (1928), Luc Jaggi’s Peace and Justice statues (1925), Albert Hahn Jr.’s Delft panel (1926), Gustave-Louis Jaulmes’s Universal Joy, Work in Abundance and The Benefits of Leisure murals (1940), Dean Cornwell’s murals on labour (1955), Eduardo Chicharro y Agüera’s Pygmalion (1925), and Gilbert Bayes’s Child with Fish (or Blue Robed Bambino) fountain (1926). Among the recent donations and acquisitions are Jean-Claude Prêtre's Danaé World Suite / 11 September 2001, and Catherine Bolle's Outre Terre. Under the trees in the street-side of the Centre William Rappard, a Chinese Garden has been donated in 2013 by the Ministry of Commerce of China and the Municipal Government of Suzhou to celebrate the tenth anniversary of China's accession to the WTO.

There have been various occurrences of art suppression in the Centre William Rappard. The Geneva Window (1930) by Harry Clarke, which was commissioned by the Irish government as a gift to the ILO, was never sent to Geneva. Eduardo Chicharro y Agüera's Pygmalion was covered in 1936 and remained hidden during 70 years. Other artworks have been removed, covered or destroyed, such as Albert Hahn Jr.'s Building the Future, Gustave Louis Jaulmes's The Triumphant Peace murals, and Dean Cornwell murals on labour (the three works removed by the GATT Secretariat in 1975). Many of them were recovered, restored and placed in their original locations during the renovation of the building in 2008-2013. In 2019, the caricature painting In GATT We Trust by Claude Namy was removed from public exhibition.

== Criticism ==
=== Geneva Referendum for a New Building ===
Following the approval by the Swiss federal authorities, on 6 April 2009 the city of Geneva approved the expansion of the Centre William Rappard. The work included major changes in the internal courtyards, and a new wing on what was the south parking. Following Swiss standards for the protection of international organizations and foreign officers, security installations were built, including a perimeter around the building. Budget was 150 million Swiss Francs, including 70 million by the Swiss Confederation and 60 million as a loan by FIPOI. The City Council approved the expansion with 50 votes in favour and 17 against it, the latter including "A gauche toute!" and UDC parties. Christian Zaugg and Pierre Vanek of "A gauche toute!" advanced that a referendum would be held to oppose the construction. Against the advice of the majority of Geneva political leaders, including the responsible for municipal and cantonal constructions Mark Muller of the Liberal Party, and Sandrine Salerno of the Socialist Party, the organisers of the referendum obtained 6,919 signatures supporting their project (versus a minimum of 4,000). However, after verification only 4,022 signatures were validated. The referendum took place on 27 September 2009, with 61.8 per cent of voters supporting the expansion of the Centre William Rappard (turnout 39.5 per cent) "By accepting this project, Genevans showed their commitment to the international city and to multiculturalism" declared Sandrine Salerno. Director-General Pascal Lamy said that the results of the referendum "will encourage us to extend our outreach to you even further”.

=== Removal of Claude Namy's Painting ===
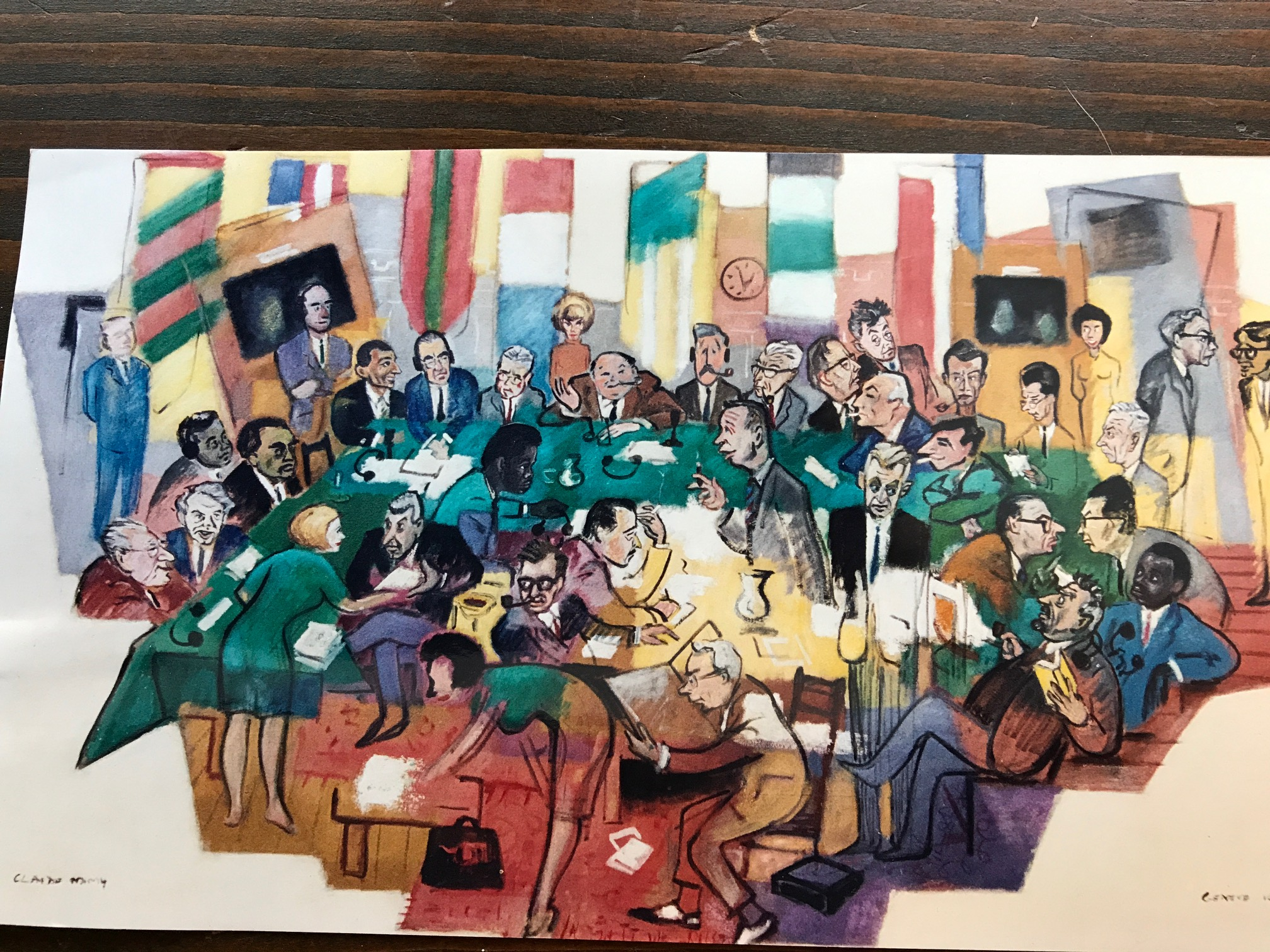
In GATT We Trust (1966) by Claude Namy

In October 2019, after a heated debate and strong resistance by many WTO staff members and delegates, the caricature painting In GATT We Trust by the interpreter and artist Claude Namy was removed from the entrance hall and sent to an underground deposit. The painting (1.10 m high, 1.85 m wide, acrylic on canvas) dates from 1966. It is a humorous depiction of a meeting at the GATT Secretariat in Geneva during the Kennedy Round period (1964-1967). Director-General Eric Wyndham White is seen at the head of a u-shaped table addressing the audience. Around the table are GATT Secretariat officers and delegates from member countries (the "contracting parties"), all of them sitting at the table, as well as interpreters, assistants, secretaries and ushers. The four women are standing and supporting the work of the male ambassadors and officers. In the foreground, the chief interpreter holds a folder and casts a surreptitious glance at the buttocks of one of the female assistants. The humorous intention is condensed in the legend inscribed on the bottom of the illustration, “In GATT We Trust”, which is a witty paraphrase of “In God We Trust”, the official motto of the United States of America and the Republic of Nicaragua. Furthermore, the artist reproduced the motto in a way that the capital “T” of Trust is placed at a lower level than the text, leaving the title to be read as “In GATT We Rust”. This painting "was on display for 30 years in what is now Room Y, in the small cafeteria. It was removed in 2007 to uncover Eduardo Chicharro’s Pygmalion, and was then placed at the service entrance and, after the renovation, in the Delegates Room. In 2013, it was finally hung in Room B" By June 2019, within the context of the MeToo movement, negative perceptions arose among staff members. The painting was removed from Room B and later placed in the access of the main entrance hall to the lakeside terrace. After several internal discussions that were dominated by the gender debate, the Director-General Roberto Azevêdo decided that the painting should be removed, which was done on 2 October 2019. This occurrence of art censorship was later followed by Keith Rockwell of the WTO information and media relations division when he asked to delete what he considered sensitive information from the manuscript of a book chapter dedicated to the removal of In GATT We Trust.

== Photo gallery ==
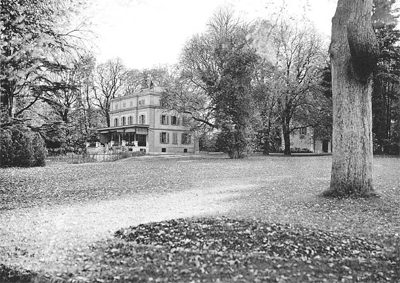
Villa Bloch (formerly Rochefoucault)

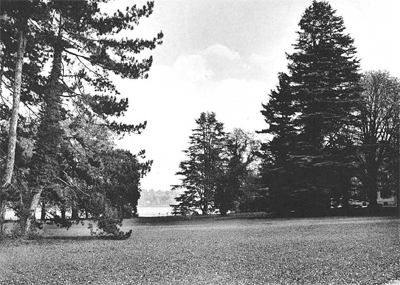
Villa Bloch park and Lake Léman, ca. 1923

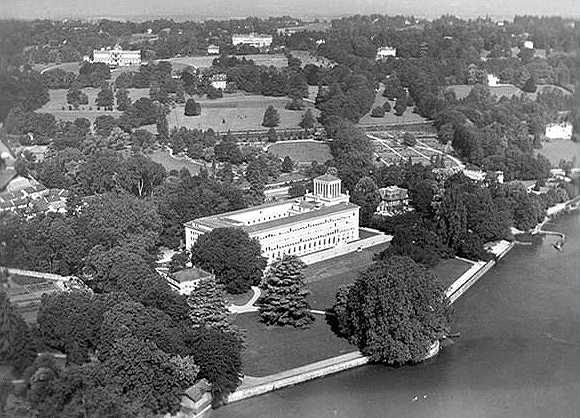
Aerial view, 1926

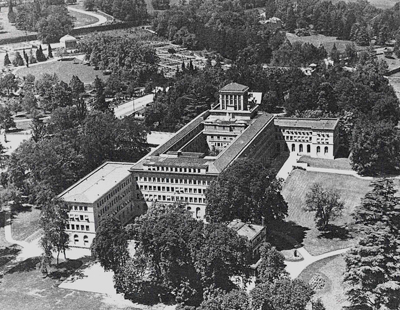
Aerial view, 1938

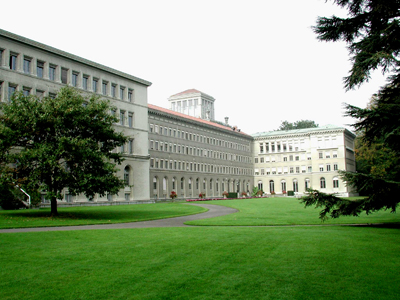
Lake façade and park of former ILO

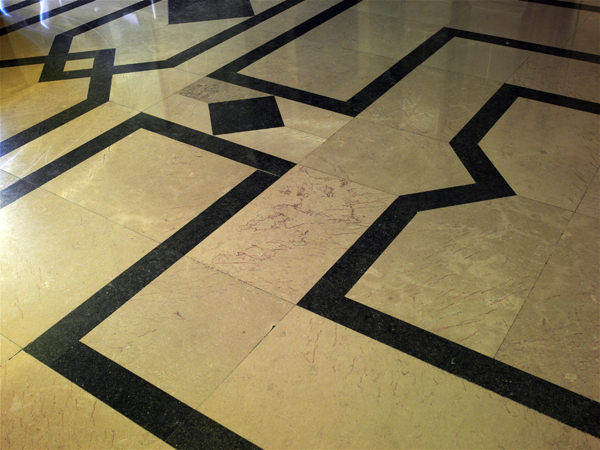
Entrance hall floor

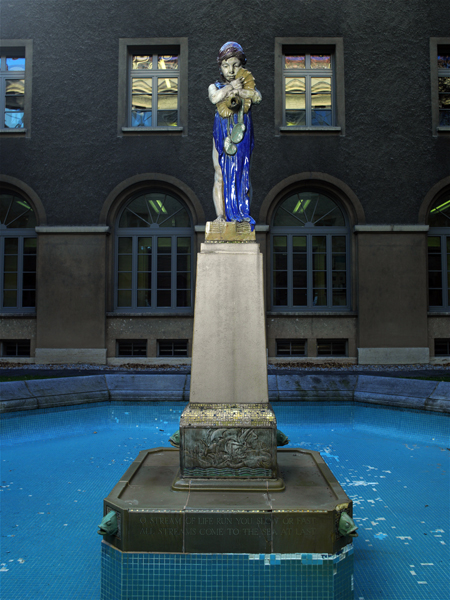
Courtyard, ornamental fountain

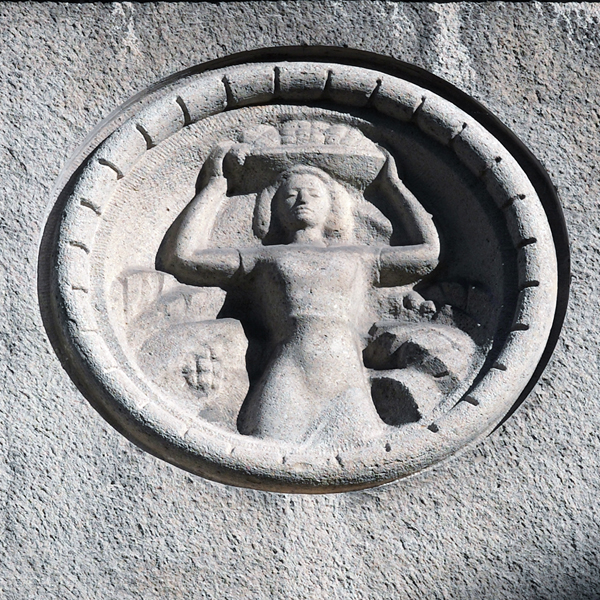
Façade decorations

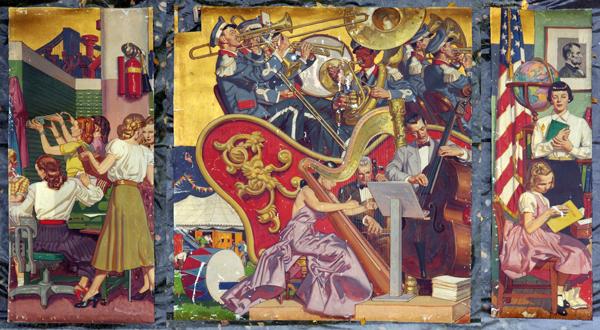
Murals by Dean Cornwell, 1955

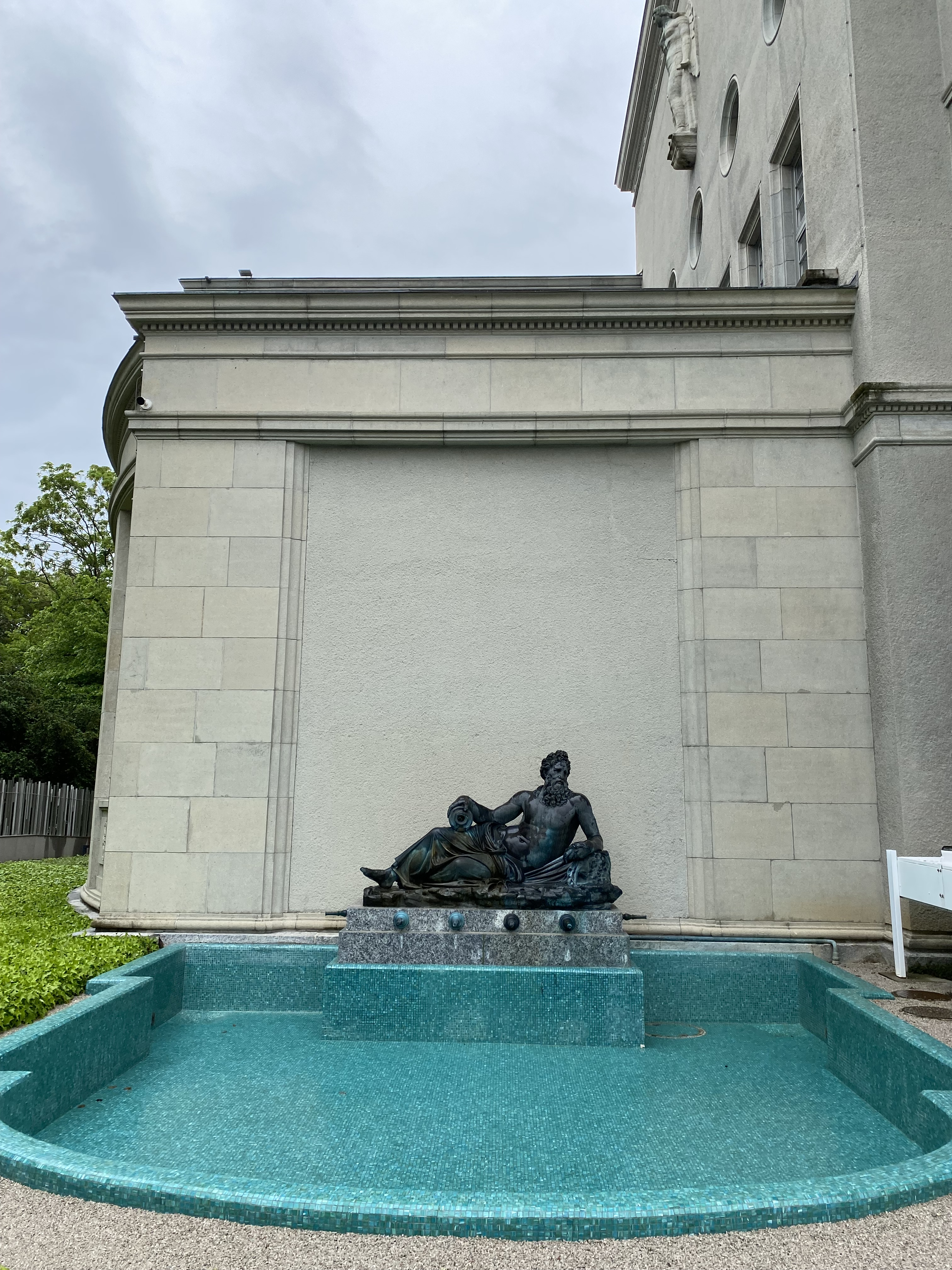
Statue of the Tiber by Pietro Canonica, donated by the Italian government in 1926

== See also ==
- World Trade Organization
- General Agreement on Tariffs and Trade
- International Labour Organization
- United Nations Office at Geneva
