= Alejandro Ferrant Vázquez =

Spanish architect

Alejandro Ferrant Vázquez (Madrid, 1897–1976) was a Spanish architect.

Ferrant worked as a monument restorer starting in 1929, within the services provided by the Second Spanish Republic. He was in Asturias, León, Galicia, Cantabria and Zamora, working in the restoration of the Oviedo and Santiago de Compostela cathedrals, also in the colegiata (collegiate church) of Santillana del Mar and the colegiata of Toro. Later his works of restoration were overall in the east part: Catalonia, Valencia and Balearic Islands, namely in the cathedrals of Palma, Lleida, Tarragona and Valencia and also in the monasteries of Ripoll, Santes Creus and Poblet.

During his professional life, he managed to create a large archive of photographs and reports which were donated to the Biblioteca Valenciana. In the College of Architects of Lleida there are more than 24,285 photographs taken between 1932 and 1976.
