= Teatro Albéniz =

Coordinates: 40°24′55″N 3°42′15″W

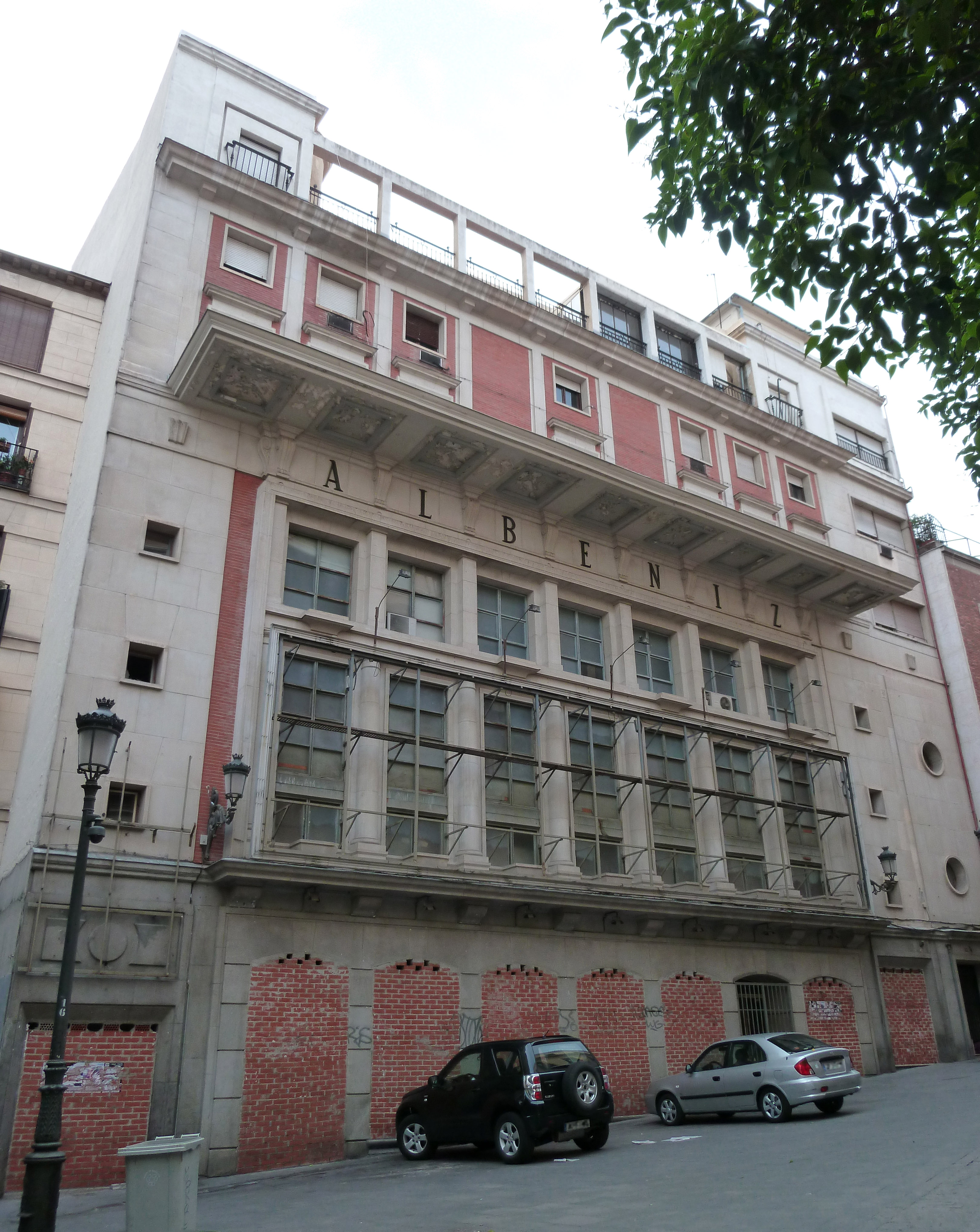
Teatro Albéniz

Teatro Albéniz is a theatre in Madrid, Spain. Located in the Centro district at No. 11 Calle de la Paz, it opened in the 1940s. It initially featured opera and ballet, and later also zarzuela. It had a seating capacity of 1,000 seats in 1945. After various legal problems, Teatro Albéniz closed in 2009 but after a long legal battle led by lawyers Beltrán Gambier and Eva Aladro from “Plataforma Salvar el Teatro Albéniz” (Save Albéniz Theatre Platform), the 17 of November 2022 it reopened its doors after a careful renovation as part of the UMusic Hotel Madrid complex, with the premiere of the musical production “Company”, of Stephen Sondheim and directed by Antonio Banderas.
