= Cañizar =

Cañizar, Spain
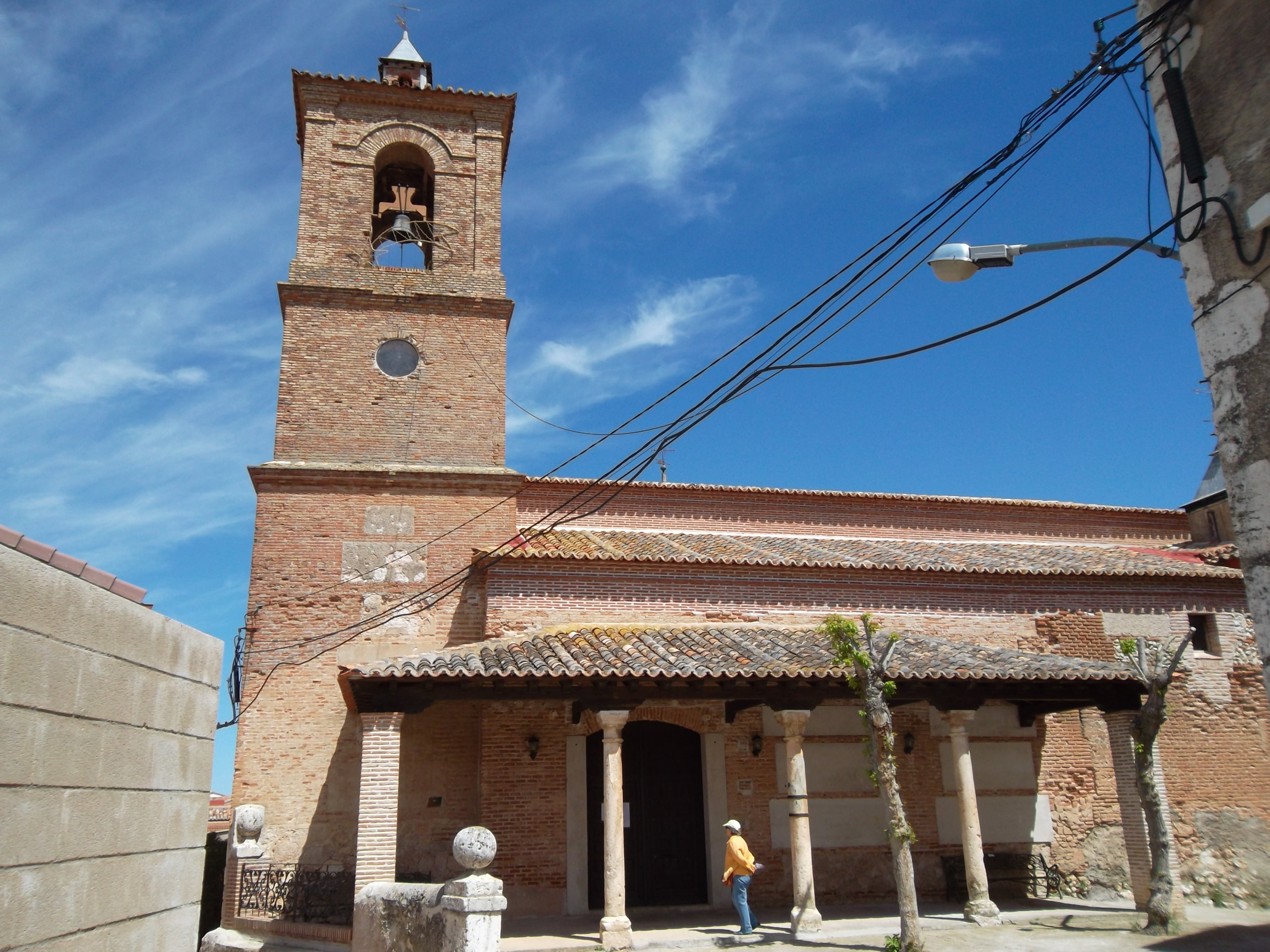

- Coat of arms

- Location within Province of Guadalajara Location within Castilla-La Mancha Location within Spain
- Coordinates: 40°46′15″N 3°03′56″W
- Country: Spain
- Autonomous community: Castilla–La Mancha
- Province: Guadalajara
- Municipality: Cañizar

Area
  - Total: 15.41 km^{2} (5.95 sq mi)

Population (2025-01-01)
  - Total: 78
  - Density: 5.1/km^{2} (13/sq mi)
- Time zone: UTC+1 (CET)
  - Summer (DST): UTC+2 (CEST)

Cañizar is a municipality located in the province of Guadalajara, Castile-La Mancha, Spain. According to the 2011 census (INE), the municipality has a population of 84 inhabitants.
