= Casto Plasencia =

Spanish painter (1846–1890)

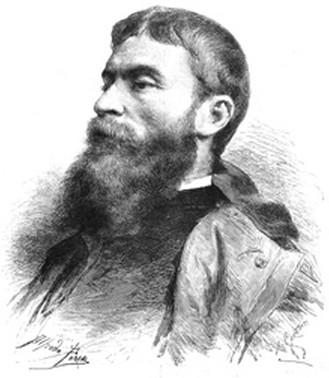
- Engraving by Alfredo Perea, 1886
- Born: Casto Plasencia y Maestro'; 17 July 1846; Cañizar, Spain
- Died: 18 May 1890 (aged 43); Madrid, Spain
- Education: Real Academia de Bellas Artes de San Fernando, Madrid; Academia Española de Bellas Artes, Rome

Casto Plasencia y Maestro (17 July 1846 – 18 May 1890) was a Spanish painter of landscapes, portraits and murals.

== Biography ==
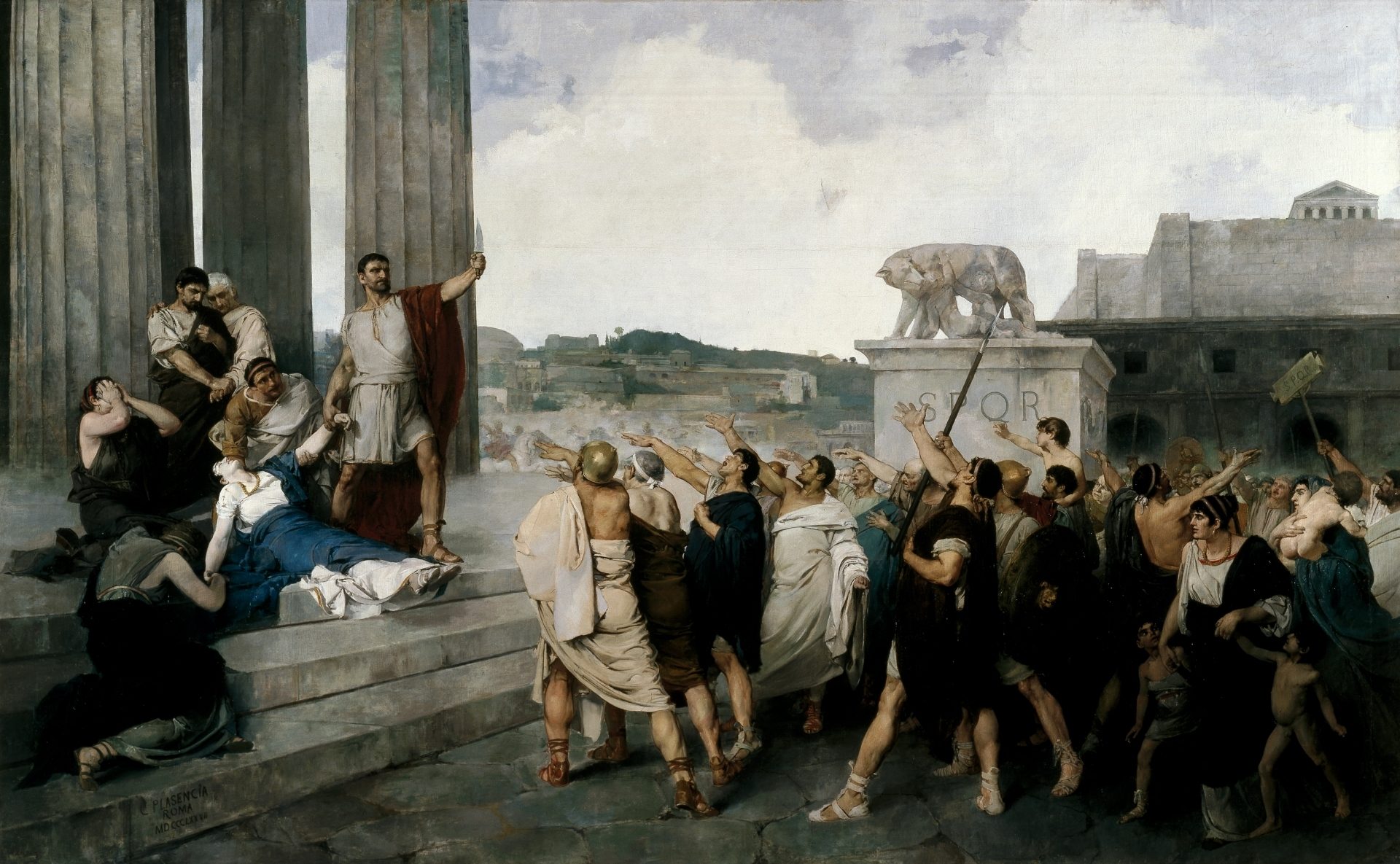
Origin of the Roman Republic (1877)

Plasencia was born in Cañizar. His father was a rural doctor, and he was orphaned as a teenager. Under the sponsorship of several local nobles, he travelled to Madrid and entered the Real Academia de Bellas Artes de San Fernando, where he became one of the first students who received fellowships to the new "Academia Española de Bellas Artes de Roma". His initial success came in 1878 with his "Origin of the Roman Republic", which won First Prize at the Exposición Nacional de Bellas Artes and Third Prize at the Exposition Universelle in Paris.

After becoming established in Madrid, he was chosen to do portraits of King Alfonso XII and Queen María. He also stood out as a painter of religious subjects. As the Assistant Manager on a project at the San Francisco el Grande Basilica, he participated in decorating the main cupola and was in charge of the paintings for the chapel of the Order of Carlos III. He was also involved in decorating the Palacio del Marqués de Linares and was one of the founding members of the Círculo de Bellas Artes.

In the summer of 1884, his fellow painter Tomás García Sampedro invited him to visit Muros del Nalón in Asturias. He was charmed by the area and continued to visit there every summer with other painters and students who formed what came to be known as the "Colonia artística de Muros", a group devoted to plein-air painting in the surrounding countryside. Plasencia died suddenly in Madrid, aged only forty-three.
