= List of theatres and concert halls in Spain =

A list of theatres and concert halls in Spain:

== Andalusia ==
- Teatro Andalucía
- Teatro Apolo (Almería)
- Black Box Teatro
- Teatro romano de Cádiz
- Teatro Calderón (Motril)
- Teatro-Cine Cardenio
- Teatro Central de Sevilla
- Teatro Cerezo
- Teatro Ciudad de Marbella
- Sala Compañía
- Teatro El jardinito
- Teatro Florida
- Foro Iberoamericano de La Rábida
- Gran Teatro (Huelva)
- Gran Teatro Falla
- Teatro de Las Lagunas
- Teatro Lope de Vega (Sevilla)
- Teatro de la Maestranza
- Teatro Municipal Pedro Muñoz Seca
- Real Teatro de las Cortes
- Teatro Sanjuan Écija
- Teatro Coliseo España
- Teatro Principal (Puerto Real)
- Teatro romano de Itálica
- Teatro-cine Torcal
- Teatro Vicente Espinel
- Teatro Villamarta

=== Córdoba ===
- Teatro de la Axerquía
- Teatro Cómico (Córdoba)
- Teatro Duque de Rivas
- Teatro Góngora
- Gran Teatro de Córdoba
- Teatro romano de Córdoba

=== Jaén ===
- Teatro Cervantes (Jaén)
- Teatro Cervantes (Linares)
- Teatro Darymelia
- Teatro Infanta Leonor (Jaén)
- Teatro Maestro Álvarez Alonso

=== Málaga ===
- Teatro Alameda
- Auditorio Municipal de Málaga
- Teatro Cánovas
- Centro de Arte y Creación Joven
- Teatro Cervantes (Málaga)
- Teatro Echegaray
- Auditorio Edgar Neville
- Auditorio Eduardo Ocón
- Escuela Superior de Arte Dramático de Málaga
- Sala María Cristina
- Teatro Romano de Málaga

== Aragón ==
- Teatro de la Estación
- Teatro del Mercado
- Teatro Principal (Zaragoza)

== Asturias ==
- Teatro Campoamor
- Teatro Filarmónica
- Teatro del Fontán
- Teatro Jovellanos
- Nuevo Teatro de La Felguera
- Teatro Armando Palacio Valdés
- Teatro Virginia

== Basque Country ==
- Teatro Arriaga
- Teatro Campos Elíseos
- Teatro Coliseo (Éibar)
- Palacio Euskalduna
- Sala Kontainer Aretoa
- Palacio de Congresos y Auditorio Kursaal
- Teatro Victoria Eugenia

== Canary Islands ==
- Auditorio Alfredo Kraus (Gran Canaria)
- Auditorio de Tenerife
- Teatro Cairasco
- Teatro Chico (Santa Cruz de La Palma)
- Teatro Guimerá
- Teatro Leal
- Teatro Pérez Galdós
- Teatro Guiniguada

== Cantabria ==
- Centro de Acción Social y Cultural de Caja Cantabria
- Palacio de Festivales de Cantabria
- Teatro Pereda
- Teatro Casino Liceo
- Teatro Concha Espina
- Teatro Principal (Reinosa)

== Castilla La Mancha ==
- Teatro Auditorio Buero Vallejo
- Teatro Rojas
- Teatro Circo de Albacete
- Teatro Lope de Vega (Ocaña)
- Teatro Victoria (Talavera de la Reina)

== Castilla y León ==
- Gran Teatro Reina Sofía
- Teatro Apolo (Miranda de Ebro)
- Teatro Calderón (Valladolid)
- Teatro Emperador
- Teatro Gullón (Astorga)
- Teatro Bergidum
- Teatro Principal (Burgos)
- Teatro Juan Bravo
- Teatro Latorre
- Teatro Lope de Vega (Valladolid)
- Teatro Pradera
- Teatro Principal de Zamora
- Teatro Ramos Carrión
- Teatro Trianón
- Teatro Zorrilla (Valladolid)

== Catalonia ==
=== Barcelona ===
- L'Antic Teatre
- Auditori AXA
- Barcelona City Hall
- Barcelona Teatre Musical
- Biblioteca de Catalunya
- Brossa Espai Escènic
- Cafè-Teatre Llantiol
- Círcol Maldà
- Club Capitol
- Club Helena
- Coliseum
- Espai Navae
- El Liceu
- El Molino
- Fundació Joan Miró
- Guasch Teatre
- Jove Teatre Regina
- L'Auditori
- La Farinera del Clot
- La Puntual
- La Riereta Teatre
- Mercat de les Flors
  - Sala Aurèlia Capmany
  - Sala Ovidi Montllor
- Nau Ivanow
- Palau de la Música Catalana
- Palau Sant Jordi
- Porta 4
- Sala Atrium
- Sala Beckett
- Sala BeCool
- Sala El Off
- Sala Màgic
- Sala Muntaner
- Sala Raval
- Sala Razzmatazz
- Sant Andreu Teatre
- Sidecar Factory Club
- Tantarantana Teatre
- Teatre Apolo
- Teatre Aquitània
- Teatre Artèria Paral·lel
- Teatre Borràs
- Teatre CCCB (Centre de Cultura Contemporània de Barcelona)
- Teatre Centre de Gràcia
- Teatre Condal
- Teatre del Raval
- Teatre Gaudí de Barcelona
- Teatre Goya
- Teatre Grec
- Teatre Lliure
    - Sala Fabià Puigserver
    - Espai Lliure
- Teatre Nacional de Catalunya
- Teatre Novedades
- Teatre Poliorama
- Teatre Principal (Barcelona)
- Teatre Romea
- Teatre Tivoli
- Teatre Victòria
- Teatreneu
- Versus Teatre
- Villarroel Teatre
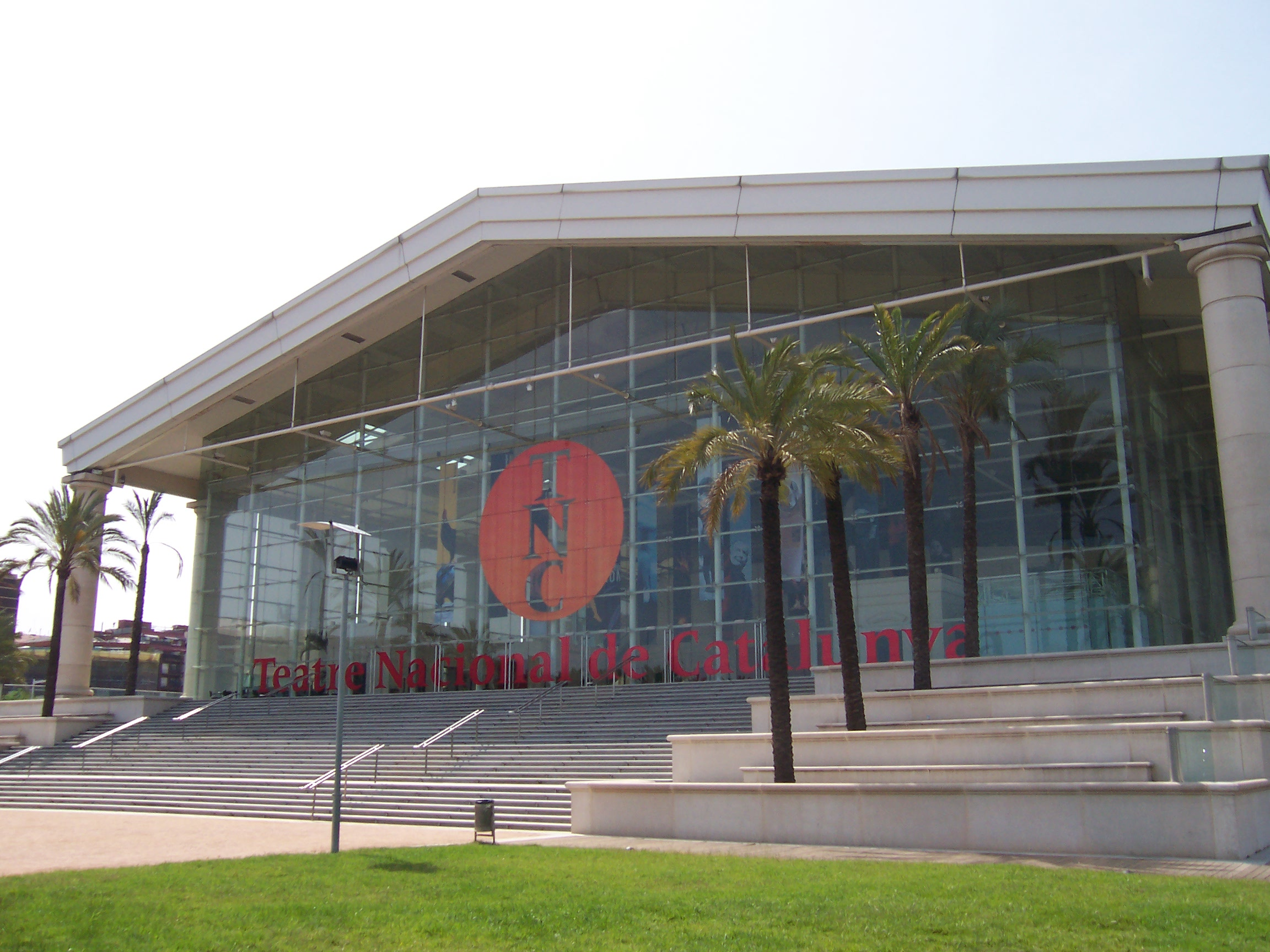
The postmodernist building of Teatre Nacional de Catalunya (TNC), designed by Ricardo Bofill

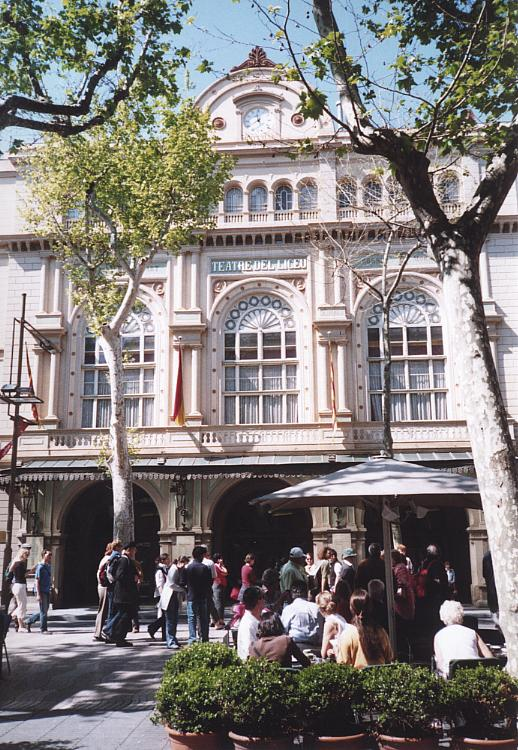
Gran Teatre del Liceu, the biggest opera house in Europe

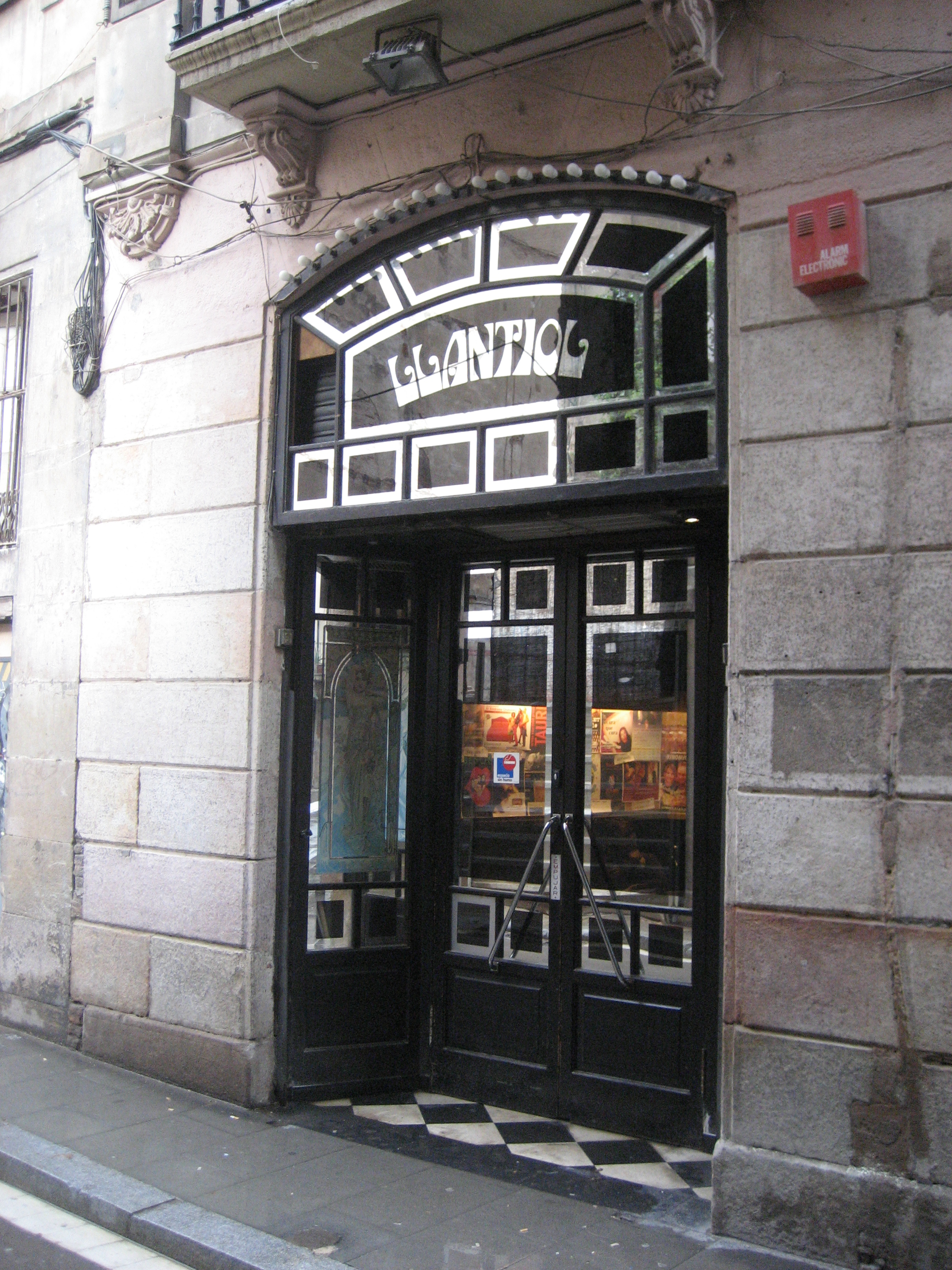
The small Cafè-Teatre Llantiol, with its modernista (Art Nouveau) design, in Barcelona's Raval

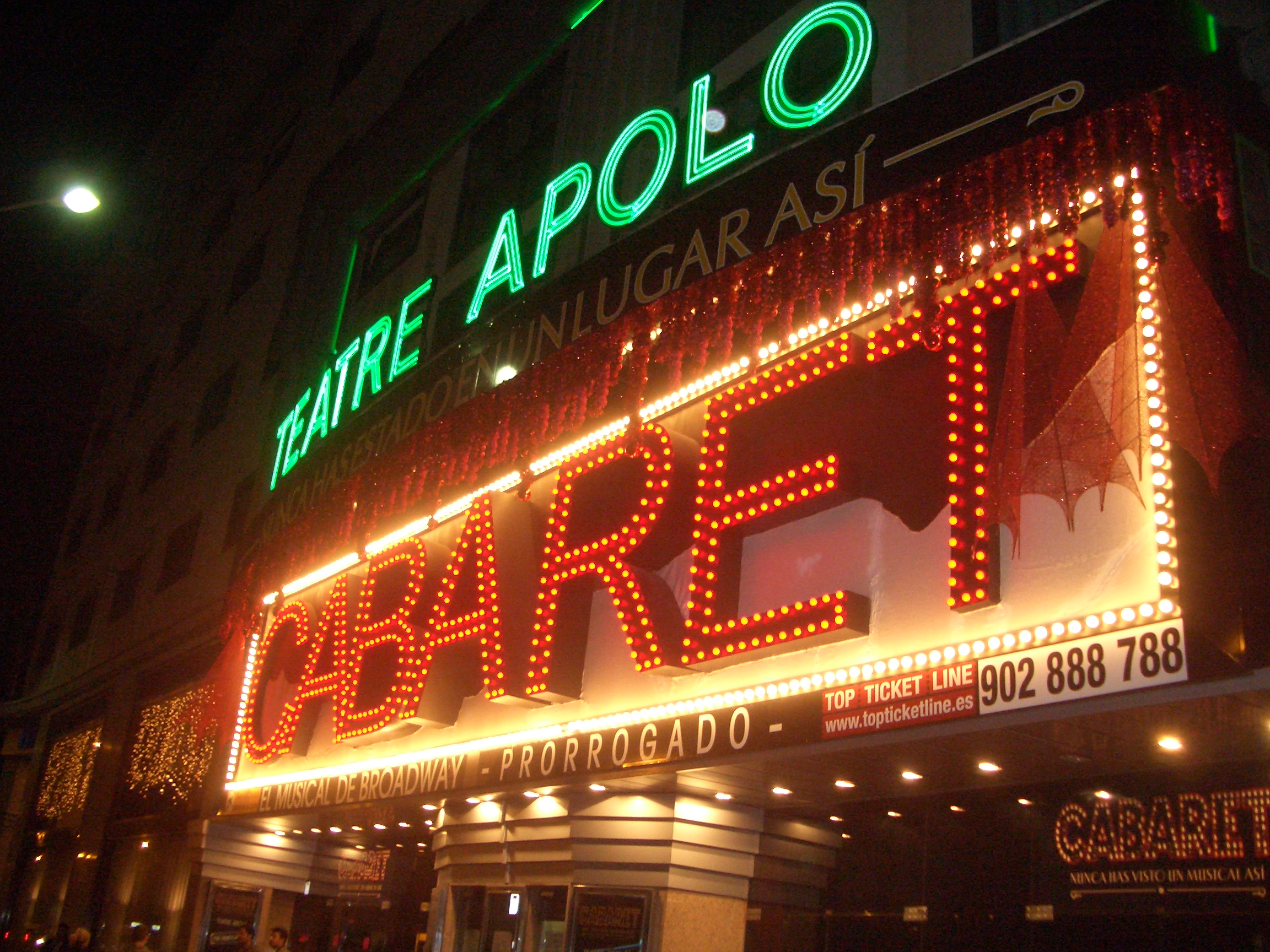
Teatre Apolo is a relic of the city's former cabaret district, Avinguda del Paral·lel

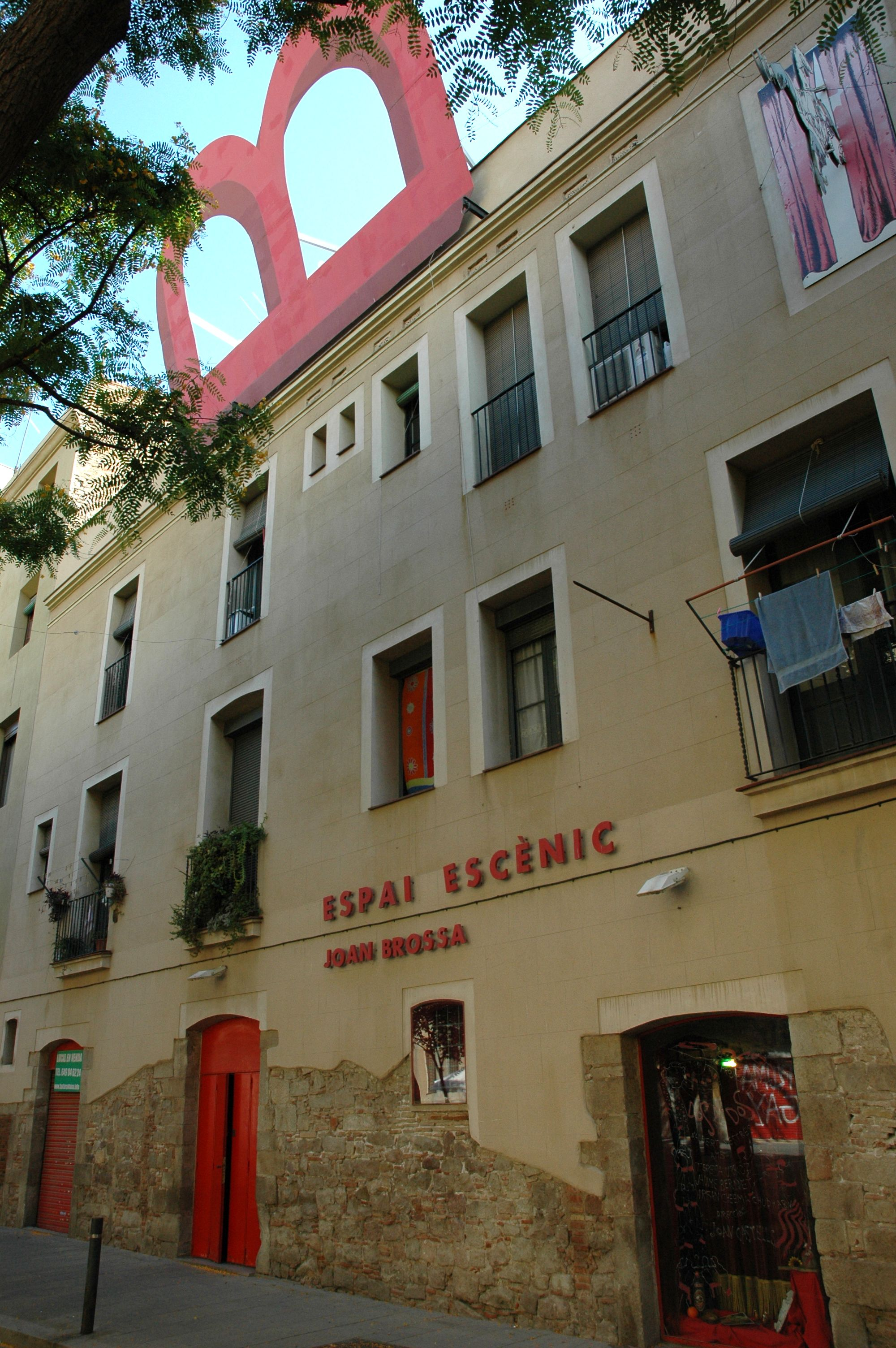
Brossa Espai Escènic, a small venue in El Born with more experimental plays, named after Joan Brossa

==== Defunct ====
- Artenbrut
- Teatre Arnau
- Teatre Belle Epoque
- Teatre Malic
- Teatro Mayor

==== Metropolitan area ====
- Atrium Viladecans, in Viladecans
- Auditori Barradas, in L'Hospitalet de Llobregat
- Auditori de Cornellà, in Cornellà de Llobregat
- Auditori Miquel Martí i Pol, in Sant Joan Despí
- Estraperlo (Club del Ritme), in Badalona
- Círcol Catòlic, in Badalona
- Foment Cultural i Artístic, in Sant Joan Despí
- Fundació La Roda, in Montcada i Reixac
- La Capsa, in El Prat de Llobregat
- Salamandra, in L'Hospitalet de Llobregat
- Teatre-Auditori Sant Cugat, in Sant Cugat del Vallès
- Teatre Blas Infante, in Badalona
- Teatre Joventut, in L'Hospitalet de Llobregat
- Teatre Mercè Rodoreda, in Sant Joan Despí
- Teatre Modern, in El Prat de Llobregat
- Teatre Núria Espert, in Sant Andreu de la Barca
- Teatre Principal, in Badalona
- Teatre Sagarra, in Santa Coloma de Gramenet
- Teatre Zorrilla, in Badalona

== Extremadura ==
- Teatro romano de Mérida

== Galicia ==
- Palacio de la Ópera (La Coruña)
- Teatro García Barbón

== Madrid ==
- Teatro de La Abadía
- Teatro Albéniz
- Teatro Alcázar
- Teatro Alfil
- Teatro Alhambra
- Teatro Apolo (Madrid)
- Teatro Arenal
- Teatro Arniches
- Teatro Bellas Artes
- Teatro del Buen Retiro
- Teatro Calderón (Madrid)
- Teatros del Canal
- Teatro de los Caños del Peral
- Teatro de Capellanes
- Teatro Chueca
- Teatro Circo
- Teatro Circo de Rivas
- Teatro Coliseum
- Teatro de la Comedia
- Corrales de comedias de Madrid
- Teatro de la Cruz
- Sala Cuarta Pared
- El Gayo Vallecano
- Teatro Eslava
- Teatro Español
- Teatro Felipe
- Teatro Fígaro
- Teatro Fuencarral
- Teatro Ideal
- Teatro Infanta Isabel
- Teatro Lara
- Teatro La Latina
- Teatro Lope de Vega (Madrid)
- Teatro de Madrid
- Teatro Maravillas
- Teatro María Guerrero
- Teatro Marquina
- Teatro Martín
- Monumental Cinema
- Teatro Muñoz Seca
- Teatro Novedades de Madrid
- Nuevo Teatro Alcalá
- Teatro Nuevo Apolo
- Teatro Pavón
- Teatro Pradillo
- Teatro del Príncipe
- Teatro Real
- Real Cinema
- Teatro Recoletos
- Teatro Reina Victoria
- Teatro Romea (Madrid)
- Teatro Valle-Inclán
- Teatro Variedades de Madrid
- Teatro de la Zarzuela
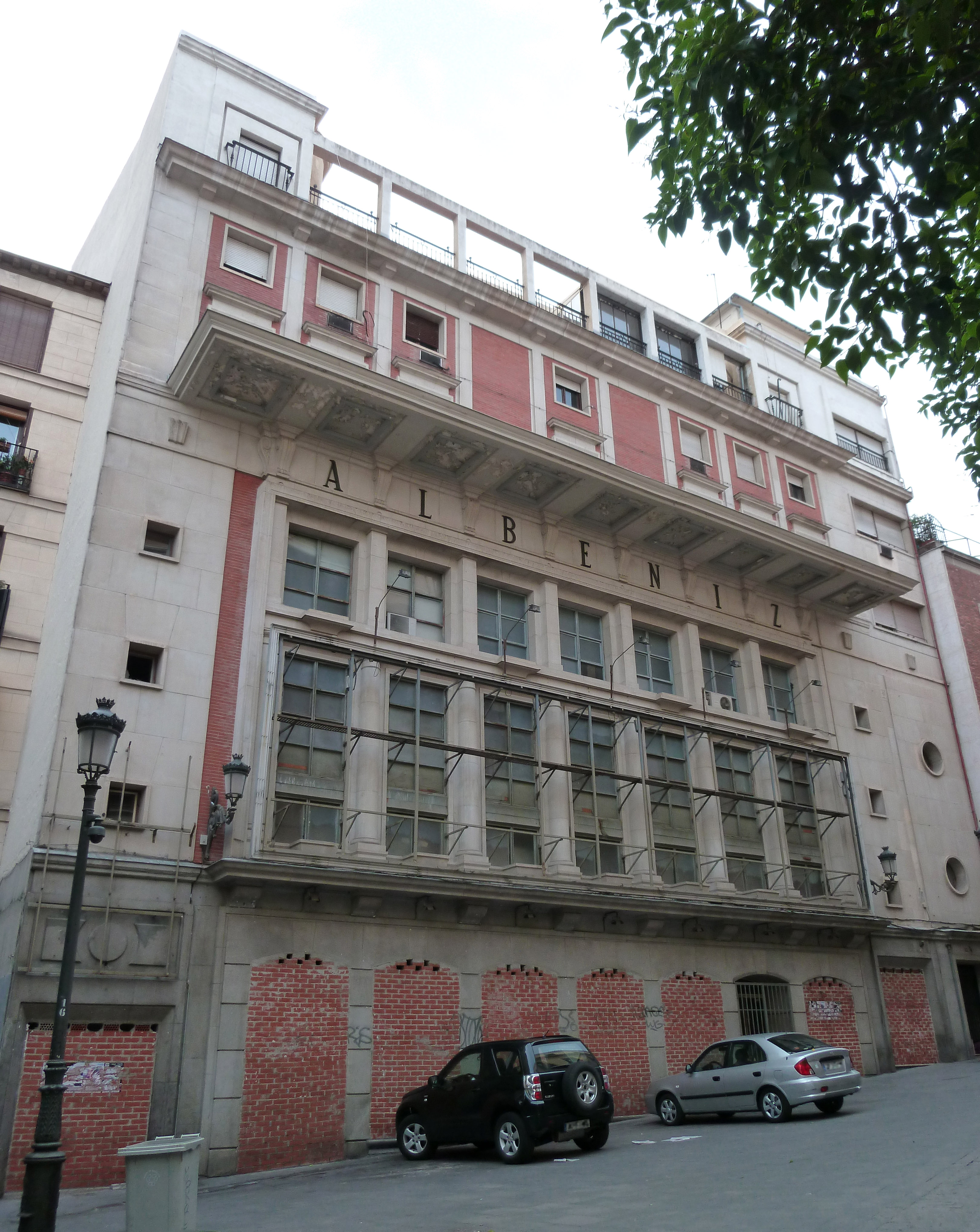
Teatro Albéniz

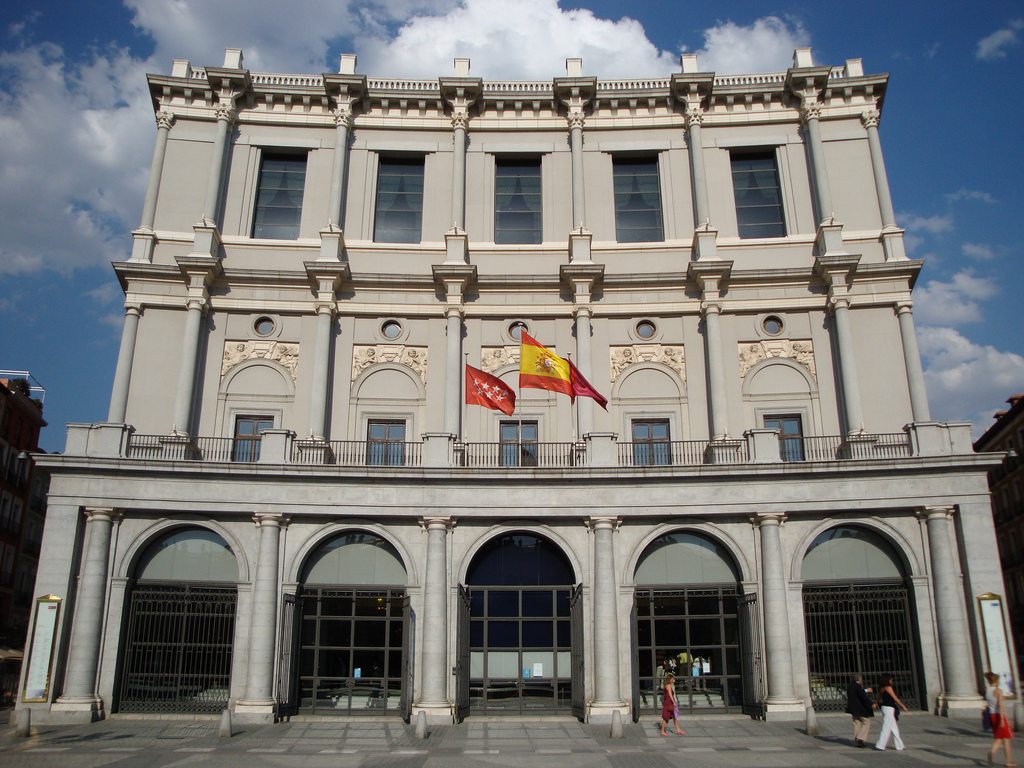
Teatro Real

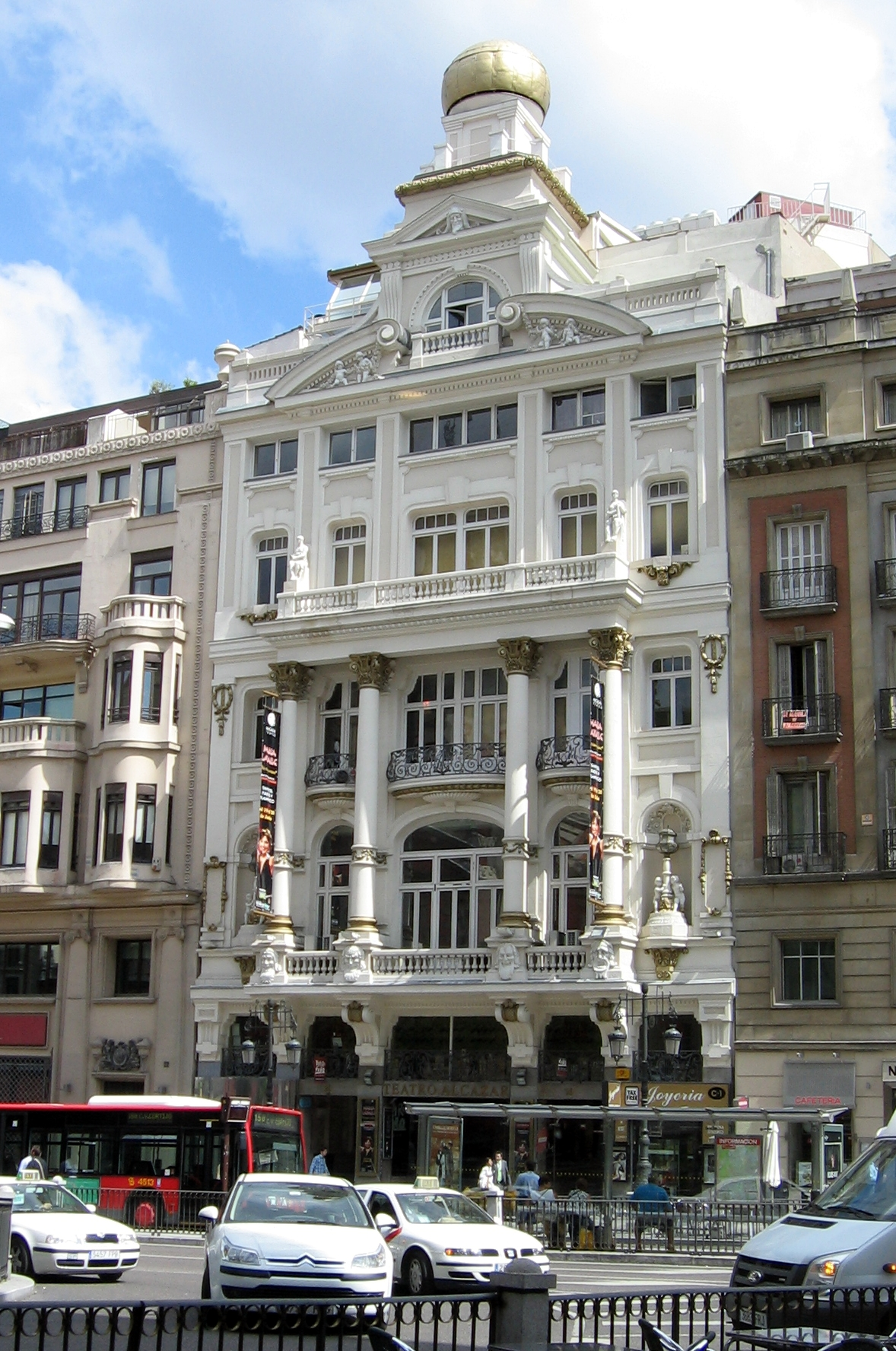
Teatro Alcázar

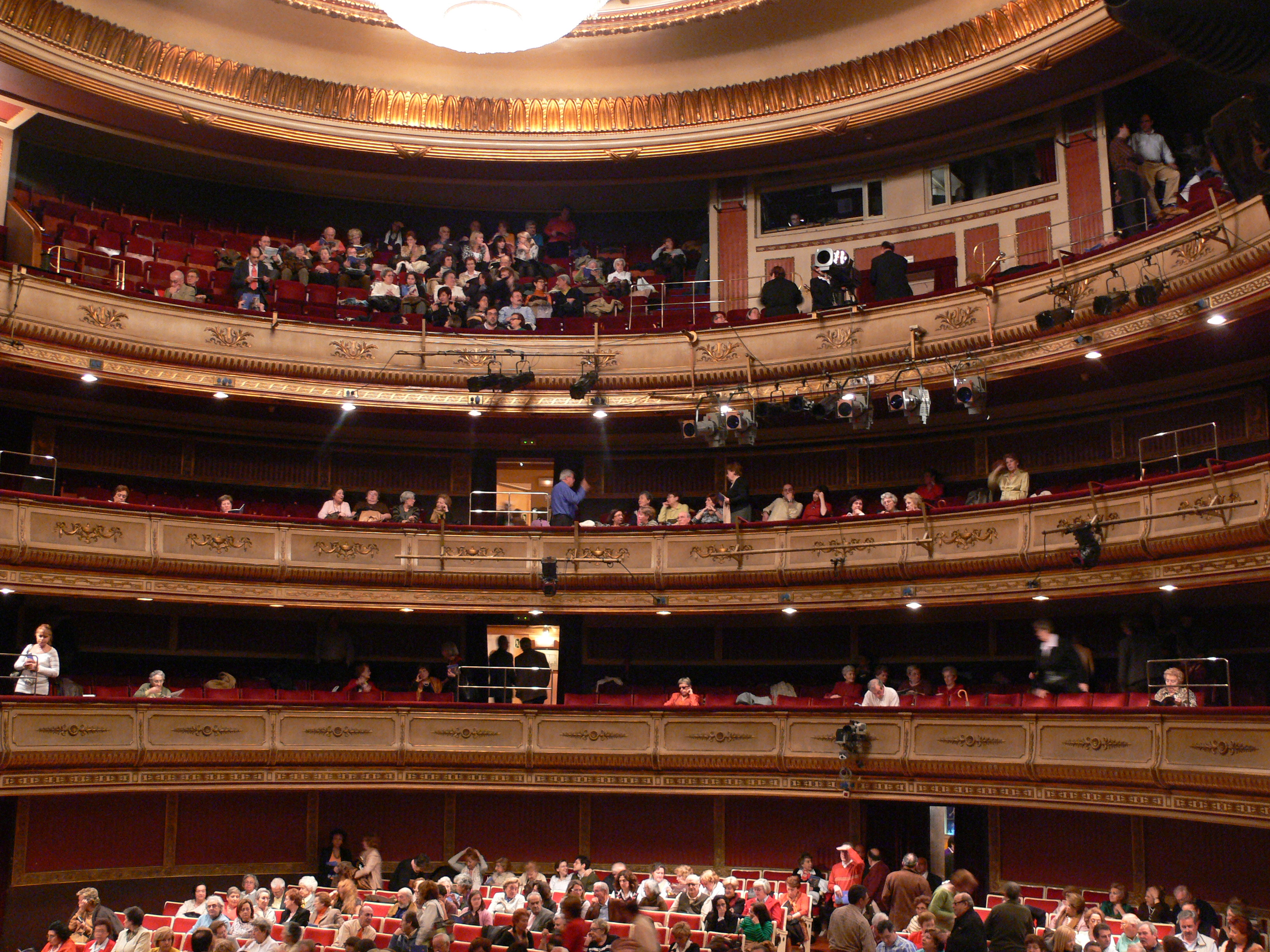
Teatro de la Zarzuela

== Murcia ==
- Teatro Apolo (El Algar)
- Auditorio y Centro de Congresos Víctor Villegas
- Auditorio y palacio de congresos El Batel
- Teatro Guerra
- Nuevo Teatro Circo
- Teatro romano de Cartagena
- Teatro Circo (Murcia)
- Teatro Romea (Murcia)

== Navarra ==
- Teatro Gayarre
- Palacio de Congresos y Auditorio de Navarra

== Valencia ==
- Teatro Chapí
- Teatro Cervantes (Santa Eulalia)
- Teatro Princesa
- Teatro Principal (Valencia)
