= María Antinea =

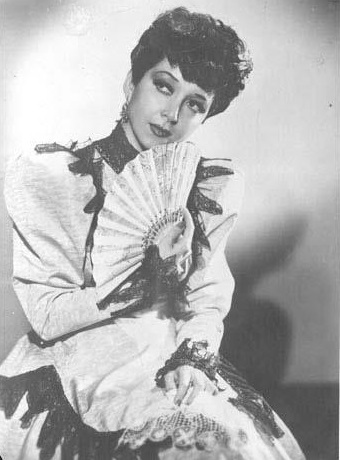
María Antinea

María Antinea (June 17, 1915 – July 29, 1991) was a Spanish actress, vedette, dancer, cupletista and tonadillera.

== Career ==
Antinea was born in Jaén in Andalusia in 1915. In the 1930s, Antinea joined the "Compañía campúa" of the Teatro Chueca in Madrid and began a career as a stage actress alongside the likes of Sarita Montiel, Pedrito Rico and Carmen Amaya. Antinea moved to Argentina in 1939, where she continued her theatre career, working alongside the likes of Tato Bores, Elina Colomer, Fernando Ochoa and Virginia Luque, among others.

In Argentina, Antinea appeared in a few films. She was cast by Leopoldo Torres Ríos to make her film debut in Los pagares de Mendieta (1939). In 1940, Antinea appeared in Explosivo 008, followed by a starring role on in 1945's Las aventuras de Frijolito y Robustiana. After appearing in the 1950 film La Doctora Castañuelas, she made her final film appearance in The Games Men Play in 1963.

== Personal life ==
Antinea was married to Felix Rodriguez, a bullfighter from Santander, Spain. They had a son, Felix Rodriguez Hueso. After they divorced, she moved to Argentina with her son; her mother, Pilar Hueso; and her brother, Manolo Martinez Hueso. In Argentina she met Enrique D. Kotliarenco, who became her manager. They later married and had a daughter, Maria Cristina Kotliarenco, who was born in 1955. Her husband died in 1978. She later moved to Texas in the United States, where she died on July 29, 1991.

== Filmography ==
- Los pagares de Mendieta (1939)
- Explosivo 008 (1940)
- Las aventuras de Frijolito y Robustiana (1945)
- La Doctora Castañuelas (1950)
- The Games Men Play (1963)
