= List of theatres and concert halls in Barcelona =

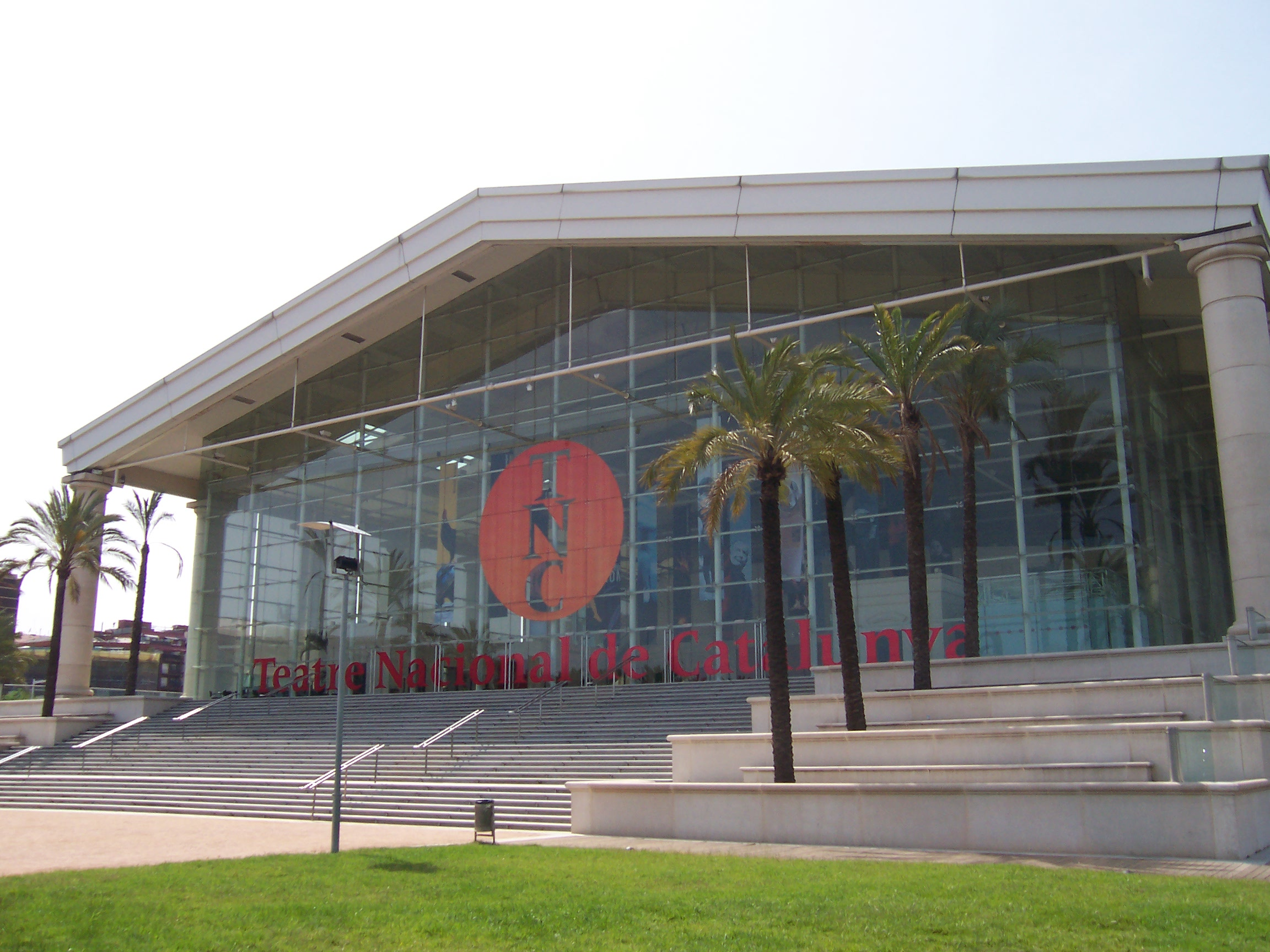
The postmodernist building of Teatre Nacional de Catalunya (TNC), designed by Ricardo Bofill.

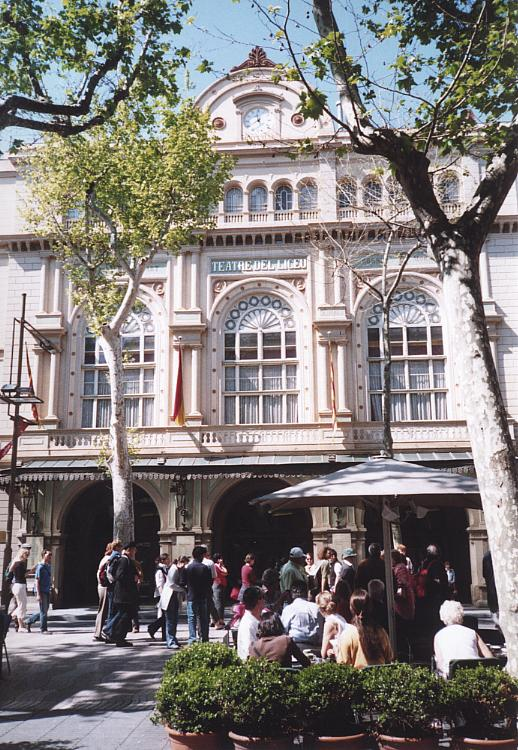
Gran Teatre del Liceu, the biggest opera house in Europe.

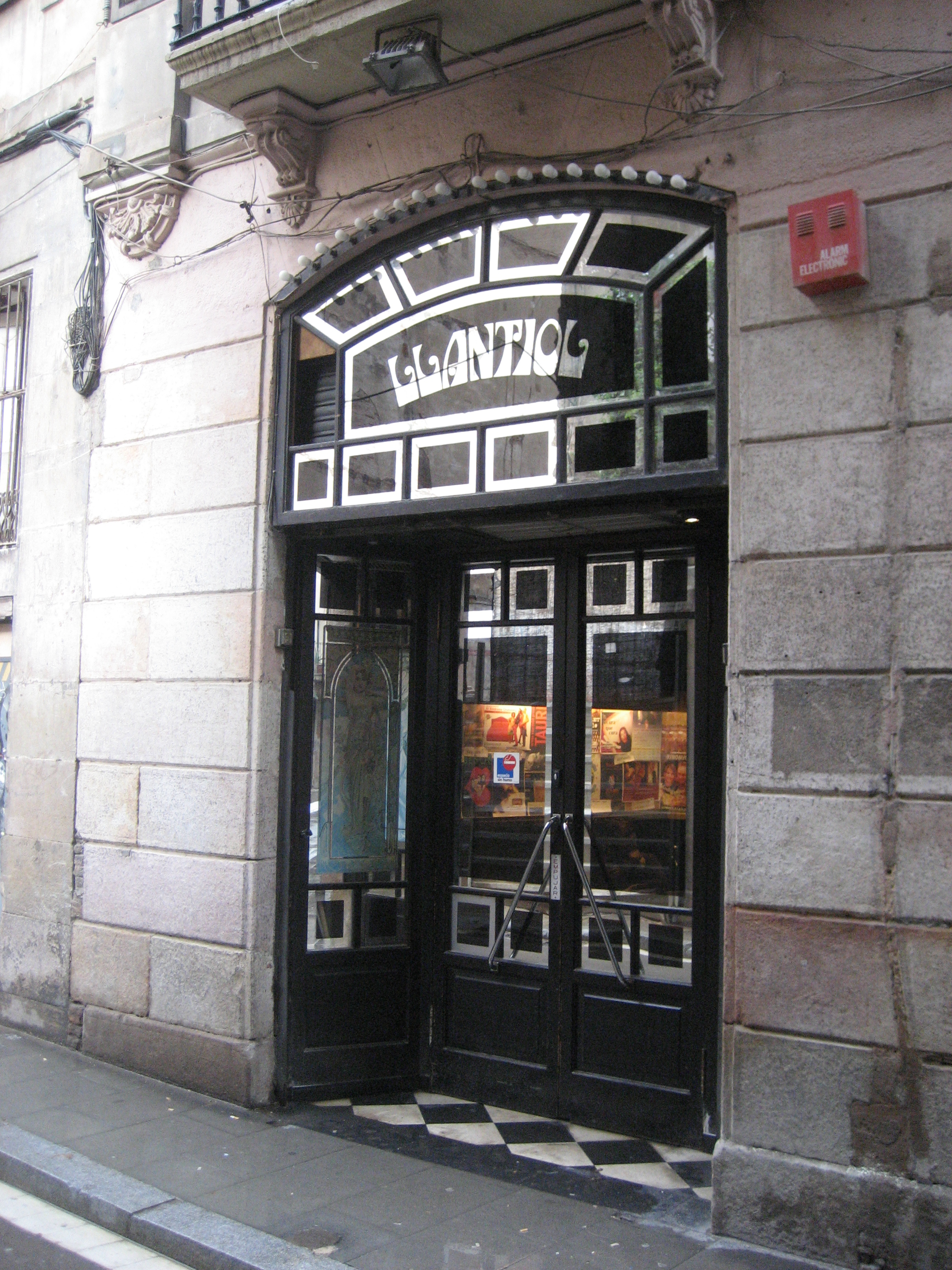
The small Cafè-Teatre Llantiol, with its modernista (Art Nouveau) design, in Barcelona's Raval.

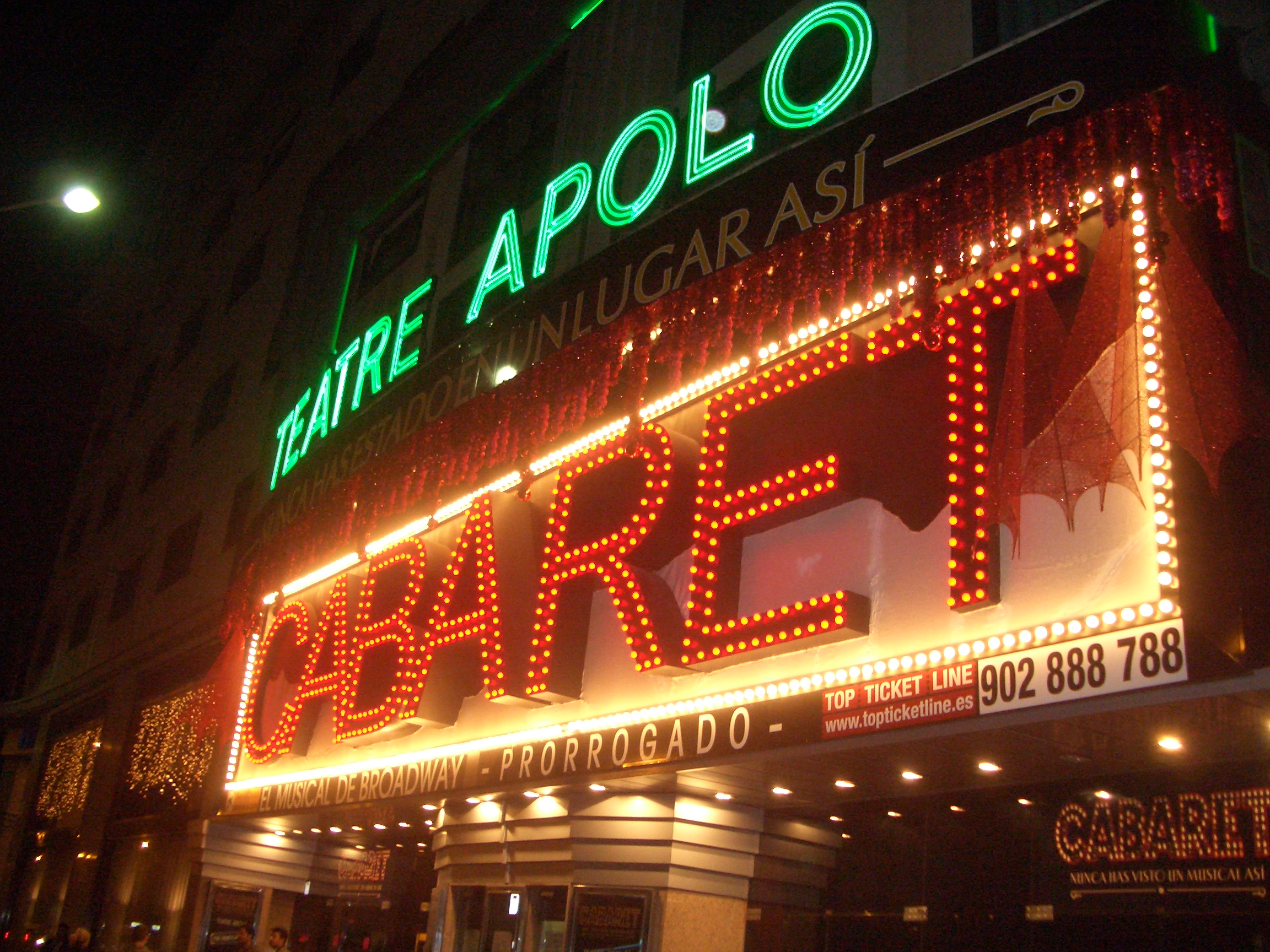
Teatre Apolo is a relic of the city's former cabaret district, Avinguda del Paral·lel.

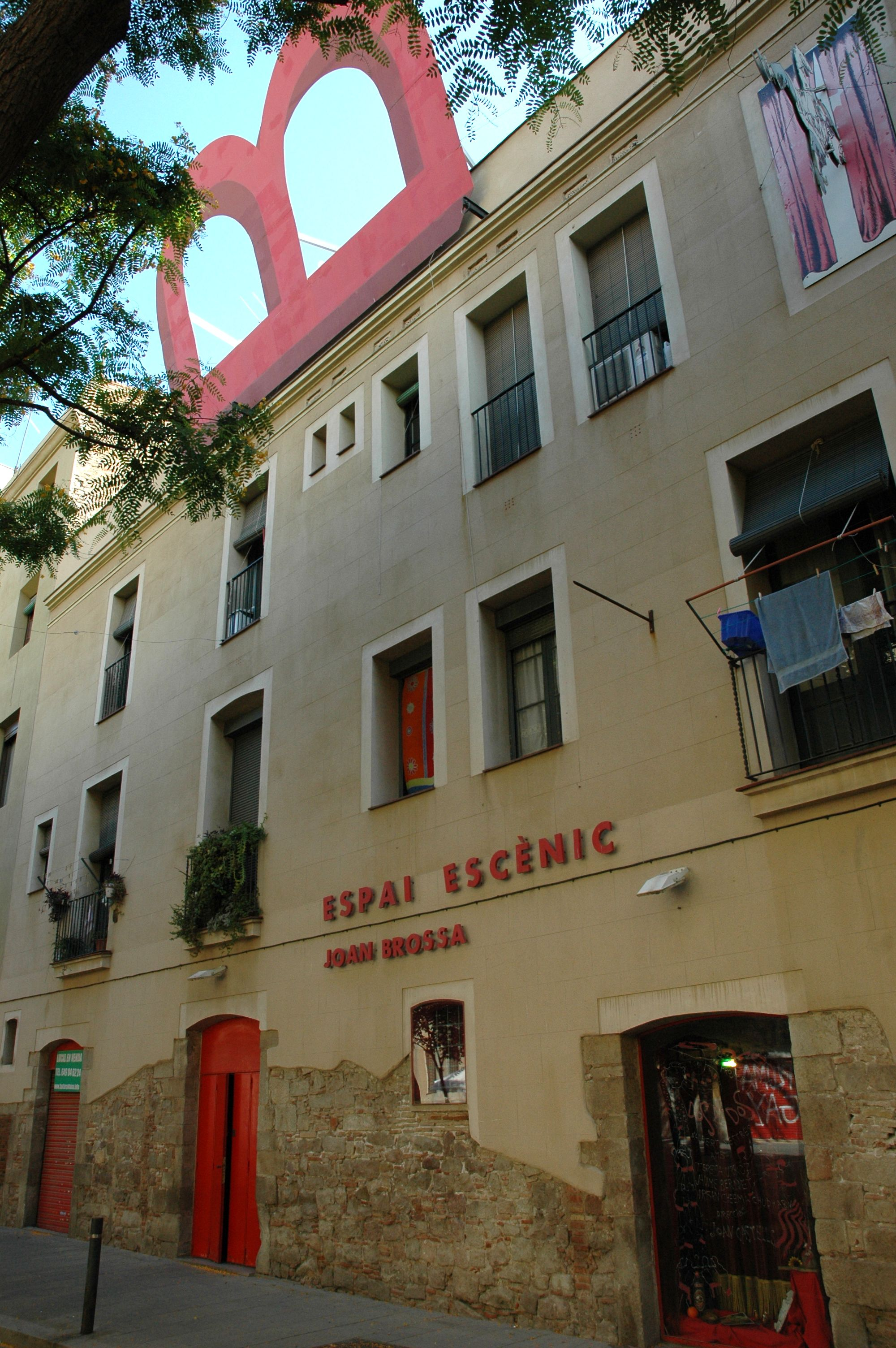
Brossa Espai Escènic, a small venue in El Born with more experimental plays, named after Joan Brossa.

This is a list of theatres and concert halls in Barcelona, Catalonia, Spain, and its surrounding metropolitan area.

== Theatres and concert venues in Barcelona ==
- L'Antic Teatre
- Auditori AXA
- Barcelona City Hall
- Barcelona Teatre Musical
- Biblioteca de Catalunya
- Brossa Espai Escènic
- Cafè-Teatre Llantiol
- Círcol Maldà
- Club Capitol
- Club Helena
- Coliseum
- Espai Navae
- El Liceu, Barcelona's opera house
- El Molino, emblematic cabaret venue on the Paral·lel, reopened in October 2010.
- Fundació Joan Miró
- Guasch Teatre
- Jove Teatre Regina
- L'Auditori
- La Farinera del Clot
- La Puntual, specializing in puppet shows.
- La Riereta Teatre
- Mercat de les Flors
  - Sala Aurèlia Capmany
  - Sala Ovidi Montllor
- Nau Ivanow
- Palau de la Música Catalana
- Palau Sant Jordi
- Porta 4
- Sala Atrium
- Sala Beckett
- Sala BeCool
- Sala El Off
- Sala Màgic
- Sala Muntaner, theatre
- Sala Raval
- Sala Razzmatazz (former Zeleste)
- Sant Andreu Teatre
- Sidecar Factory Club
- Tantarantana Teatre
- Teatre Apolo
- Teatre Aquitània
- Teatre Artèria Paral·lel
- Teatre Borràs
- Teatre CCCB (Centre de Cultura Contemporània de Barcelona)
- Teatre Centre de Gràcia
- Teatre Condal
- Teatre del Raval, carrer Sant Antoni Abat 12
- Teatre Gaudí de Barcelona, musicals
- Teatre Goya
- Teatre Grec, an amphitheatre styled on the Ancient Greek theatres. On Montjuïc
- Teatre Lliure, Montjuïc
    - Sala Fabià Puigserver
    - Espai Lliure
- Teatre Nacional de Catalunya
- Teatre Novedades
- Teatre Poliorama
- Teatre Principal (Barcelona)
- Teatre Romea
- Teatre Tivoli
- Teatre Victòria
- Teatreneu
- Versus Teatre
- Villarroel Teatre

== Theatre festivals ==
- Festival Grec de Barcelona

== Former or closed theatres ==
- Artenbrut
- Teatre Arnau, emblematic theatre on the Paral·lel.
- Teatre Belle Epoque
- Teatre Malic, formerly the smallest venue in town, emblematic for long years.
- Teatro Mayor

== Institut del Teatre ==
- Institut del Teatre
  - Sala Maria Plans
  - Teatre Alegria
  - Teatre Estudi
  - Teatre Laboratori
  - Teatre Ovidi Montllor

== Theatres and concert venues in the metropolitan area of Barcelona ==
- Atrium Viladecans, in Viladecans
- Auditori de Cornellà, in Cornellà de Llobregat
- Auditori Miquel Martí i Pol, in Sant Joan Despí
- Estraperlo (Club del Ritme), in Badalona
- Círcol Catòlic, in Badalona
- Foment Cultural i Artístic, in Sant Joan Despí
- Fundació La Roda, in Montcada i Reixac
- Salamandra, in L'Hospitalet de Llobregat
- Teatre Blas Infante, in Badalona
- Teatre Joventut, in L'Hospitalet de Llobregat
- Teatre Mercè Rodoreda, in Sant Joan Despí
- Teatre Núria Espert, in Sant Andreu de la Barca
- Teatre Principal, in Badalona
- Teatre Sagarra, in Santa Coloma de Gramenet
- Teatre Zorrilla, in Badalona

== See also ==
- Culture of Barcelona
- Avinguda del Paral·lel
- Àlex Ollé, an artistic director of La Fura dels Baus
