= Explosivo 008 =

- Directed by: James Bauer
- Written by: James Bauer, Fred Heller
- Produced by: Santiago Salviche
- Starring: María Antinea, Lea Conti, Pablo Cumo, María de la Fuente
- Cinematography: Bernardo Spoliansky
- Edited by: Bernardo Spoliansky
- Music by: Francisco Canaro, Rodolfo Sachs
- Release date: 1940
- Running time: 63 minutes
- Country: Argentina
- Language: Spanish

Explosivo 008 is a 1940 Argentine crime film directed by German exiled filmmaker James Bauer during the Golden Age of Argentine cinema.

== Cast ==
- María Antinea
- Lea Conti
- Pablo Cumo
- María de la Fuente
- Fausto Etchegoin
- Vicente Padula
- Joaquín Petrocino
- Juan Sarcione
- Nicolás Taricano
- Felipe Panigazzi
- Ilze Gonda
