= Teatro Emperador =

Theater in León, Spain

Emperador Theater
- Teatro Emperador
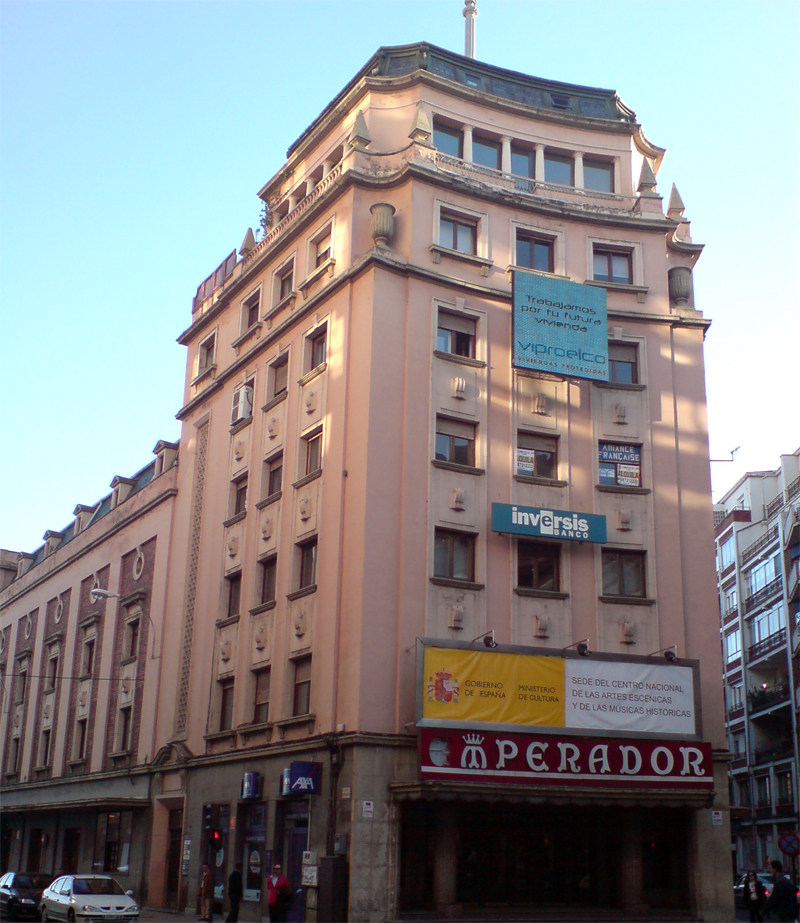
- Interactive map of the Emperador Theater area

General information
- Type: Opera and Theater
- Location: León, Spain
- Coordinates: 42.596222°N 5.571472°W
- Completed: September 22, 1951
- Opened: September 22, 1951
- Closed: 2006
- Owner: Ministry of Culture

Design and construction
- Architects: Manuel de Cárdenas Pastor, Gonzalo de Cárdenas Pastor and Francisco J. Sanz

The Teatro Emperador (English: Emperador Theatre), designed in 1949 by the Madrid architect Manuel de Cárdenas Pastor in collaboration with Gonzalo de Cárdenas Pastor and Francisco J. Sanz and inaugurated in 1951, is an important and emblematic Spanish theater of the capital of León, located in the expansion of the city and protected by the municipal regulations of 1980. The building was used as a cinema and performance hall from its inauguration until 2006, when it was closed to the public. Three years later, in 2009, the theater was acquired by the General State Administration, with the intention of locating in it the National Center for Performing Arts and Historical Music. The project, however, was unsuccessful and the theater remained closed.

== History ==
=== Project development ===
The Teatro Emperador was commissioned by Empresa Leonesa de Espectáculos S.A., which at that time monopolized all the cinematographic exhibition and therefore the theatrical representation of the city, to the architects Manuel de Cárdenas Pastor, Gonzalo de Cárdenas Pastor and Francisco J. Sanz Martínez. The first project, presented in December 1946 by Manuel and Gonzalo de Cárdenas, contemplated the occupation of only half of the plot and proposed an exclusively cinematographic function, with a capacity for 1,378 people, 882 in the stalls and 492 in the amphitheater, who had segregated access to their seats, taking the class stratification prevailing at the time to the limit.

In 1947, the old project was discarded and a request was submitted for the emptying and support of the entire site occupied by the Emperador, presenting a single plan for the foundations that already affected the entire site. Thus, shortly after, a new project was presented, which included several notorious changes with respect to the previous one of 1946. The new project presented a multipurpose hall, since it contemplated both theatrical performances and cinematographic exhibitions, with a capacity practically the same as the initial one, of 1,367 seats, distributed differently from the initial project, with 670 in the stalls, 264 in the mezzanine, 383 in the amphitheater and 50 in ten boxes.

The process ends in December 1949, when a fourth and definitive project is presented, to which is added the signature of the local architect Francisco J. Sanz for the extension of two floors in the tower of the chamfer, thus satisfying the city council, which demanded a design that would provide a greater package and height that would embellish the square at the confluence of Santa Nonia and Independencia. The building was completed on September 22, 1951, two years later.

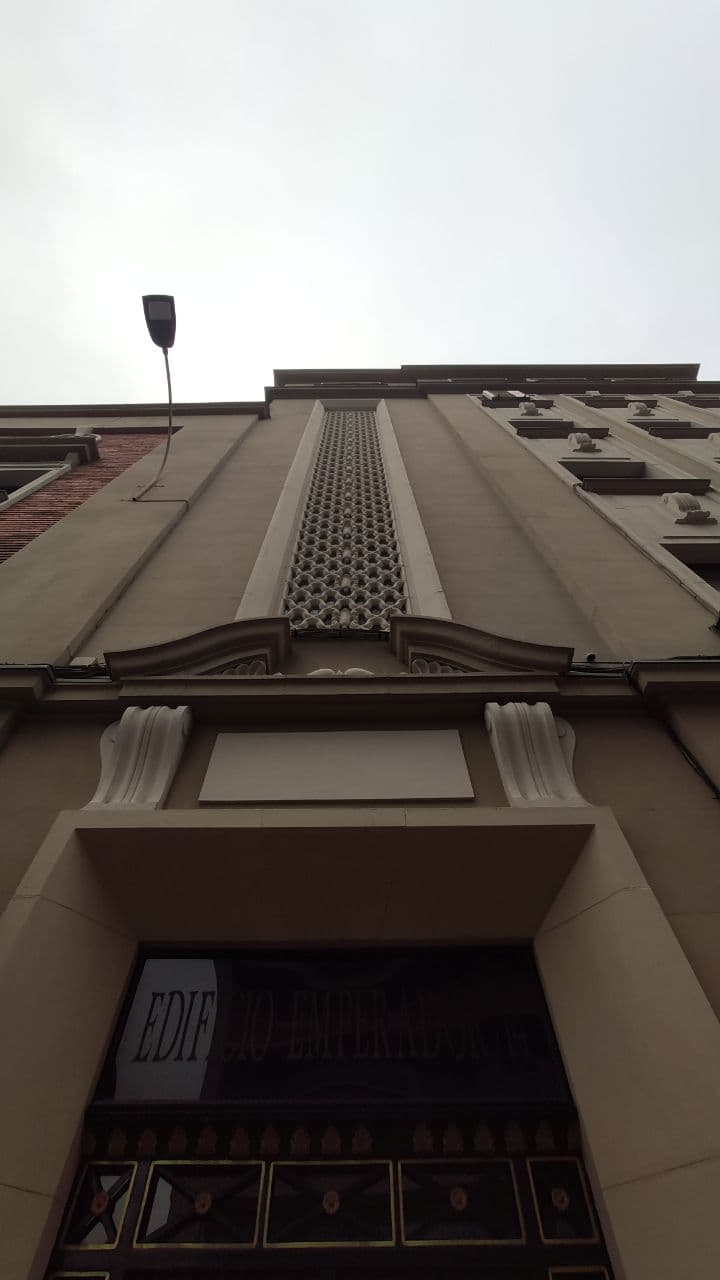

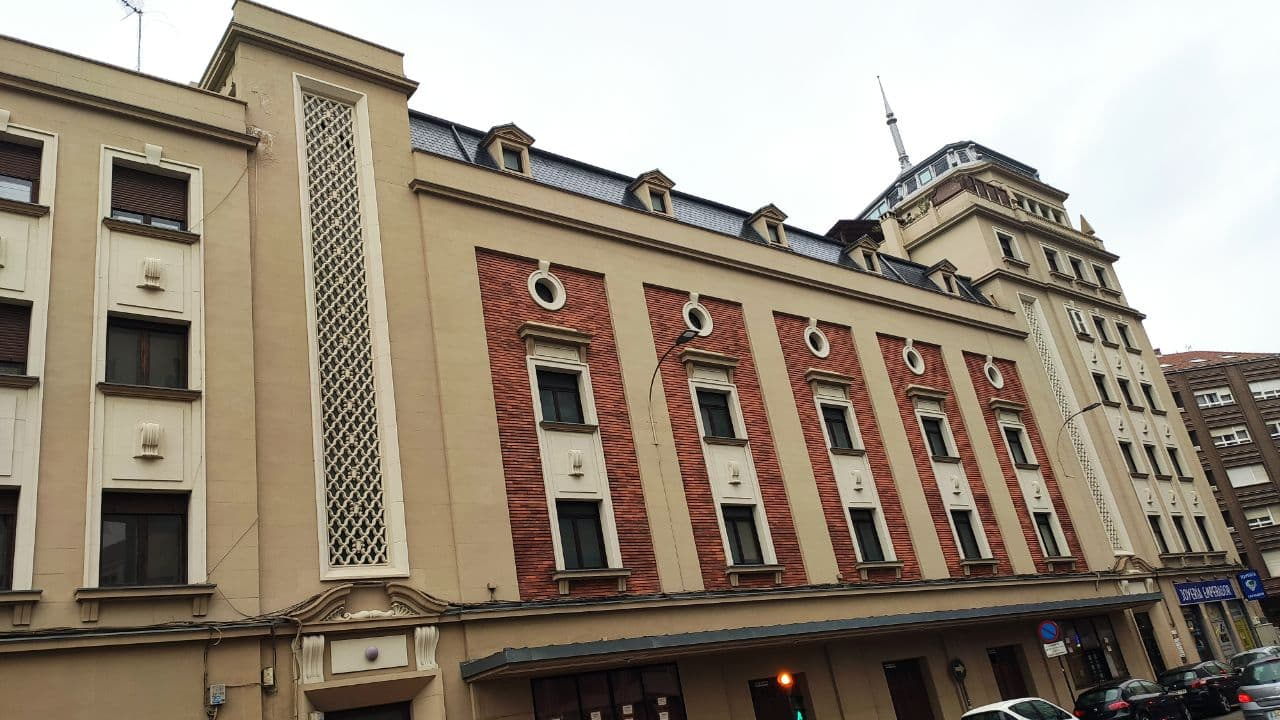

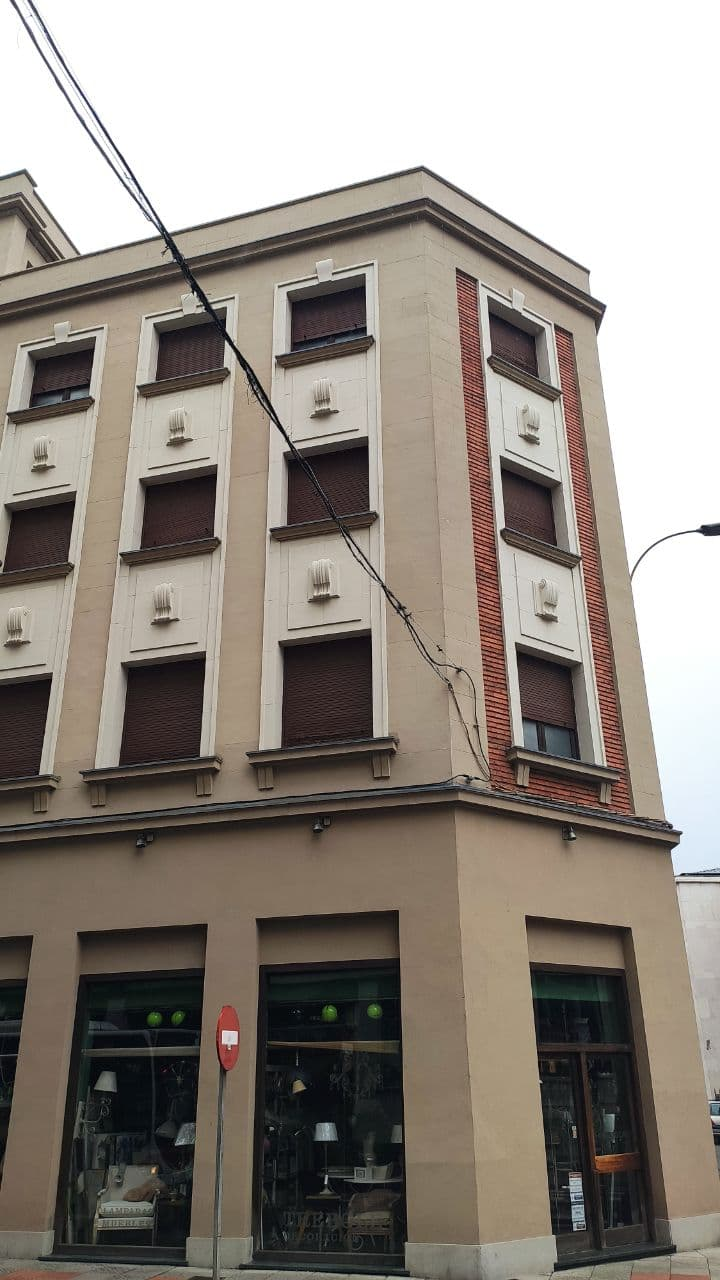

=== National Center for the Performing Arts ===
After remaining in uninterrupted operation since its inauguration in 1951, due to the impossibility of remaining open, it had to be closed in 2006. The situation caused great commotion in the city's society, which demanded that the city council purchase the building, something that finally took place in May 2007, 186 days after the closure, after the municipality paid 4.4 million euros to the company that owned it, Empresa Leonesa de Espectáculos. The plans for the building on the part of the León City Council at that time were to recover its theatrical function and for its restoration to be carried out by the León savings bank, Caja España and the Junta of Castile and León.

However, with the change of political color in the city council after the March 2007 elections, plans for the use of the theater changed. Thus, the Ministry of Culture bought the building for 4.7 million euros from the City Council and announced the creation of the National Center for Performing Arts and Historical Music. According to the Ministry, the theater would be reopened in 2011, after an investment of 5.5 million euros, which would affect the complete restoration of the building to resume the appearance raised in the project of Manuel de Cárdenas Pastor slightly varying the interior of the building, with a reduction of the capacity of the current 1367 to about 1200, to comply with current European regulations without preventing the theater from receiving all kinds of musical, scenic and choreographic events of medium format. The project was never implemented and the building, unused, was put up for auction in 2014, without finding buyers.

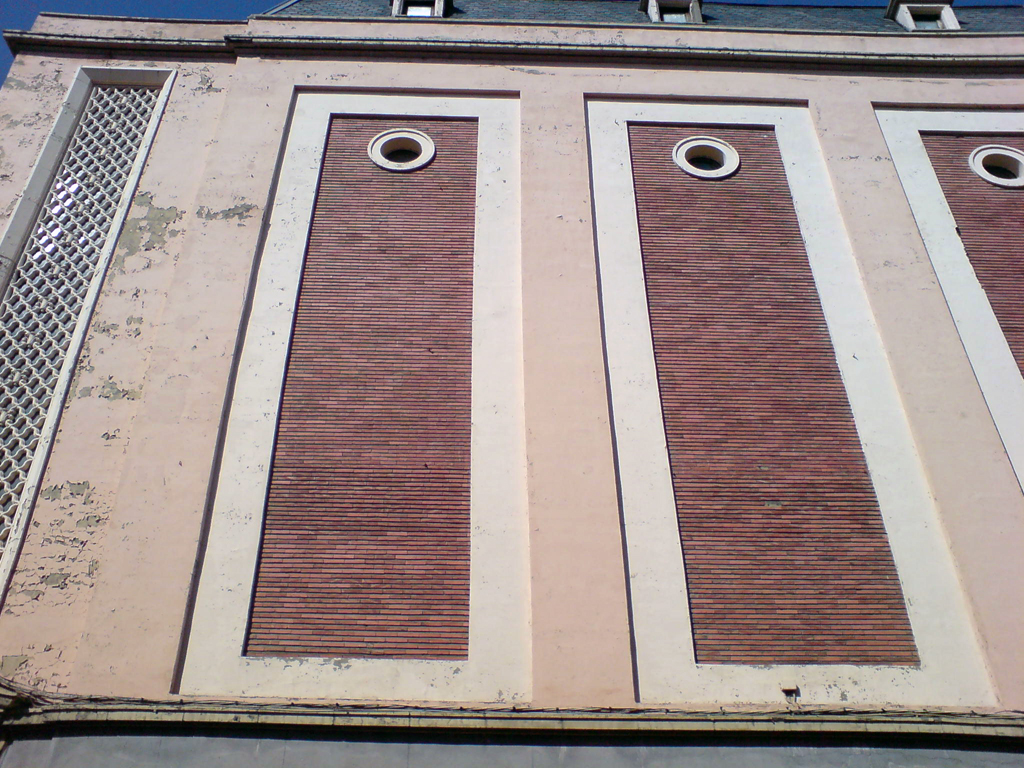

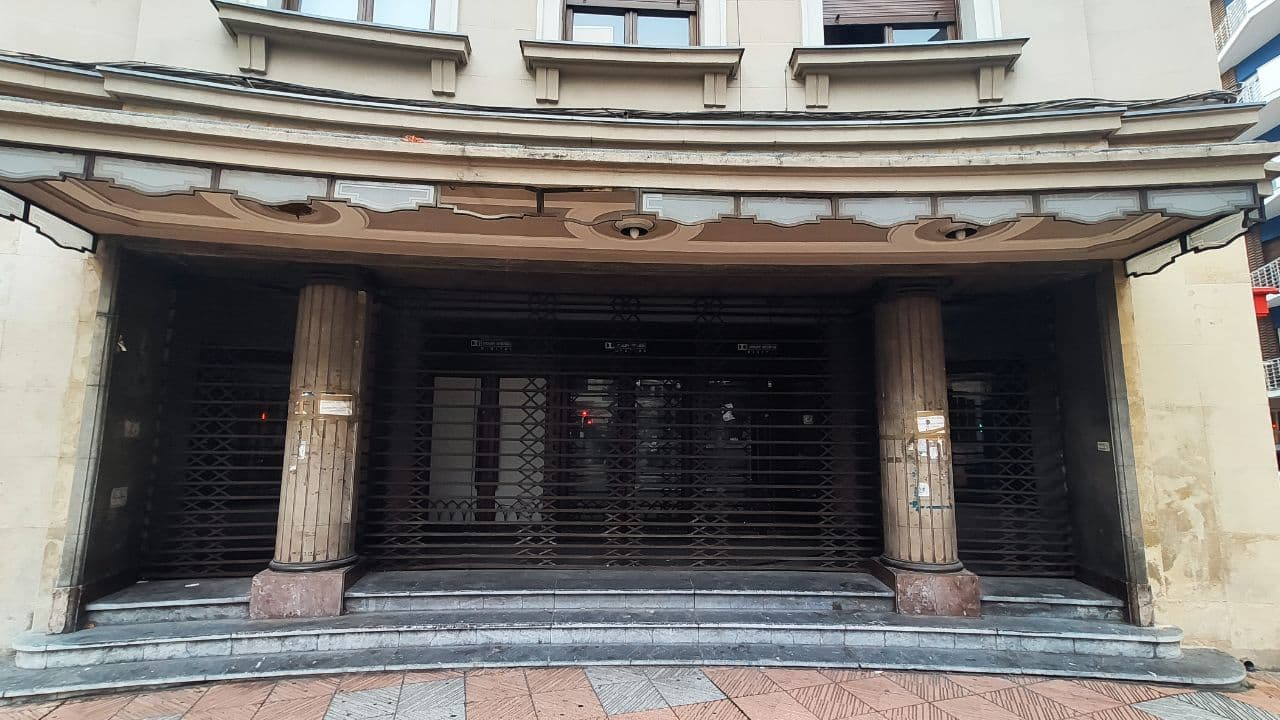

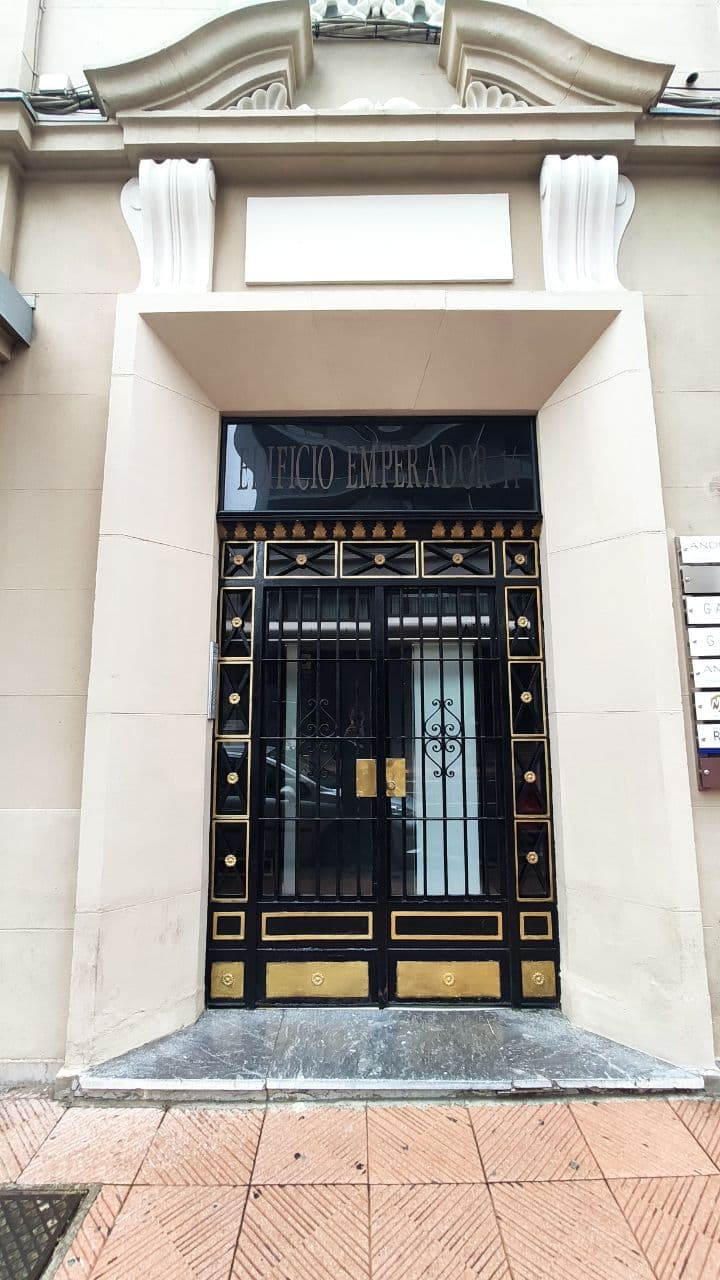

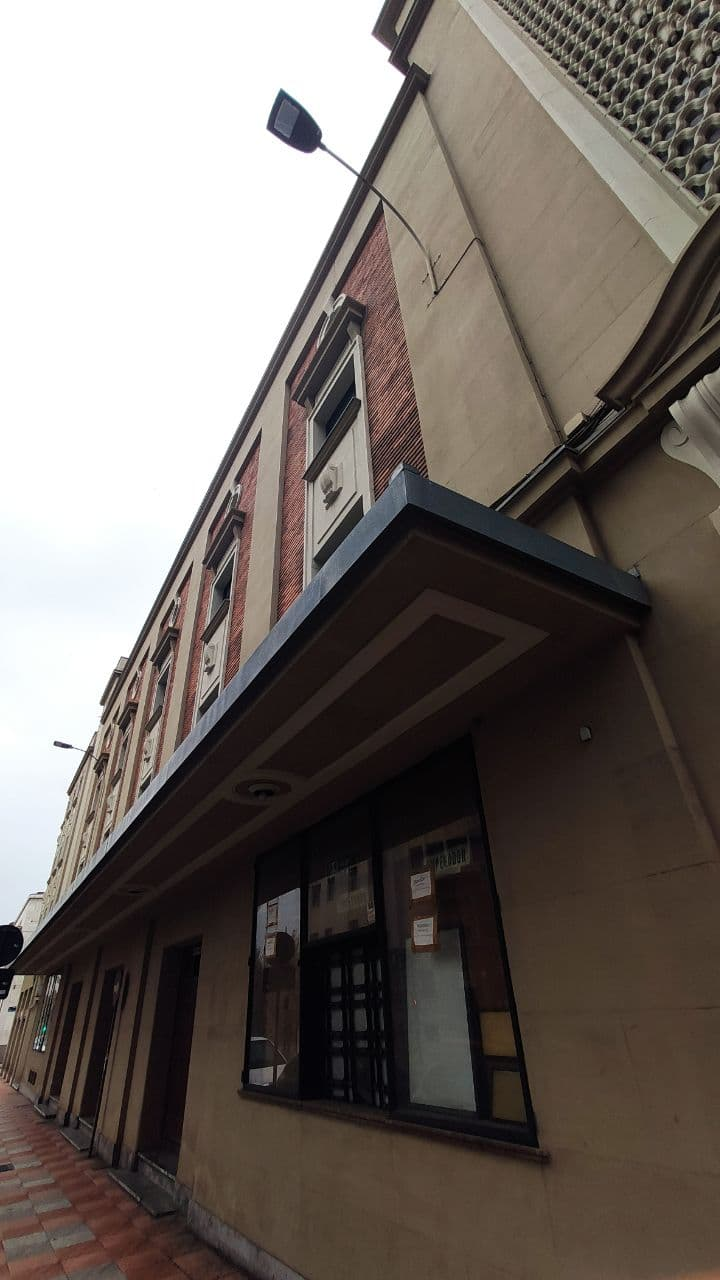

=== Current status ===
The building has three owners: Instituto Nacional de las Artes Escénicas y de la Música (INAEM), the Leonese entertainment company and a private individual, who are responsible for its maintenance despite the fact that it is still closed to the public. The study to return the building to activity certified that the building had not suffered too much since its closure in 2006, so that the start-up would require an update of the building to meet the new regulatory requirements. Thus, the actions necessary for the restart of the activity are:

- Repairs and structural adaptation of roofs and building envelope.
- Accessibility through the removal of architectural barriers.
- Sectorization and evacuation of public areas.
- Adequacy and provision of dressing rooms and toilets for audience and staff.
- Intervention on the music pit, scenery and stage.
- Updating and renovation of the building's general infrastructure installations.
- Cleaning and repair of interior elements.
- Technical stage equipment.
- Urbanization of the surroundings, adaptation of accesses and canopies.

A series of actions that together would raise the bill for its implementation to 3,084,383.87 euros according to the study.

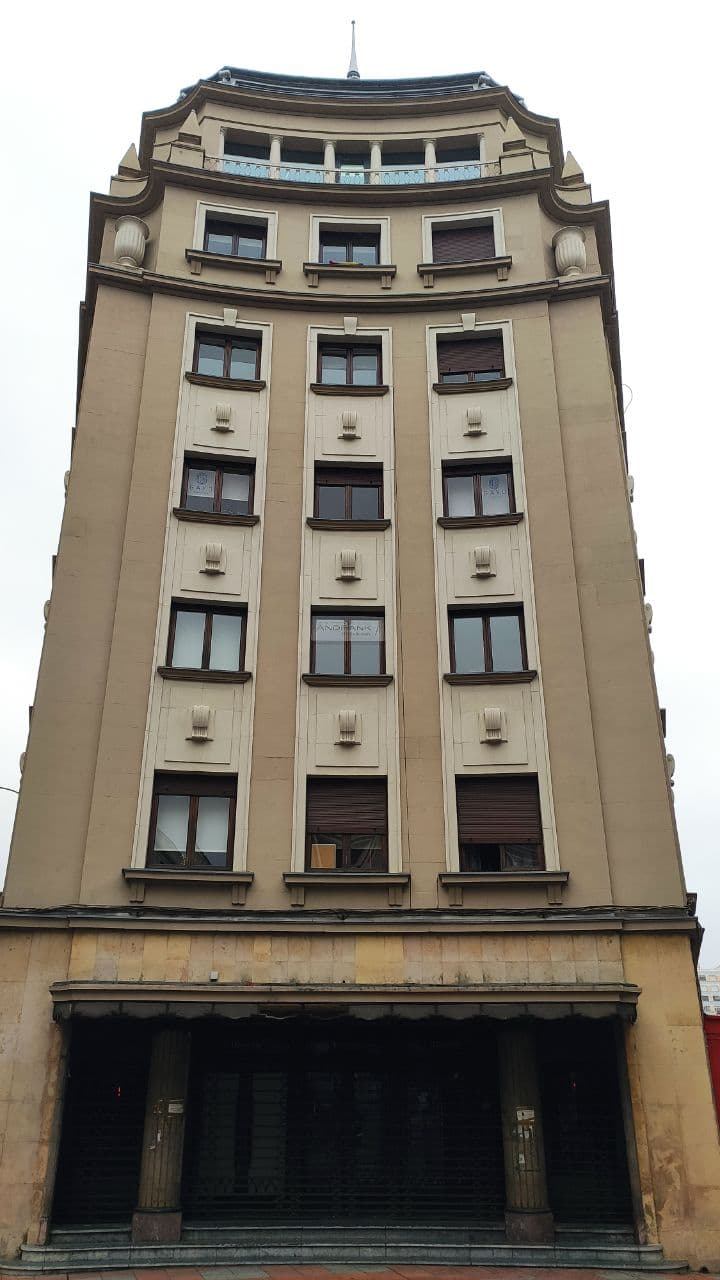

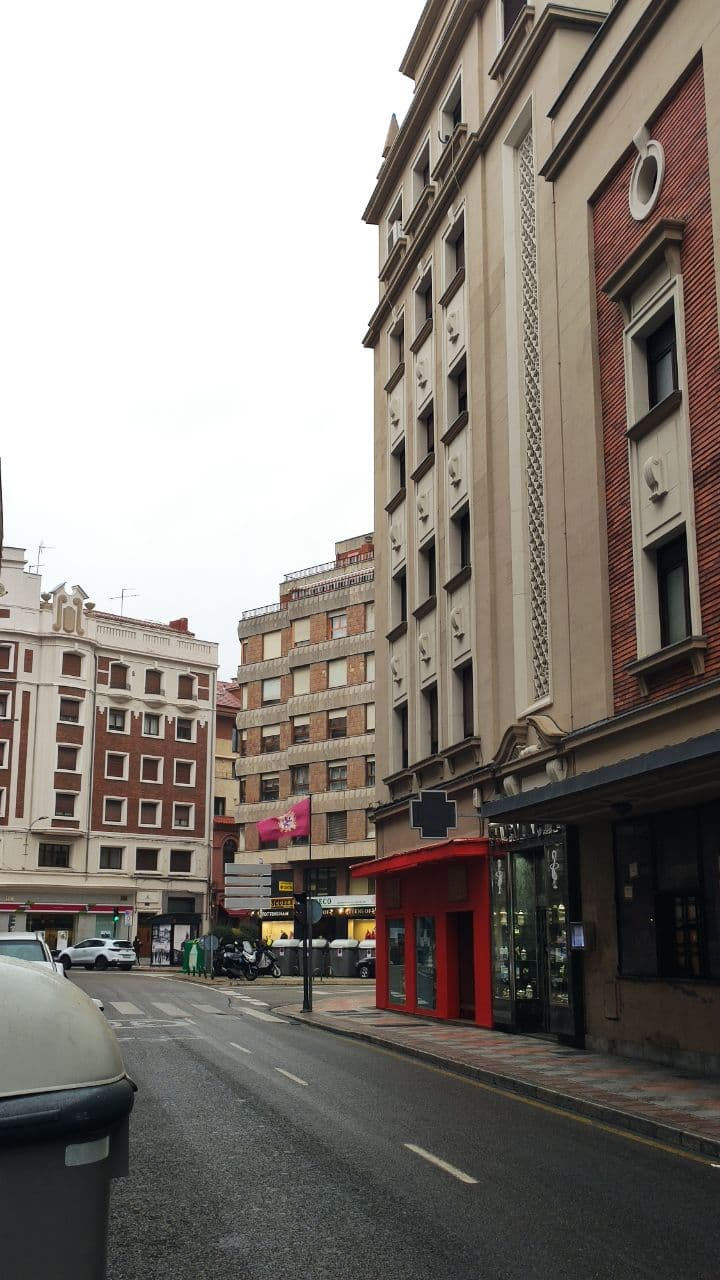

== Building ==
The Teatro Emperador is a building included in the catalog of protected assets and elements of the special plan for the urban ensemble of the city of León (PECU). Its degree of protection is therefore level 2, which corresponds to a comprehensive type of protection, justifying it in the way the building has to solve an important crossroads in the widening of León. The built complex is resolved with a main volume housing the theater and cinematograph, a set of premises on the first floor where different stores are located and several outbuildings in height where there are various uses of offices, hostel and housing. The building has five floors, basement, ground floor and three more, although it rises to one more at the top as a tower on the chamfered corner with Independencia and Santa Nonia.

=== Interior layout ===
The floor plan of the building contrasts the horseshoe shape of the hall, inserted in the center, with the polygonal perimeter of the building as a whole, which is trapezoidal in shape. This contrast is resolved by occupying the open space with tertiary or residential uses, such as offices or housing. The development of the plot seeks to resolve in a monumental way a landmark of the city's expansion.

Because of its multipurpose nature, the organization of the hall is conditioned by the almost impossible compromise between the requirements of the theater, which advise a focal arrangement of the stalls versus the parallelism of the seats with the screen, inherent to the projection of cinema. In this dilemma, the architects opted for the dramatic function by adopting the typical theatrical horseshoe shape, although they tried to correct the disadvantages for the cinematic spectacle by aligning the rows of seats on the mezzanine and the amphitheater. Paradoxically, the stage is tiny, only 13 meters wide and 10 meters deep, with a reduced free height; in short, an insufficient stage for any kind of performance. The main hall is organized in the Italian style, with a courtyard and stalls on the first floor and a double amphitheater on the first and third floors. There are boxes on both the first and second floors. The stage space consists of an orchestra pit, the stage itself and a stage tower with galleries. The stage has a limited area, as mentioned above, of 178 m^{2} and an orchestra pit of 35 m^{2}. The seating area of the stalls is 385 m^{2}, with a capacity of 836 seats, not counting the 6 stalls, the 18 boxes and the second amphitheater.

The theater is equipped with dressing rooms, toilets, two lockers and a checkroom, as well as technical booths on the first and third floors. Access to the different elements of the theater is resolved with a lobby where there is a large marble staircase that connects the ground and first floors creating a foyer on two levels.

The interior of the room is practically intact in its original state and represents a compendium of ornamentation that feigns a fictitious material nobility based on the plaster decoration, warm tones, gilded elements, curtains and carpets.

=== Facade ===
The external image, perfectly symmetrical, seeks to mask the internal diversity. The openings that correspond to the theater adopt domestic forms that functionally may be inappropriate, in favor of an assimilation of the openings that serve residential or tertiary uses. Based on this criterion, the architectural style used is the most common at the time, imperial neo-historicism, characterized by being symmetrical, severe, well-proportioned and moderately ornamented in singular points.

The facade is fragmented into the three classic bands. The one-story plinth is entirely associated with cinematographic and theatrical use. The three main sides are topped with awnings to protect the public gathered on the street. The central strip is composed vertically, arranging the openings in several series of columns, one for each identifiable area of the elevations. The stairwells are illuminated by a slit opening, veiled by a lattice molded in situ, which accentuates the verticality, while providing a rhythmic counterpoint to the uniform generality. In the lower section, the cornice is formed by the roof skirt, finished in slate, in neo-Herrerian fashion, and by dormers that establish a reference with the composition of openings in the lower face.

In the chamfered tower, the cornice splits into two floors framed by powerful molding lines and crowned with a pinnacle, with the same neo-Herrerian style. The rear façade has many concomitants with the Trianon theater, which leads us to give Sanz's contribution to the project greater weight than is recognized. This front was conceived with the erroneous idea that the adjoining lot, publicly owned, would be dedicated to a garden area, which was not the case in the end, as the lot was occupied by the Leonese Institute of Culture.

== See also ==
- León, Spain

== Bibliography ==
- Alegre Alonso, Joaquín (2020). León bimilenaria (in Spanish). Rimpego. ISBN 978-84-16610-26-6.
- Algorri García, Eloy (2000). "Colegio Oficial de Arquitectos de León". León, Casco Antiguo y Ensanche, Guía de Arquitectura (in Spanish). Director del Equipo. ISBN 84-607-1207-9.
- Ponga Mayo, Juan Carlos (2014). Apuntes para la historia de la ciudad de León (in Spanish). Cultural Norte. ISBN 978-84-940151-7-5.
- Serrano, Secundino (1991). "La Crónica de León". Enciclopedia de León (in Spanish). Vol. 1. Director del Equipo. ISBN 84-920557-4-X.
- Serrano, Secundino (1991). "La Crónica de León". Enciclopedia de León (in Spanish). Vol. 2. Director del Equipo. ISBN 84-920557-5-8.
