= Coliseum (Barcelona) =

Theatre and cinema in Barcelona, Spain

Coordinates: 41°23′17″N 2°09′58″E

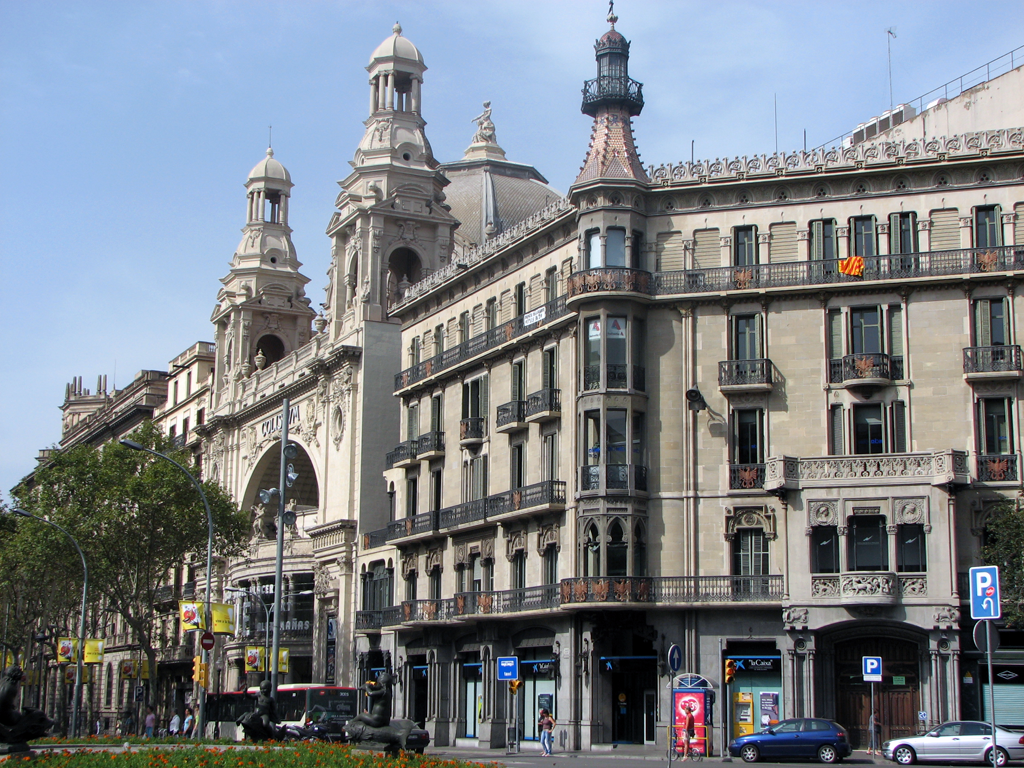
Coliseum.

Coliseum or Cinema Coliseum is a theatre and cinema in Barcelona, located on 595–599 Gran Via de les Corts Catalanes, in the intersection with Rambla de Catalunya. It opened in 1923 and remains one of the biggest film theatres in the city as well of an iconic building of 1920s monumental architecture. The venue currently holds 1,700 people.

== The building ==
It was designed by Francesc de Paula Nebot, in an eclectic style closely related to the French Beaux Arts movement, and partially based upon the Opera Garnier in Paris. Among the artists in charge of its profuse ornamentation and luxurious decoration are Pere Ricart, Fernández Casals, Gonçal Batlle and Torra Pasan. It was severely endangered by the 1937 air raids during the Spanish Civil War.

== See also ==
- List of theatres and concert halls in Barcelona
