= Teatro Alcázar =

Coordinates: 40°25′4″N 3°41′57″W

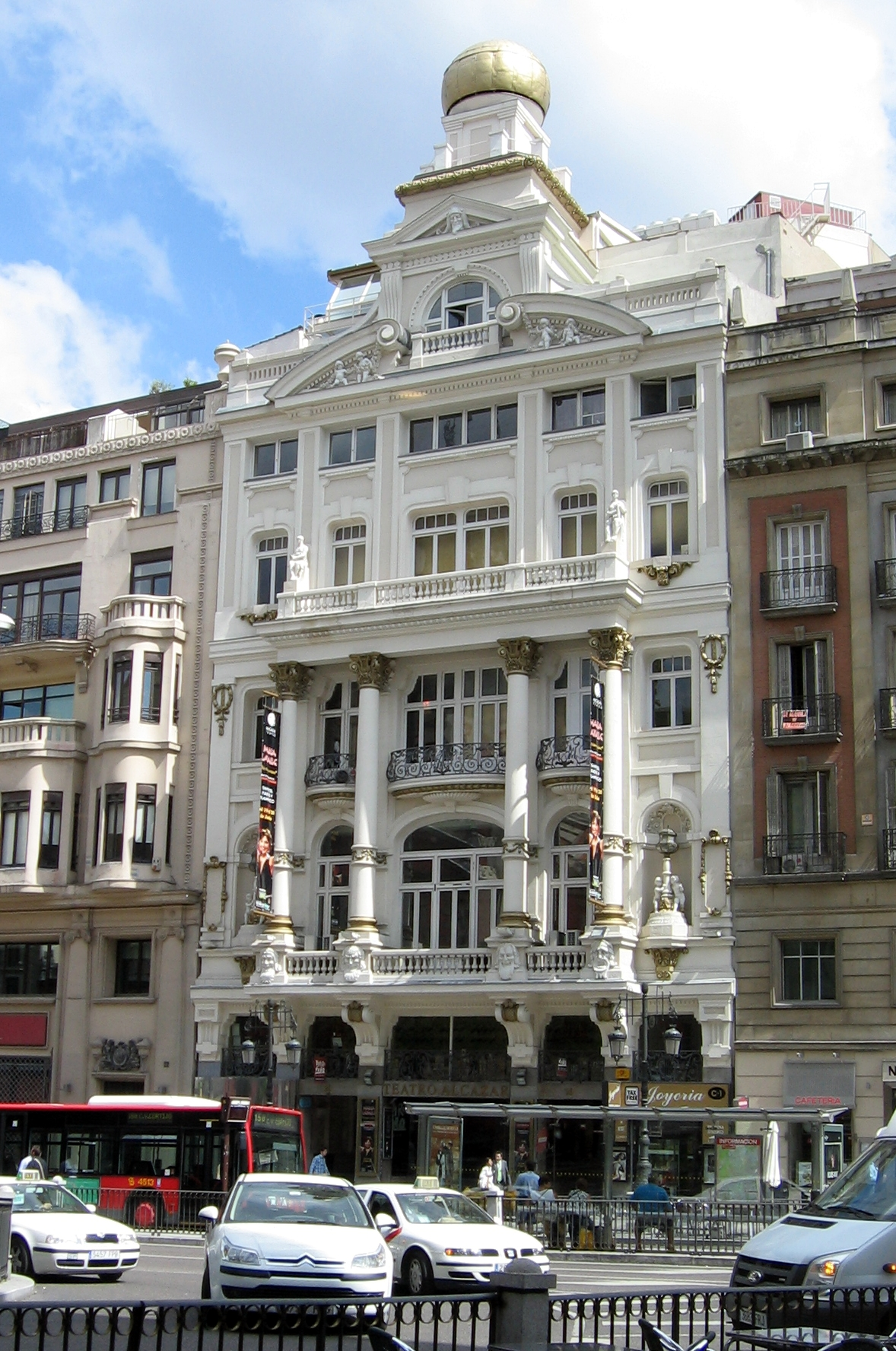
Teatro Alcázar

Teatro Alcázar is a theatre located in Madrid, Spain. Designed by Eduardo Sánchez Eznarriaga, it is located on the Calle de Alcala. It was founded in 1925, with the first performance occurring on 27 January with the operetta Madame Pompadour by Leo Fall.
