= Teatro Chueca =

Coordinates: 40.4325°N 3.6967°W

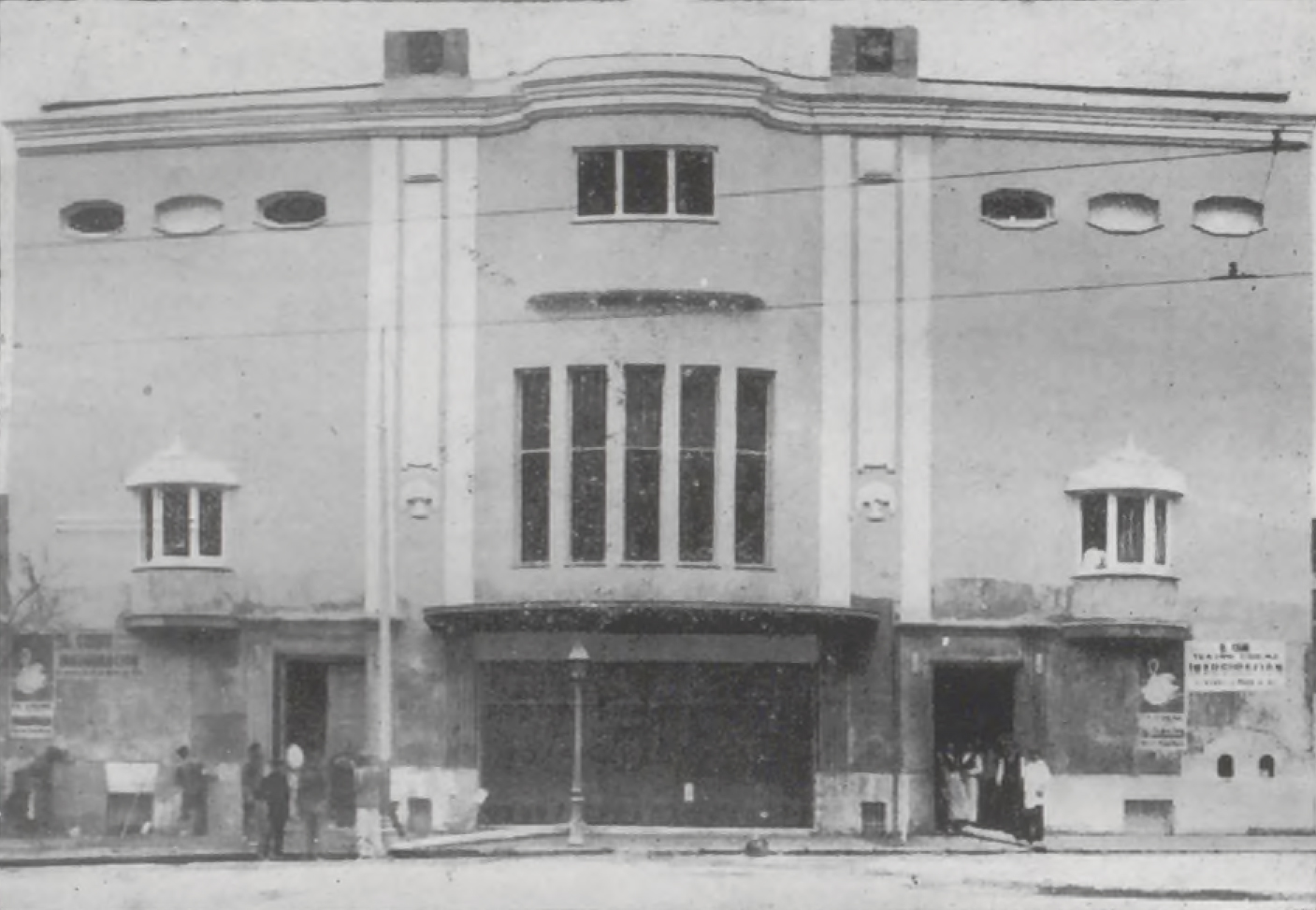
View of Teatro Chueca, then known as "Cinema de El Cisne".

Teatro Chueca was a theatre on the Plaza de Chamberí in Madrid, Spain. It was built in 1924.

== Notable plays ==
- El jardín de las caricias (1926)
- Para valiente el amor
- Viva Alcorcón que es mi pueblo (1933)
- La niña calamar (1935)
- El Hombre invisible (1936)
