= Brossa Espai Escènic =

Theatre in Barcelona

Coordinates: 41.386819°N 2.181236°E

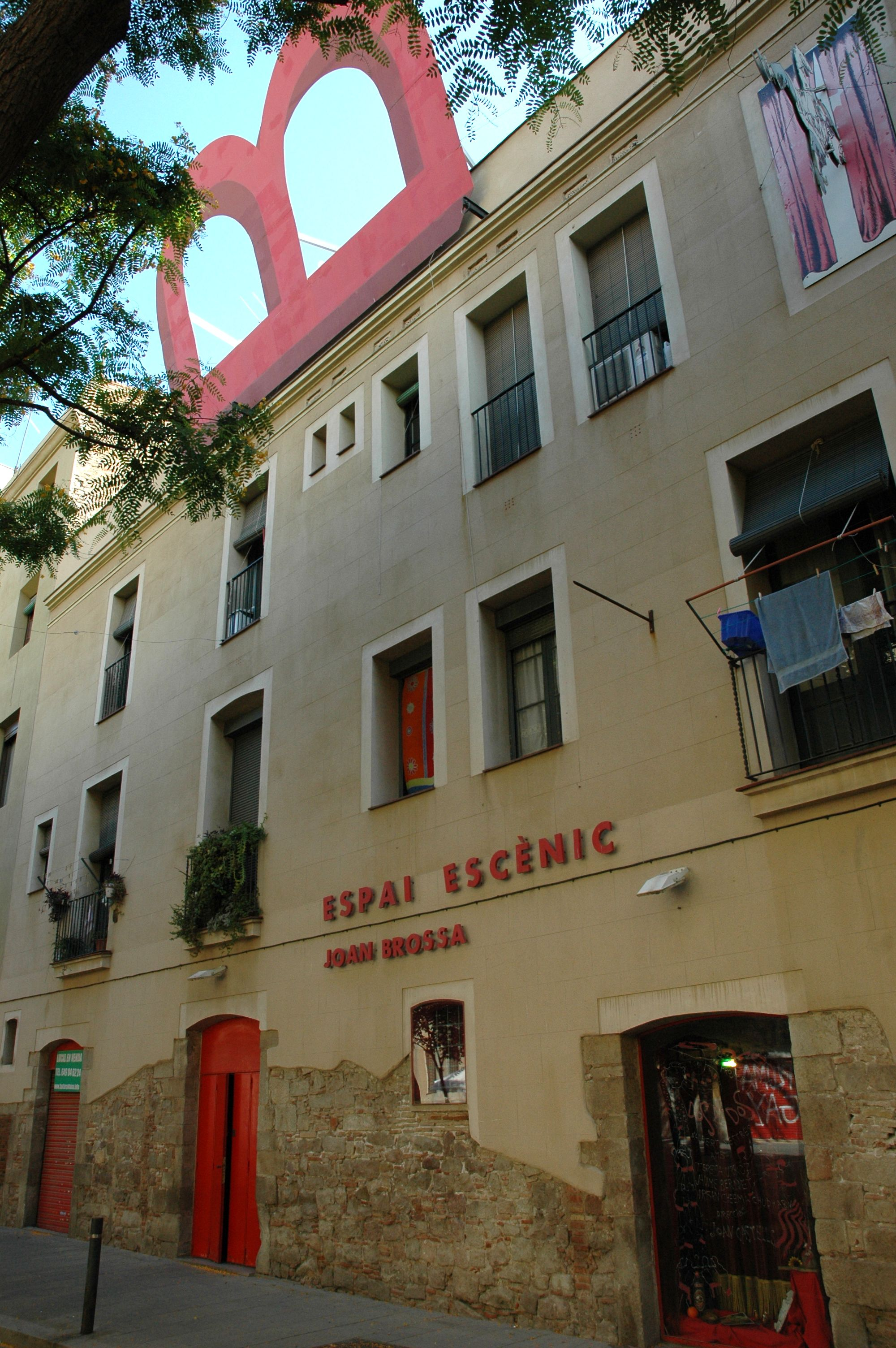
Brossa Espai Escènic

Brossa Espai Escènic (Brossa Scenic Space in Catalan) is a small theatre in Barcelona inaugurated in December 1997. It is intimately related to the creative universe of Joan Brossa i Cuervo and to the artistic and historic avant-garde activities and contemporary creation. Its founders and co-directors are actor and director Hermann Bonnín and magician Hausson.
