= Granada Mosque =

Mosque in Granada, Andalusia, Spain

- Spanish: Mezquita de Granada
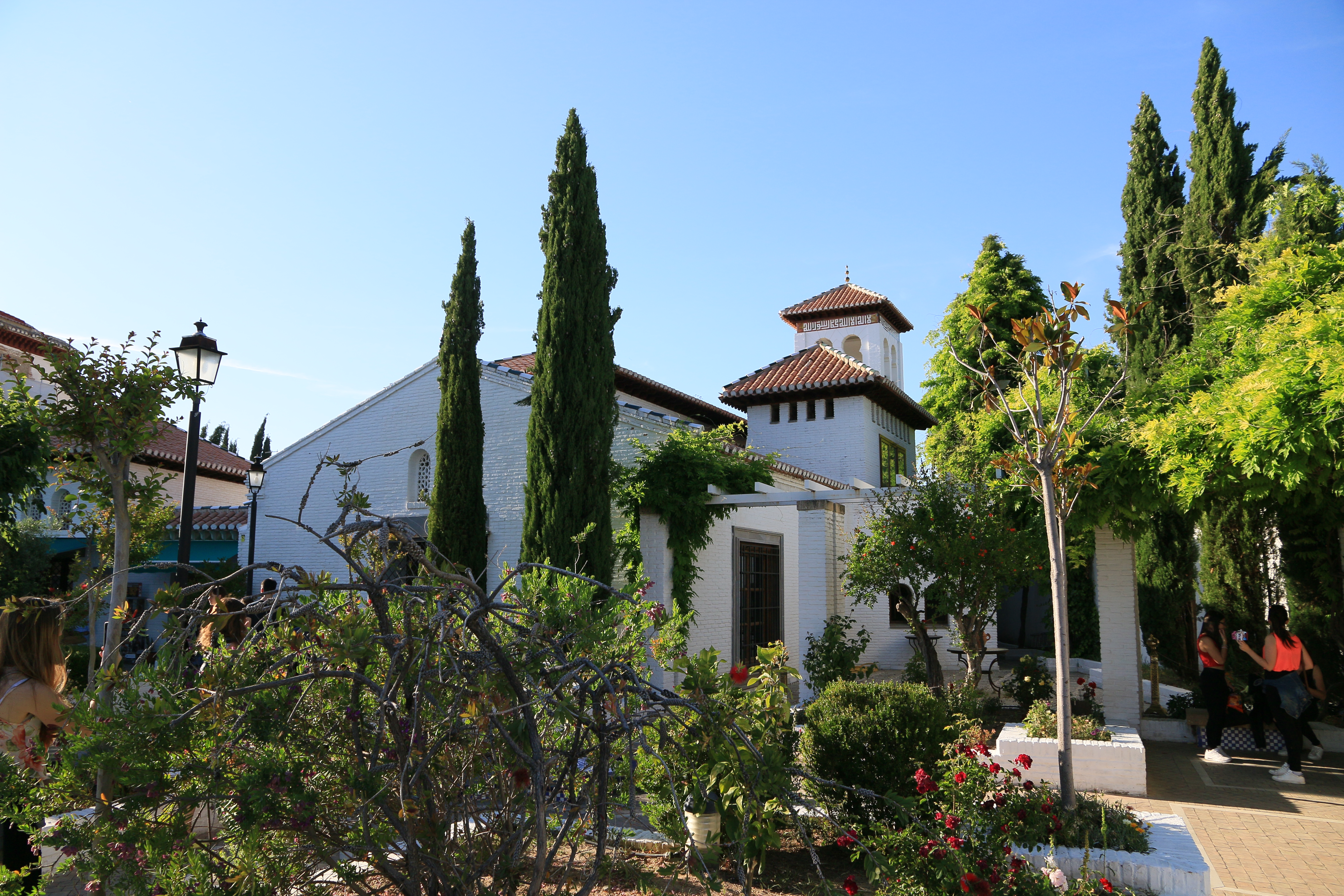
- The mosque in 2016

- Location of the mosque in Andalusia

Religion
- Affiliation: Sunni Islam
- Ecclesiastical or organisational status: Mosque
- Status: Active

Location
- Location: Granada, Andalusia
- Country: Spain
- Coordinates: 37°10′53.1″N 3°35′31.2″W

Architecture
- Type: Mosque architecture
- Established: c. 1980s (as a community)
- Groundbreaking: c. 1997
- Completed: 2003

Website
- mezquitadegranada.com (in Spanish)

The Granada Mosque (Spanish: Mezquita de Granada) is a Sunni Muslim mosque, located adjacent to the Plaza San Nicholas in the Albaicín district of Granada, Spain. Opened in 2003, it is the first mosque built in the city since 1492, when the conquest of Granada by Queen Isabella I of Castile and King Ferdinand II of Aragon concluded the reconquest of Spain by the Catholic Monarchs. Funded mainly by overseas donations and local support, the mosque was opened in 2003.

== History ==
The construction of the mosque was started by the local Muslim community in the 1980s. Fundraising, particularly from abroad, and with local support, took many years and construction did not begin until the late 1990s, with financial support from Sultan bin Muhammad Al-Qasimi, the Emir of Sharjah and King Hassan II of Morocco. The mosque opened in the summer of 2003. The mosque holds five daily prayers and Friday prayers. It also holds daily recitation and study of the Quran.

Over time, this mosque became the main mediator between local Muslim converts (such as Abdulhasib Castiñeira and Malik Abderrahmán Ruiz) and Muslim migrants, especially from North Africa. The influence of his Sufi teachings allowed for the spread of popular Islam. The number of converts in the mosque are at least tens of thousands.

== Architecture ==
The mosque building is designed with traditional Moorish Muslim motifs. The building complex consists of a prayer hall, a garden and an Islamic studies centre with a library, conference hall, exhibition area, bookshop and reception area.

== See also ==
- Islam in Spain
- List of mosques in Spain
