= Aljibe del Rey =

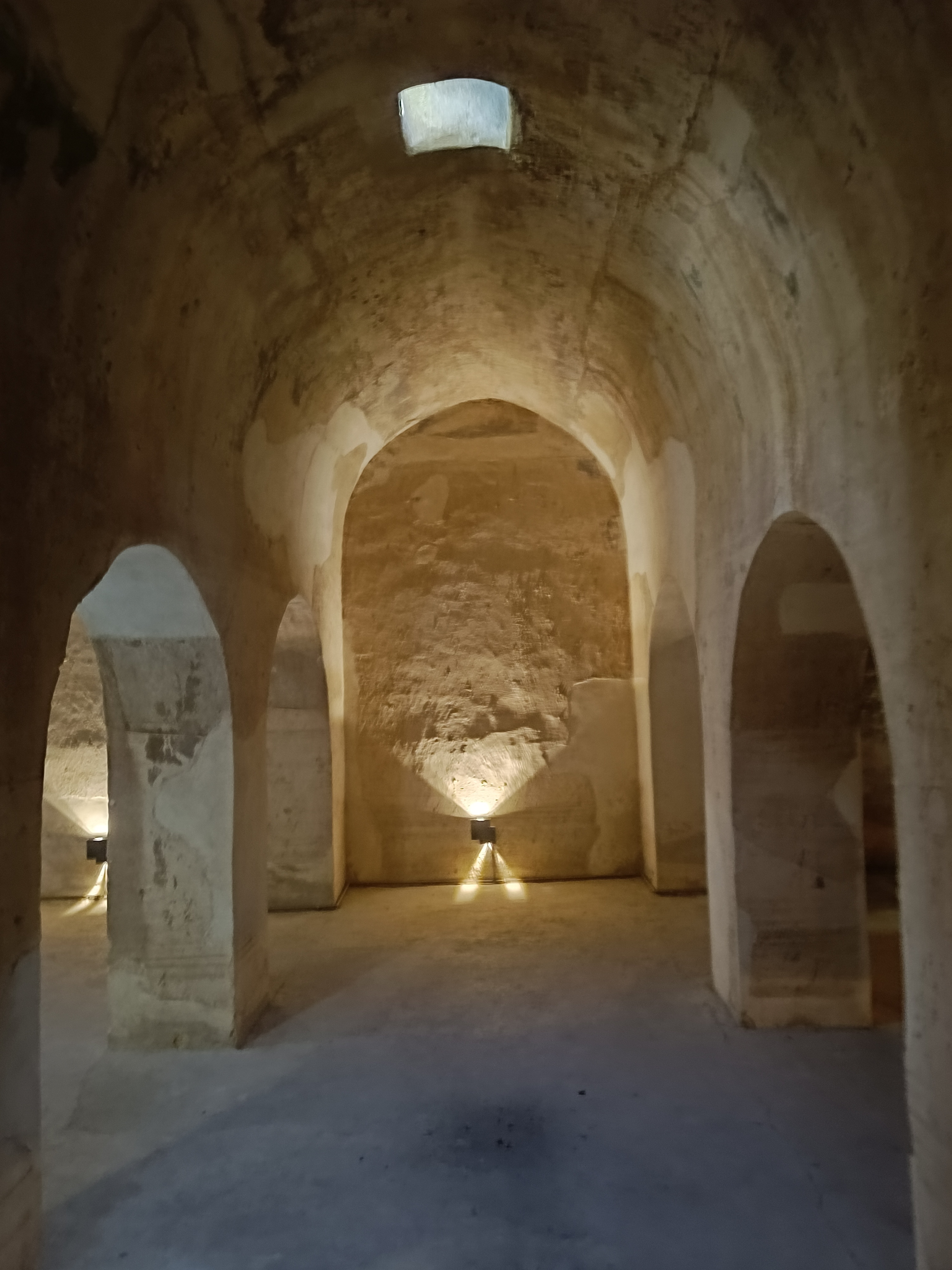

- Location within Andalusia
- 37.181656°N 3.595314°W
- Type: Cistern (aljibe)
- Location: Albaicín, Granada, Spain

History
- Built: 11th century

Site notes
- Governing body: AguaGranada Foundation

The Aljibe del Rey (the King's Cistern) in the Albaicín district in Granada, Spain is a cistern dating from the 10/11th centuries. Built by the Nasrid rulers to provide water to their palace complex, al-Qaṣaba al-Qadīma, it is the largest cistern in the district. The aljibe is now managed by the AguaGranada Foundation and the attached carmen (house) contains an interpretation centre. The aljibe is open daily.

== History ==
The Aljibe del Rey was built in the 11th century by the Zirid emir Badis ibn al-Mansur (r. 1038–1073) to supply the royal citadel and palace complex later known as al-Qaṣaba al-Qadīma ("the Old Citadel"). (Note: So-named by later Arabic sources to distinguish it from the newer Nasrid citadel, the Alhambra.) The cistern was known in Arabic sources as al-jubb al-qadīm ("the Old Well").

Water is drawn from the Fuente Grande (Great Spring) via the Aynadamar irrigation channel at Alfacar, a small town to the north of Granada. (Note: The author and Hispanist Ian Gibson suggests Fuente Grande, on the road between Víznar and Alfacar, as the site of the assassination of Federico García Lorca.) The cistern has a capacity of 300 cubic meters, making it the "biggest in the Albaicín". Its size permitted water sellers to extract water from the cistern, the only one where such commercial exploitation was allowed. Its construction predates the building of the Alhambra, to which the rulers of the Emirate of Granada relocated, although the cistern continued to supply the area and particularly the Dar al-Horra palace. (Note: The Dar al-Horra was the home of Aixa, mother of Muhammad XI, the last Nasrid ruler in Spain.) Eels and turtles were raised in the cistern to assist with keeping the water potable. They consumed algae and insects, and their movement through the water delayed stagnation.

The carmen and cistern was restored by the Ayuntamiento de Granada in 1988 and since 2008 has been managed by the AguaGranada Foundation, a charitable arm of the Emasagra water supply company. The centre was officially opened by Queen Sofía of Spain in 2009. The cistern can be viewed and the attached carmen includes an interpretation centre. The aljibe is open daily.

== Architecture and description ==
The cistern is constructed to a basilica plan, and forms a quadrangle with two portals to enable water to be drawn into the four underground vaulted chambers. The chambers also have a central opening in the roof, a feature unique to the Aljibe del Rey, which may have been to allow the supplementing of the water supply with rainwater. The whole structure is roughly 11 meters by 11 meters in size, and about four meters high. The external entrance, the alfiz, dates from the modern reconstruction in the 1990s.

The adjacent carmen has been restored and provides space for the interpretative centre as well as educational and administrative facilities. The adjoining orchard has been redeveloped as a garden.

== Gallery ==
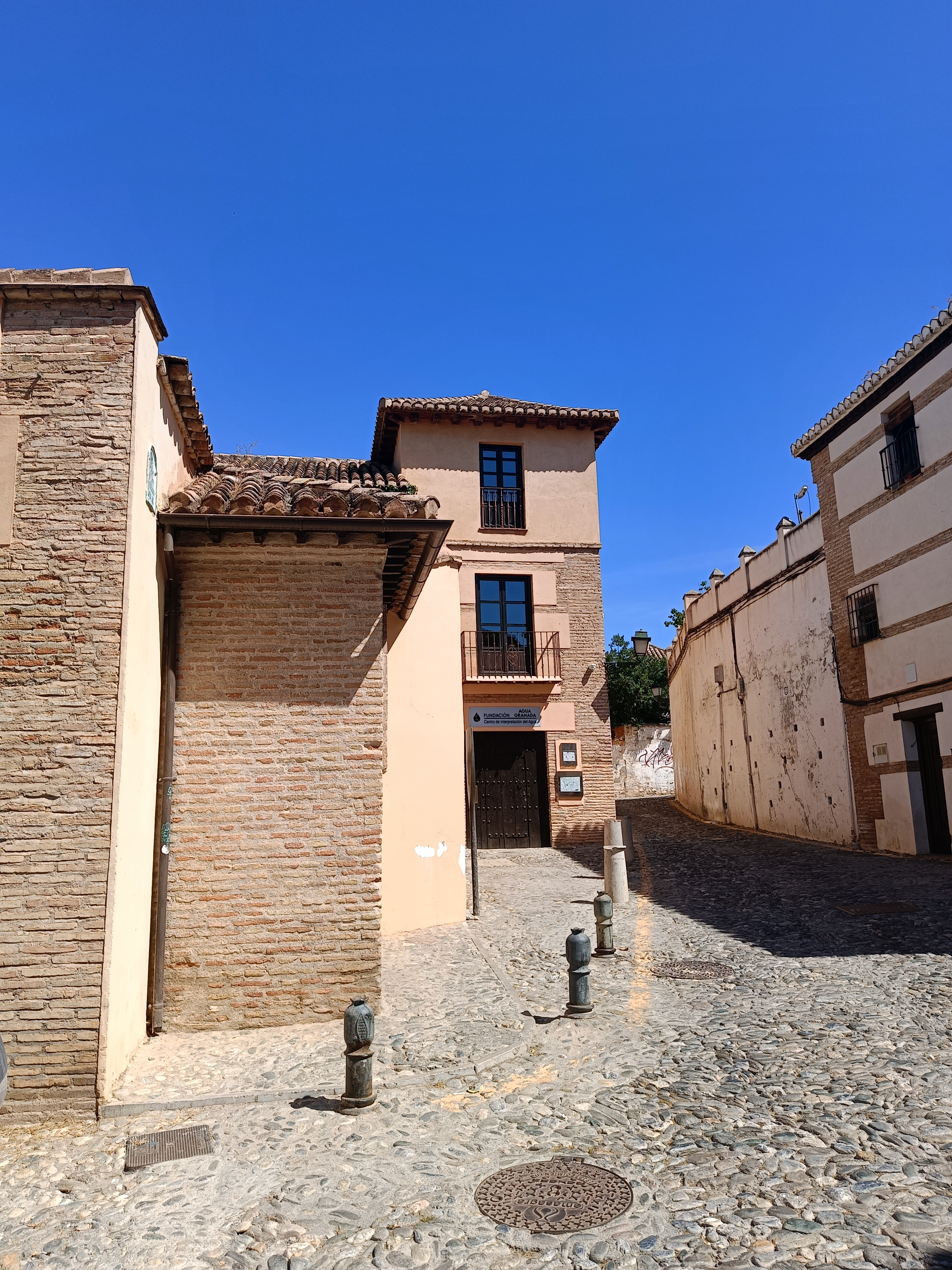
Exterior of the Aljibe del Rey

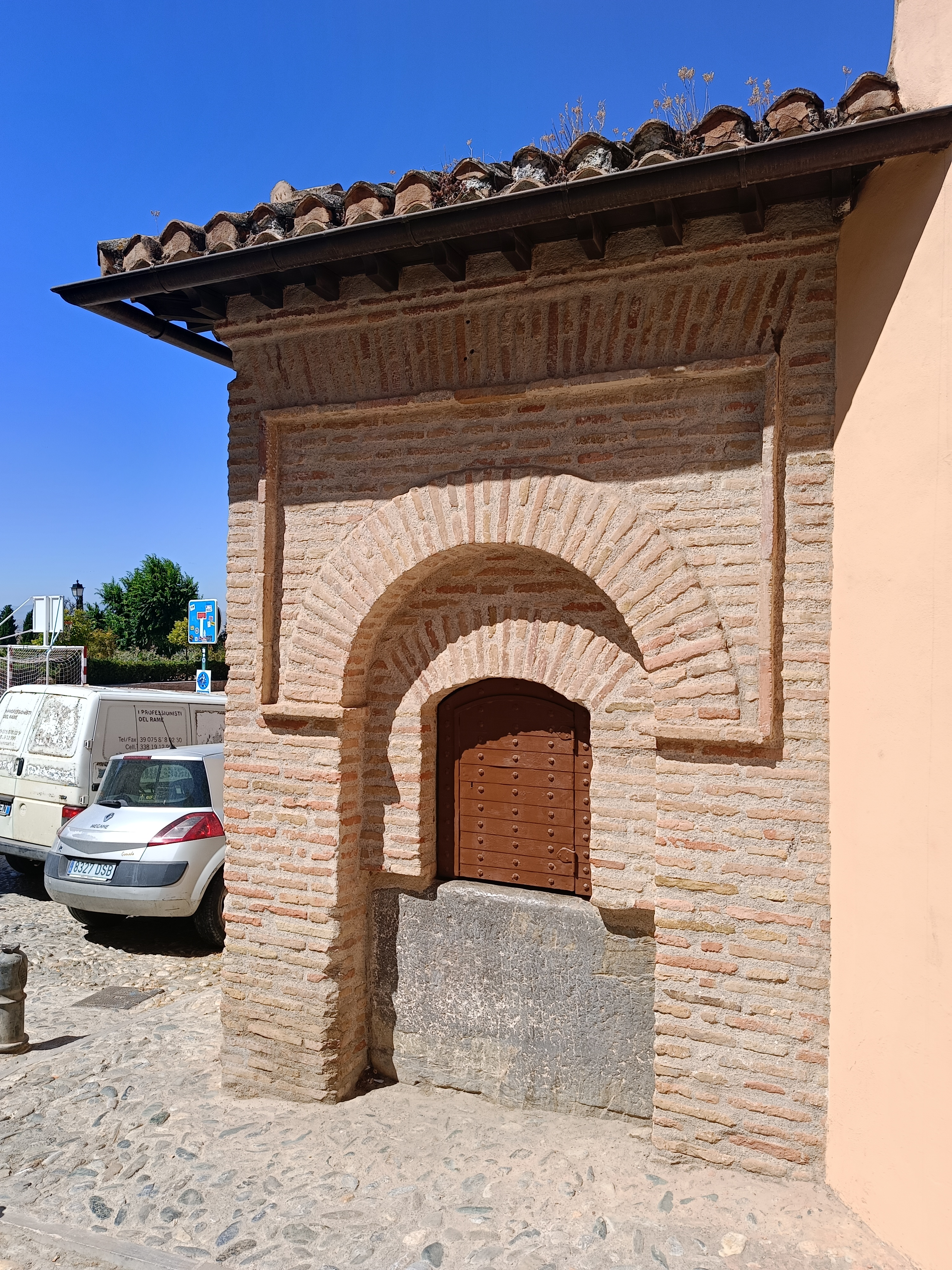
The alfiz, the exterior opening of the cistern

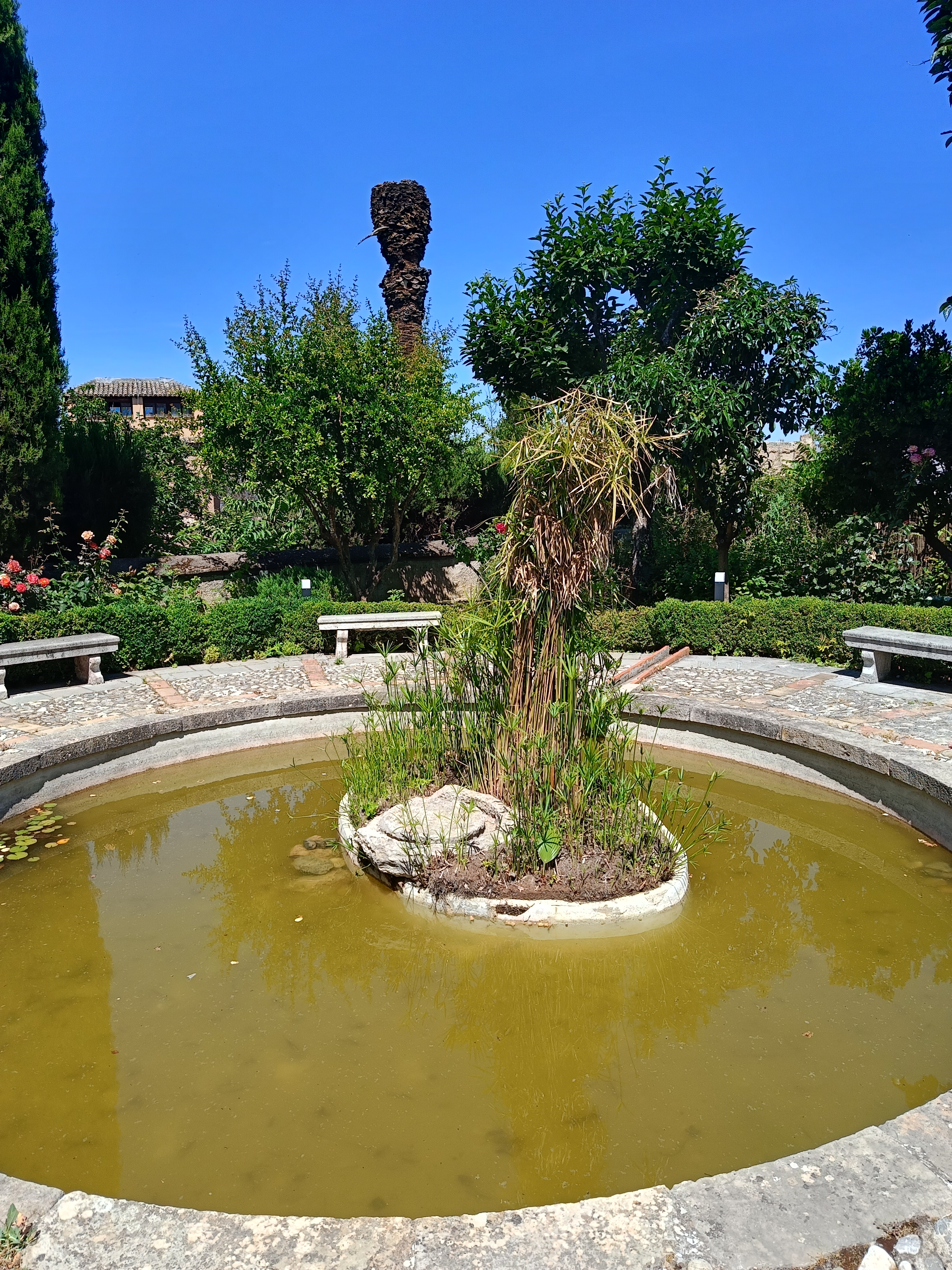
The carmen garden

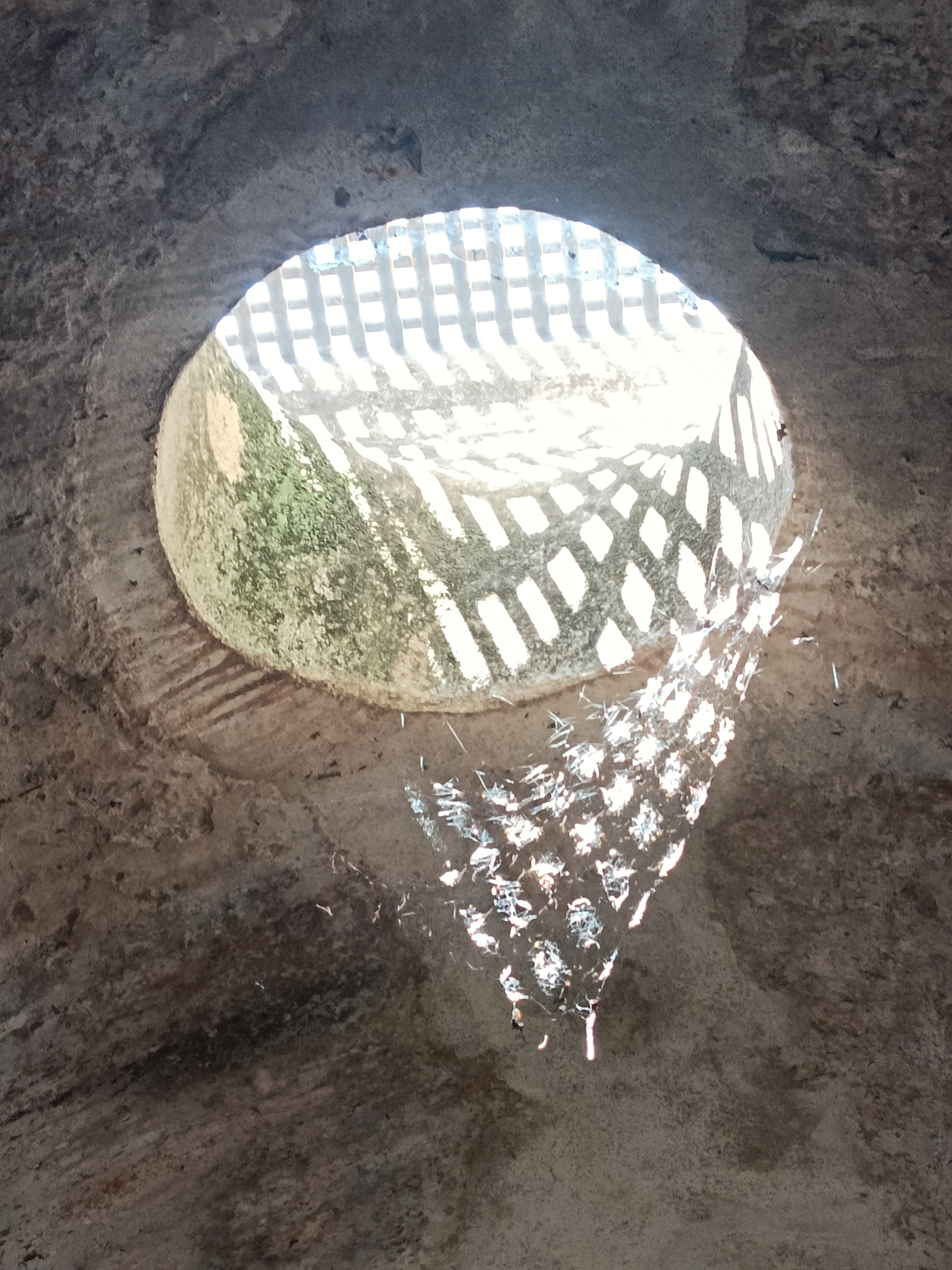
Opening to the cistern courtyard

== Sources ==
- AguaGranada, Foundation (2024). Carmen del Aljibe del Rey guide.
- Gibson, Ian (1983). The Assassination of Federico García Lorca. Harmondsworth, Middlesex: Penguin Books. ISBN 978-0-140-06473-5. OCLC 59146240.
