= Albaicín =

Historic neighborhood in Granada, Spain

Albaicín / Albayzín
- District
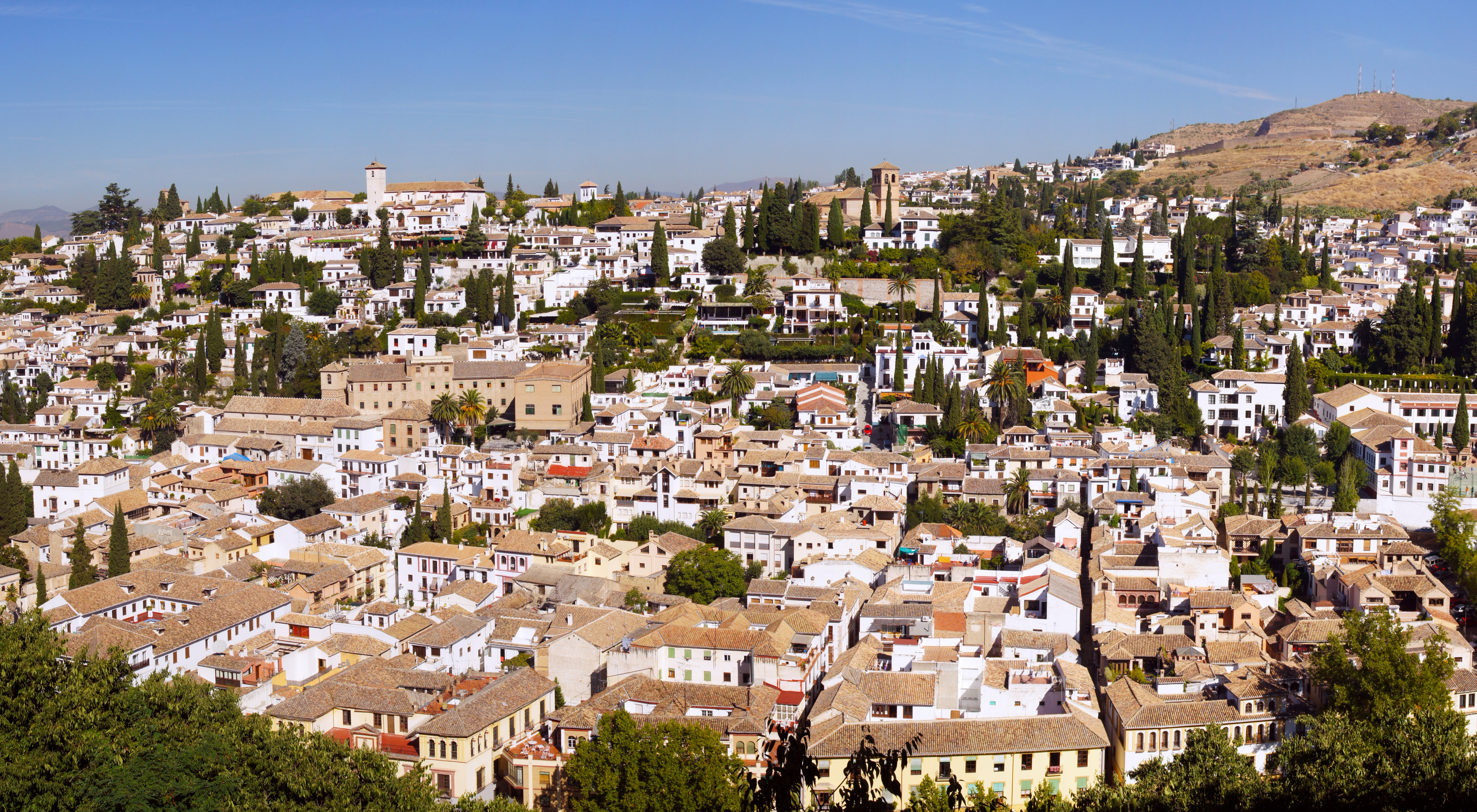

- Location within Spain
- Coordinates: 37°10′54″N 3°35′54″W
- Country: Spain
- Autonomous community: Andalusia
- Province: Granada
- Municipality: Granada

UNESCO World Heritage Site
- Part of: Alhambra, Generalife and Albayzín, Granada
- Criteria: Cultural: (i), (iii), (iv)
- Reference: 314bis-002
- Inscription: 1984 (8th Session)
- Extensions: 1994

The Albaicín (Spanish pronunciation: [alβajˈθin]), also spelled Albayzín (from Arabic: ٱلْبَيّازِينْ, romanized: al-Bayyāzīn), is a neighbourhood of Granada, Spain. It is centered around a hill on the north side of the Darro River which passes through the city. The neighbourhood is notable for its historic monuments and for largely retaining its medieval street plan dating back to the Nasrid period (13th to 15th centuries), although it nonetheless went through many physical and demographic changes after the end of the Reconquista in 1492. It was declared a World Heritage Site in 1994, as an extension of the historic site of the nearby Alhambra.

== Etymology ==
There are several theories as to the origin of the district's present name, which comes from Arabic al-Bayyāzīn (Arabic: ٱلْبَيّازِينْ). One theory is that al-Bayyāzīn was the Arabic plural noun denoting the inhabitants of the city of Baeza (called "Beatia" by the Romans) and that the name was given in reference to the refugees of that city who settled here during the Nasrid period. Another theory is that name comes from Arabic rabaḍ al-Bayyazīn, meaning "district/suburb of the falconers", which is supported by the fact that other neighborhoods with that name exist in other Spanish cities. Another hypothesis is that the name Albaicín derives from Arabic al-bāʾisīn (Arabic: البائسين, lit. 'the miserable [plural]'). A more likely possibility is that the word reflects the local pronunciation of the Arabic word "البياضين" or the whiteners, which may have been referring to those who work in whitewashing (lime washing of building exteriors). This must have been a profession in Andalusia. In some Arab countries, wall painting is still referred to as whitening (تبييض), regardless of the paint color.

== History ==
=== Early history ===
The region surrounding what today is Granada has been populated since at least 5500 BC. The most ancient ruins found in the area belong to an oppidum called Ilturir, founded by the Iberian Bastetani tribe around 650 BC. This settlement became later known as Iliberri or Iliberis. In 44 BC Iliberis became a Roman colony and in 27 BC it became a Roman municipium named Florentia Iliberritana ('Flourishing Iliberri'). The historical relation between present-day Granada and the Roman-era Iliberis has long been debated by scholars. (Note: During the Roman period, there was a township named Iliberris on the slopes of the Sierra de Elvira, where archaeological remains of Roman, Visigothic, and Arab origin have been found. The existence of a Roman settlement in the same place as Granada—or rather, the identification of Granada with Iliberis—has been a point of disagreement between historians of Granada since the tenth/sixteenth century. In the era of the Christian reconquest of southern Spain, the notion of such continuity allowed the conquerors to speak of a “restoration” of Christianity in Granada. Some experts argue strongly for continuity between the Roman city and Granada, as against the possibility (supported by the Arabic sources) that Granada was, in fact, a Muslim foundation: archaeological evidence has not been decisive either way.) (Note: The location of the town of Ilbīra was an issue of significance in Granada since the sixteenth century. The Catholic propaganda after 1492 pushed the identification of Ilbīra with Granada, and also with the Roman municipium Illiberis, where the first Church Council of Iberia took place in the early fourth century. If Granada was indeed Illiberis, the town was associated with one important early Christian centre and the right of the kings of Spain to take it over was providentially justified. However, there were enough mentions in the written sources, not only in Arabic, and even material evidence that suggested that Ilbīra, the first Islamic capital, was located near the village of Atarfe, about 15 kilometres north-west of Granada. The similarity in names suggested that Illiberis had been in Ilbīra and that Granada was a town founded by Muslims, ideas which implicitly supported the notion that Islam was an integral part of Spain rather than merely an enemy against which the nation had been built. After a debate four centuries long, M. Gómez Moreno compiled cases of the material evidence collected around the area of Atarfe by spoilers and even undertook an excavation in 1872 in which he found the mosque of the town, finally proving without any doubt that Ilbīra was located there. [p.490] (...) See Gómez Moreno, Medina Elvira for the description of the debate and of the different interventions. It is interesting to note that this solves the question of the location of Ilbīra, but not of Illiberis, at least in the time of the Council. Excavations in Granada have uncovered strong evidence that suggests that the Iberian and Roman towns of the same name were located there (e.g. Sotomayor Muro, “¿Donde estuvo Iliberri?”). It seems that at some point in late Antiquity, possibly before the Islamic conquest, the town of Illiberis was moved to the location where it later became Madīna Ilbīrah (e.g. Adroher et al., “Discusión”, pp. 202–206). To a certain extent, the debate still continues.) Modern archeological digs on the Albaicín hill have uncovered finds demonstrating the presence of a significant Roman town on that site. Little is known, however, about the history of the city in the period between the end of the Roman era and the 11th century.

The Umayyad conquest of Hispania, starting in 711 AD, brought large parts of the Iberian Peninsula under Muslim control, becoming known as al-Andalus. During the early Islamic period, under the rule of the Emirate and Caliphate of Cordoba (8th to 10th centuries), the area of the Albaicin was occupied by a small settlement and fortress (ḥiṣn) named Gharnāṭa, which had a mainly Jewish population and was thus also known as Gharnāṭat al-Yahūd ("Gharnāṭa of the Jews"). A larger settlement, Madīnat Ilbīra, was located further northwest, near present-day Atarfe.

=== Zirid period ===
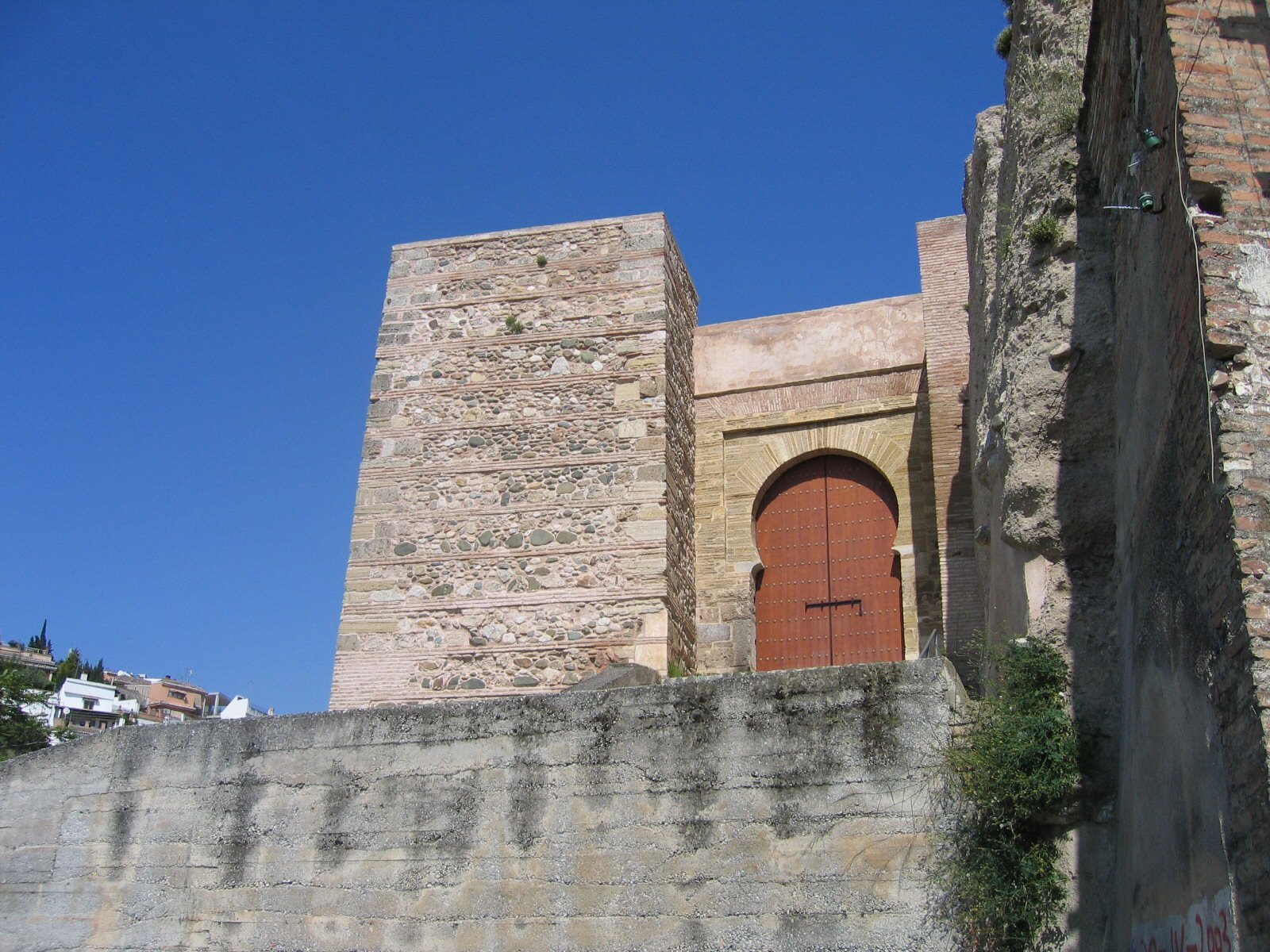
Puerta Monaita (formerly Bāb al-Unaydar), one of the 11th-century Zirid gates in the Albaicin

At the beginning of the 11th century, the area became dominated by the Zirids, a Sanhaja Berber group and offshoot of the Zirids who ruled parts of North Africa. When the Caliphate of Cordoba collapsed after 1009, the Zirid leader Zawi ben Ziri established an independent kingdom for himself, the Taifa of Granada. Rather than settling at Madīnat Ilbīra, Zawi ben Ziri settled in the more defensible position of Gharnāṭa (Granada) instead. In a short time this town was transformed into one of the most important cities of al-Andalus.

The Zirids built their citadel and palace, known as the al-Qaṣaba al-Qadīma ("Old Citadel"), on the hill now occupied by the Albaicín neighborhood. It was connected to two smaller fortresses on the Sabika hill (site of the future Alhambra) and Mauror hill to the south. The city around it grew during the 11th century to include the Albaicín, the Sabika, the Mauror, and a part of the surrounding plains. The city was fortified with walls encompassing an area of approximately 75 hectares. The northern part of these walls, near the Albaicin citadel, have survived to the present day, along with one of its main gates, the Bāb al-Unaydar (now called Puerta Monaita in Spanish). Another smaller gate, Bāb al-Ziyāda (now known as Arco de las Pesas or Puerta Nueva) is located further east along the same wall.

The city and its residences were supplied with water through an extensive hydraulic system of underground cisterns and pipes. The Zirid palace was located near the largest medieval cistern of the Albaicin, known in Arabic as al-Jubb al-Qadīm ("the Old Cistern") and in Spanish today as the Aljibe del Rey ("Cistern of the King"), which had a capacity of 300 cubic metres. A now-ruined sluice gate called Bāb al-Difāf ("Gate of the Tambourines") was built across the Darro River and could be closed in order to retain water if needed. The nearby Bañuelo, a former hammam (bathhouse), also likely dates from this period, as does the former minaret of a mosque that is now part of the Church of San José.

=== Nasrid period ===
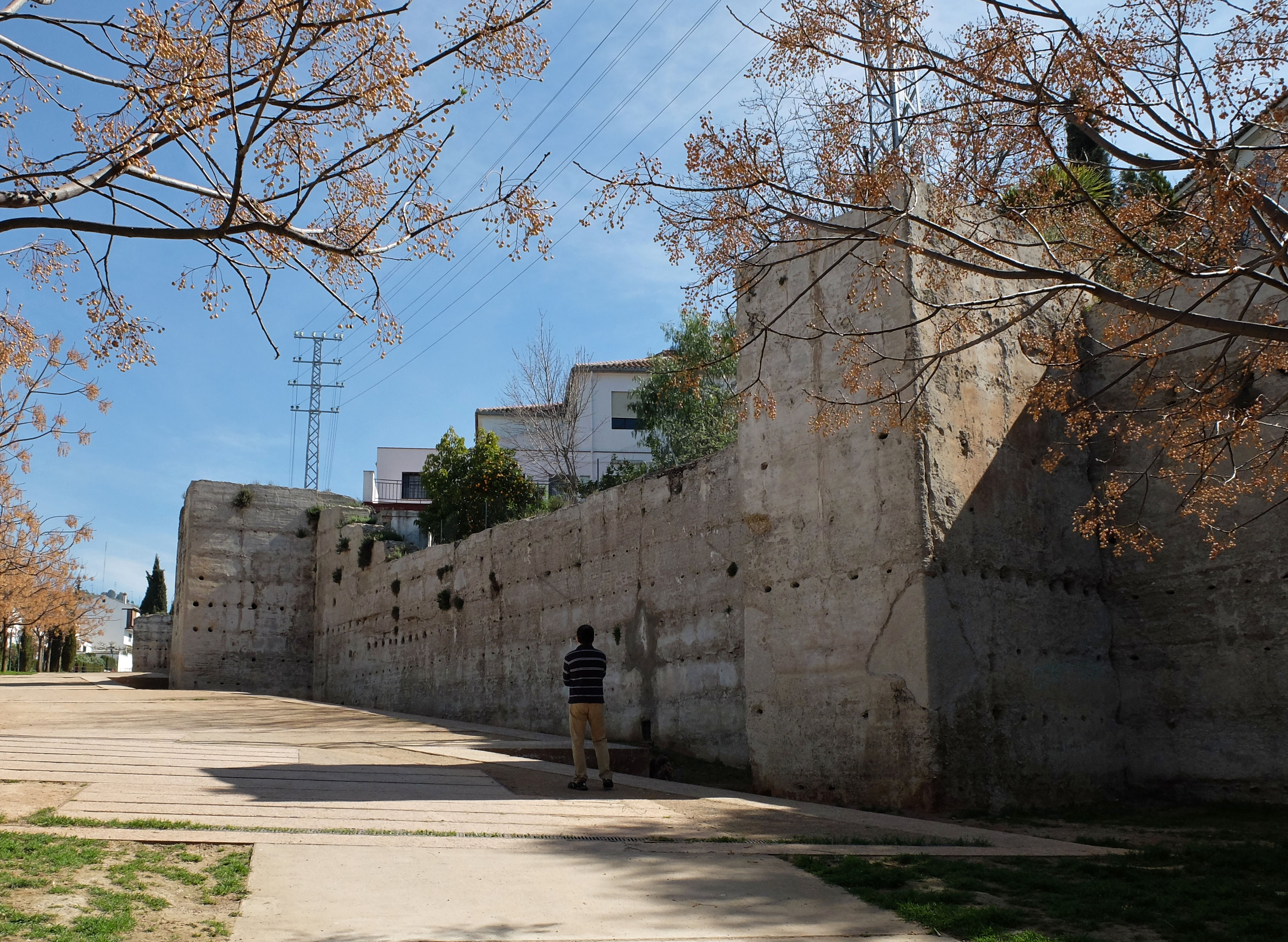
Remains of the 14th-century Nasrid walls of the Albaicín

In the 13th century, following the rise and fall of other Muslim dynasties and the military advances of the Christian kingdoms of Castile and Aragon, Ibn al-Ahmar (Muhammad I) established what became the last and longest reigning Muslim dynasty in the Iberian peninsula, the Nasrids, who ruled the Emirate of Granada. However, when Ibn Al-Ahmar established himself in the city he moved the royal palace from the old Zirid citadel on the Albaicín hill to the Sabika hill further south, beginning construction on what became the present Alhambra, a fortified palace complex that still dominates the city today.

The population of the city and the wider Nasrid emirate was swelled by Muslim refugees from the territories newly conquered by Castile and Aragon, resulting in a small yet densely populated territory which was more uniformly Muslim and Arabic-speaking than before. Granada itself expanded and new neighbourhoods grew around the Albaicín.

A new set of walls was constructed further north of the Albaicín during the 13th–14th centuries, with Bab Ilbirah (present-day Puerta de Elvira) as its western entrance. Among the major monuments built in the Albaicín during this period are the Maristan (hospital), built in 1365–1367 (later demolished in 1843) and the Great Mosque (congregational mosque) of the Albaicín, dating from the 13th century. (Note: This mosque was converted in 1499 into the Church of San Salvador. Only the mosque's sahn (courtyard) is preserved in the present-day building.) During this time the commercial heart of the district was what is now known as Panaderos Street (Calle Panaderos). This street ran between the gate called Bab al-Ziyada to the west and the Great Mosque of the Albaicín to the east. Next to Bab al-Ziyada was a public square called Raḥbat al-Ziyāda ("Enlargement Square") also existed, later known in Spanish as El Ensanche ("the Enlargement") and now as Plaza Larga.

=== Spanish period ===
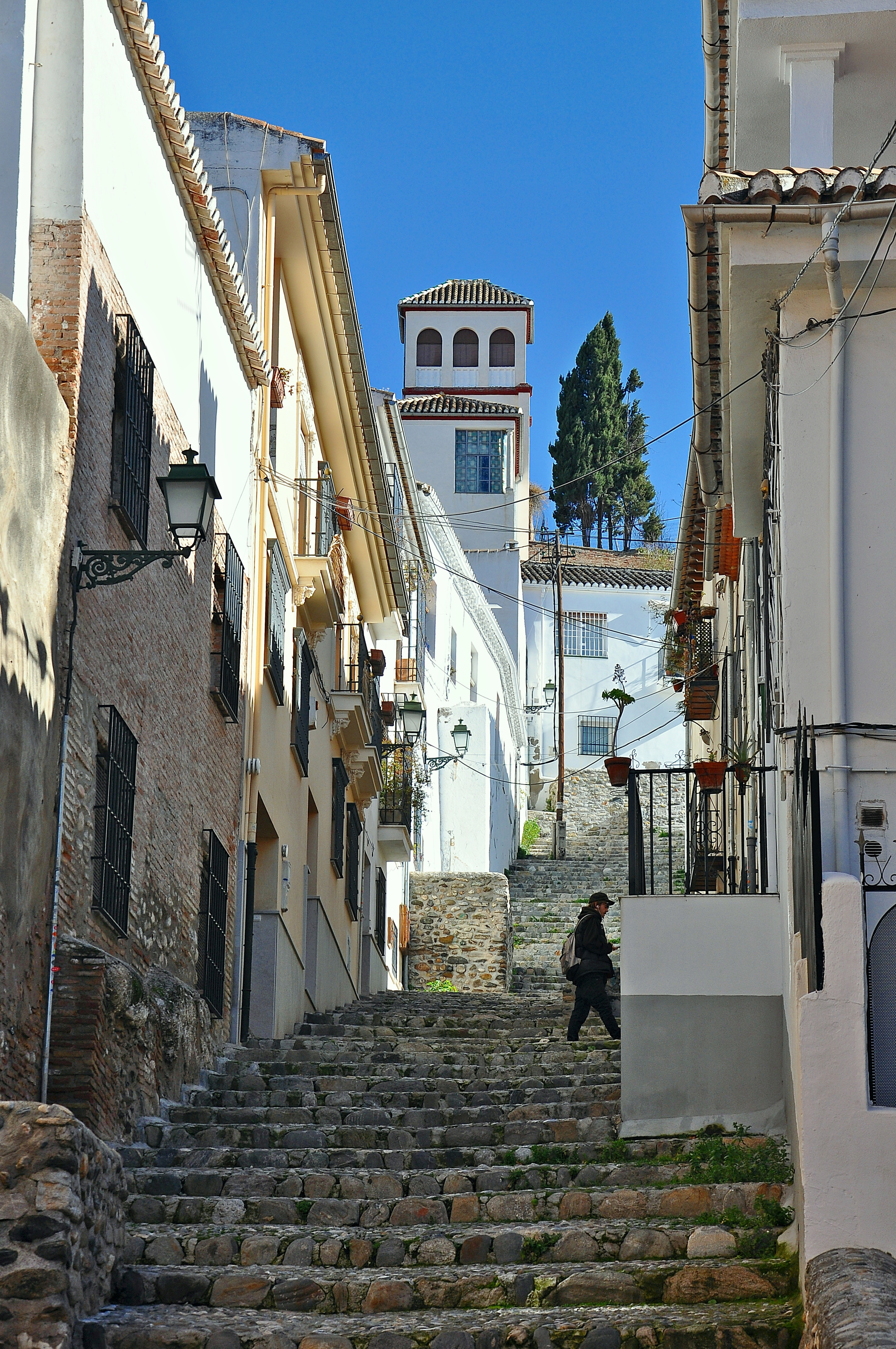
A typical street in the Albaicín

In 1492, after years of military campaigns, Granada fell under the control of the Spanish monarchs Ferdinand and Isabella, completing the Christian conquest of Muslim al-Andalus. Muslims were initially granted protections and rights according to the terms of the surrender, but these rights were soon undermined. In December 1499, the Albaicín was the starting point of a Muslim rebellion throughout Granada, triggered by the forced conversion of the Muslim population to Christianity, who then became known as 'Moriscos'. After the Christian conquest, much of the Morisco population of the city was displaced to the Albaicin, where they were joined in the 16th century by emigrants from the surrounding hinterlands of the Vega valley, the Alpujarras, and the Lecrín valley. Mosques were replaced with new parish churches, particularly after 1501. These new churches were often built in a mix of Mudéjar and Renaissance styles. New civic institutions were also built in the area, such as the Royal Chancellery (Real Chancillería), which overlooks Plaza Nueva, a public square expanded during the 16th century.

The Morisco rebellion of 1568, however, resulted in a mass expulsion of Moriscos from the city and left much of neighbourhood abandoned. The old Morisco properties were taken over by the remaining Christian residents, but the neighbourhood continued to have low urban density until the 19th century. It was only towards the end of the 19th century, when the present-day Gran Vía de Colón and its surroundings were created between 1895 and 1908, that many of the inhabitants in the centre of the city were forced to relocate to the Albaicin and the neighbourhood increased in density. Many of the former spacious courtyard homes were subdivided into smaller plots to accommodate multiple families, or rooms from adjacent houses were purchased and joined to expand available living spaces. These crowded conditions continued until the 1970s, when the standard of living increased and some affluent families began to return to the neighbourhood.

In 1994, the Albaicín was declared a World Heritage Site by UNESCO as an extension of the monuments of the Alhambra and the Generalife.

== Historic houses (carmens) ==
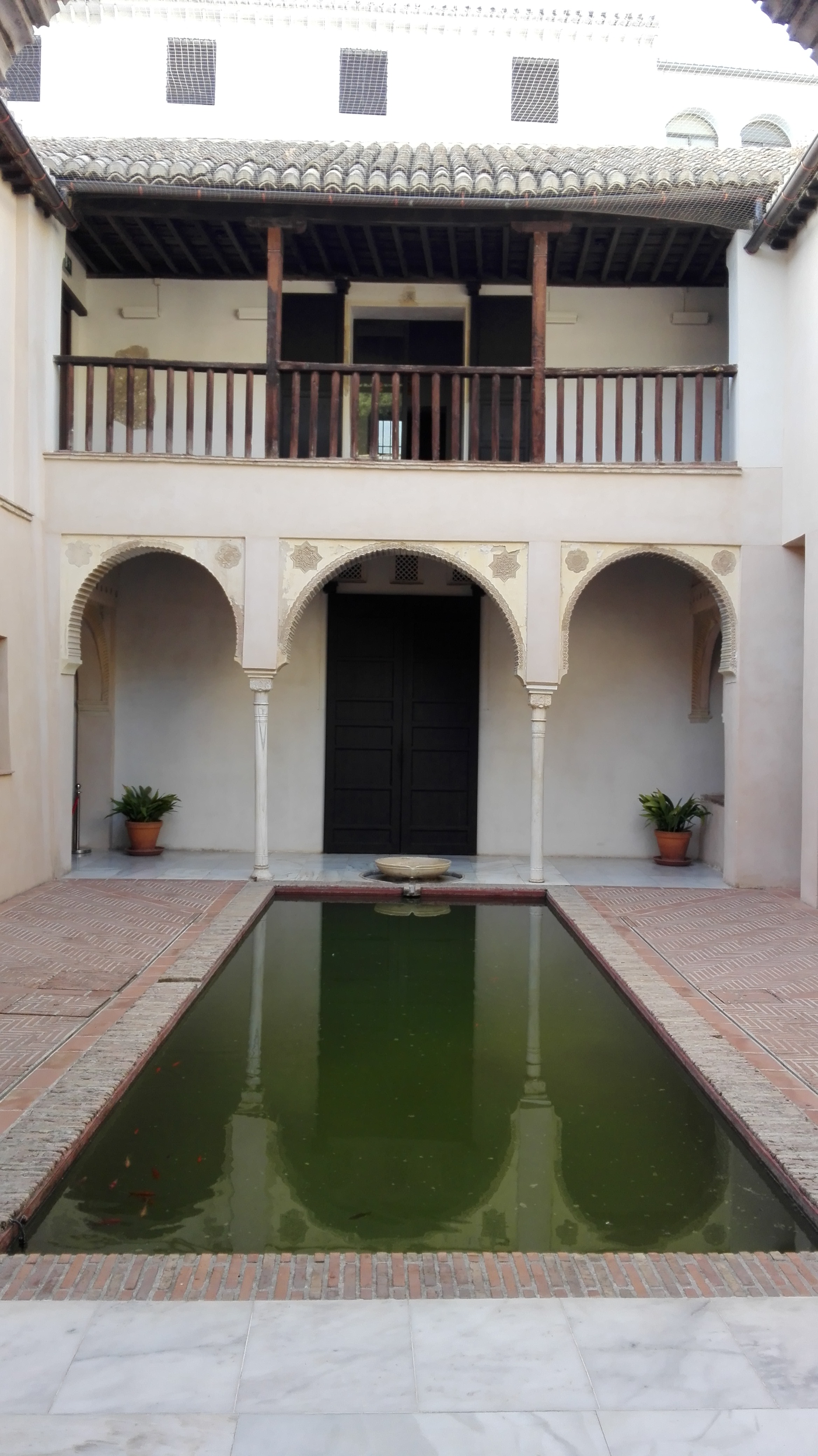
Casa de Zafra, a traditional house in the Albaicín built in the 14th–15th centuries

The traditional type of house is the carmen, consisting of a freestanding house with typically whitewashed walls and including a small orchard or garden. The Spanish term carmen is derived from the Arabic word karm (meaning 'vineyard'). This term originally referred to a type of "periurban" house built on the hillsides on the outskirts of the city. Following the Morisco rebellion of 1568 much of the Morisco population of the city was expelled, which left many of the houses in the Albaicin empty. The remaining Christian residents then added the abandoned properties to their own and converted them into orchards and gardens, thus importing the periurban house type into this central neighbourhood of the city. All houses were provided with water through a network of pipes which distributed water from the many cisterns in the area. At least twenty underground cisterns still exist in the neighbourhood today.

Among the oldest and most important preserved historic houses in the neighbourhood are the Casa de Zafra and the Dar al-Horra, both dating from the Nasrid period. The Casa de Zafra was built in the 14th to 15th century and is named after Hernando de Zafra, the Secretary of Ferdinand and Isabella. The Dar al-Horra was a Nasrid palace built in the 15th century. Both mansions include large rectangular courtyards oriented in a north–south direction. The main rooms of the houses were located behind porticos on the north and south sides of the courtyard. Traditionally, the northern rooms were larger, allowing them to take advantage of the northern winds and the midday sun.

Traditional house architecture evolved over the 15th and 16th centuries. Previously, the ground floors of residences were more important and more heavily decorated. Over this period, however, it became more common to build an upper story and this upper story often became more richly decorated than the ground floor. The "doubling" of rooms on both the ground and upper floors likely reflected their seasonal use: the upper floors, which were warmer, were used in colder months while the ground floors were used in warmer months. In the 16th century, Castilian Gothic and Renaissance motifs also began to appear among the decorative motifs and the upper floor galleries were extended around all four sides of the courtyard (rather than just the north and south sides).

== Places of interest ==
In the Albaicín there are numerous monuments from different periods, mainly the Nasrid period and the Renaissance.

=== Museums ===
- Archaeological and Ethnographic Museum of Granada: Provincial archeological museum with objects from many historical periods, founded in 1879 and housed in the 16th-century Castril Palace.
- Carmen de Los Geranios: Casa Museo De Max Moreau - a house museum dedicated to the life and work of the Belgian painter Max Moreau.
- Palacio de los Olvidados: A 16th century house and museum displaying torture instruments of the Spanish Inquisition.

=== City walls and gates ===
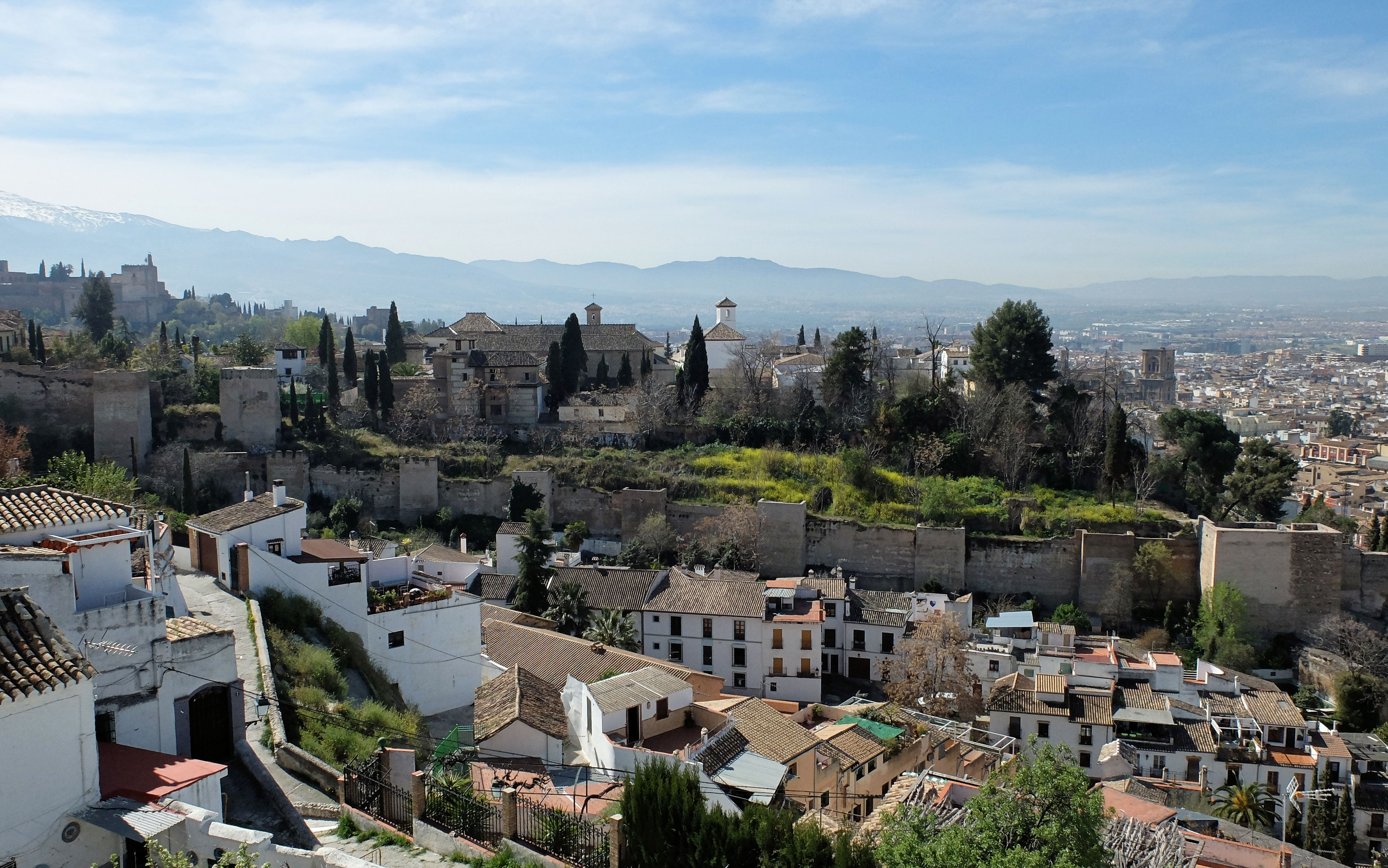
View towards the 11th-century Zirid walls of the Albaicin, with the bastion of the Puerta Monaita on the far right

- City walls: A section of the 11th-century Zirid city walls runs along the high ridge of the Albaicin today, from Puerta de Elvira in the west to Puerta Nueva in the east. These walls protected the former Zirid palace and citadel, the al-Qaṣaba al-Qadīma. A wide view of these walls can be seen from the Mirador de San Cristobal, among other vantage points. Further north, a long section of the 14th-century Nasrid extension of the walls runs from Carretera de Murcia in the west to the slopes above the Sacromonte area in the east. The highest point of these walls is marked by the Hermitage of San Miguel Alto, a church built on the site of a former Nasrid fortification tower (known as Burj al-Zeitun, "Tower of the Olive Tree").
- Puerta de Elvira: Medieval gate at the beginning of Calle Elvira, formerly known as Bāb Ilbīra in Arabic. It was originally part of the 11th-century Zirid walls, but in the 14th century it was rebuilt into a heavily fortified structure in order to be incorporated into the new Nasrid extension of the walls. Only a part of the gate remains today. A large Muslim cemetery, known as the Ibn Malik Cemetery, formerly existed outside this gate. The present-day Royal Hospital (Hospital Real) stands over a part of this former cemetery.
- Puerta Monaita: A gate in the 11th-century city walls, formerly known as Bāb al-Unaydar.
- Puerta Nueva (or Arco de las Pesas): A gate in the 11th-century walls, formerly known as Bāb al-Ziyāda.
- Puerta de Fajalauza: Gate in Cuesta de San Gregorio Alto, one of the few remaining gates of the 14th-century city walls.
- Puente del Cadí (or Puerta de los Tableros): Remains of a gate along the Darro River, between the Albaicin hill and what is now the Alcazaba of the Alhambra. All that remains today is one of the gate's hexagonal towers and fragments of its former horseshoe archway. It acted as a sluice gate which could be opened or closed to control the flow of the river. It was known in Arabic as Bāb al-Difāf ("Gate of the Tambourines"), but is known today in Spanish as the Puente del Cadí ("Bridge of the Qadi") or the Puerta de los Tableros ("Gate of the Boards"). This gate was also part of the fortification connecting the Zirid citadel on the Albaicín with the former Zirid fortress on the Sabika hill. It formed part of a coracha (from Arabic qawraja), which allowed soldiers from the fortress on the Sabika to access the river and bring back water even during times of siege.

=== Islamic-era monuments ===
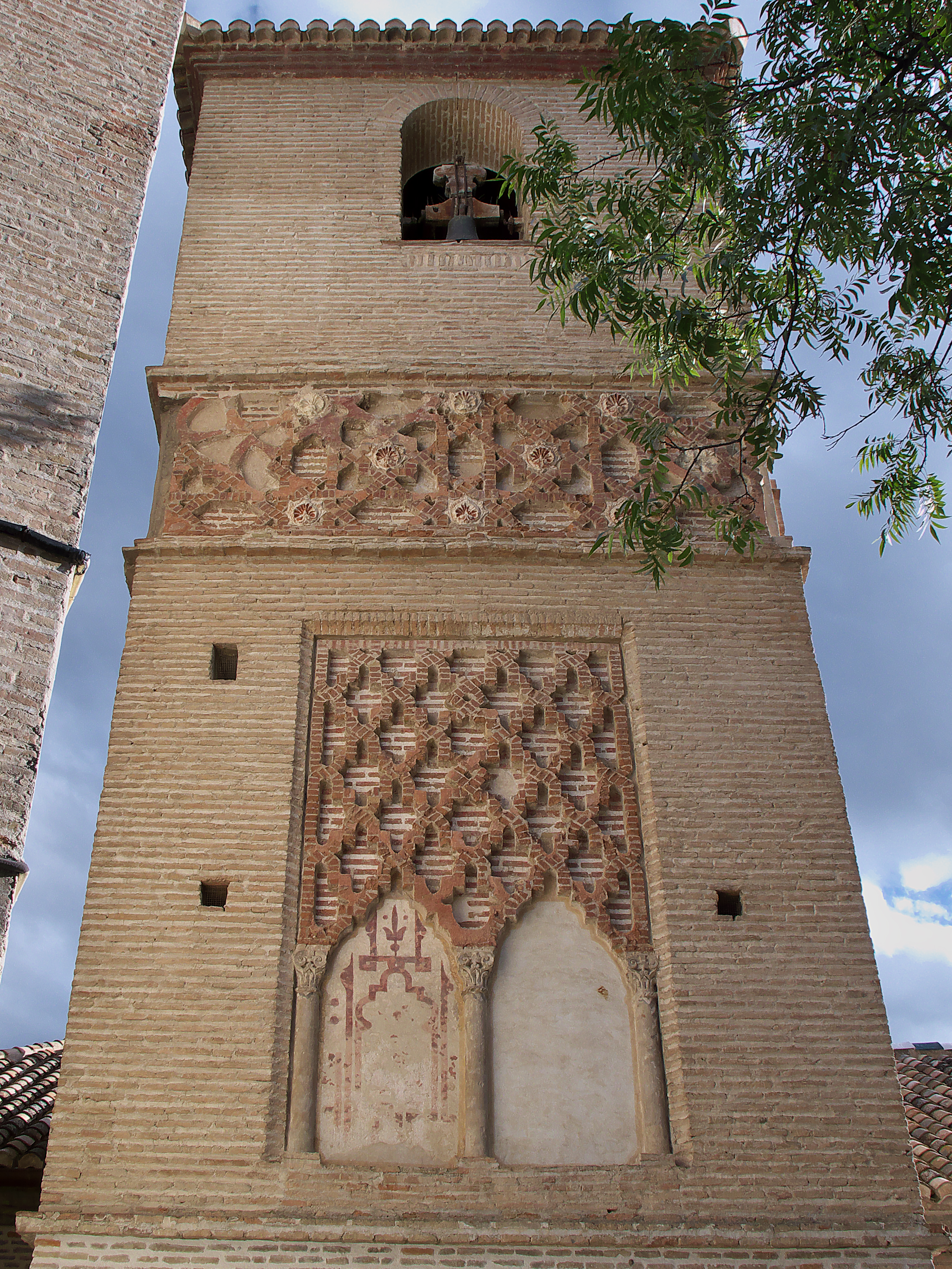
Almohad minaret (13th century) attached to the Church of San Juan de los Reyes

- El Bañuelo: An 11th or 12th-century hammam (bathhouse), originally known as the Hammam al-Yawza, now open to visitors as a historic monument.
- Minaret of San José: The minaret of the al-Murābiṭīn Mosque ("Mosque of the Hermits" or "Mosque of the Almoravids"), now incorporated with the Church of San José. The mosque is believed to have been built in the 11th century, during the Zirid period.
- Remains of the Great Mosque of the Albaicin: What remains of the former Great Mosque of the Albaicin (Masjid al-Jāmiʿ al-Bayyāzīn) is incorporated into the present Church of El Salvador. The mosque was built in the 13th century by the Almohads. Only its courtyard (sahn), with arcades of horseshoe arches, has been preserved today as part of the church. The mosque originally covered a total area measuring 42.4 by 32.2 metres. The mosque's prayer hall, now disappeared, had a hypostyle form similar to the city's larger Great Mosque (on the site of the current Cathedral). It had nine aisles divided by rows of arches supported by 86 marble columns, with the central aisle being wider than the others. The courtyard was planted with lemon trees. Opposite the mosque there originally stood an Islamic primary school and a khan (urban caravanserai).
- Minaret of the al-Tā'ibīn Mosque (San Juan de los Reyes): The al-Tā'ibīn Mosque ("Mosque of the Converts") was a former mosque built by the Almohads in the 13th century. Its minaret is now incorporated into the present Church of San Juan de los Reyes. It features some brickwork decoration with sebka motifs, similar to the larger Giralda in Seville.

=== Churches ===
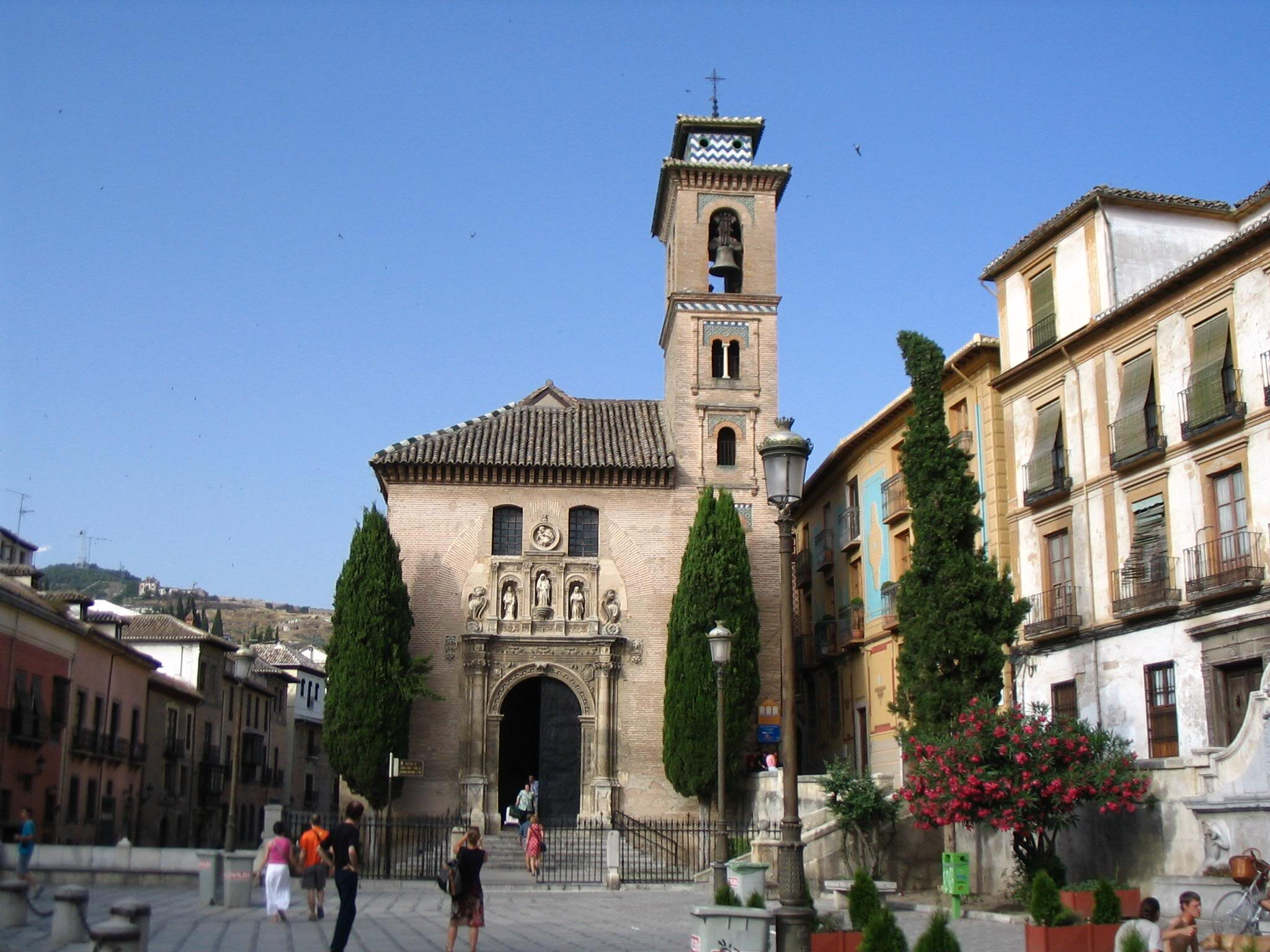
Church of Santa Ana (16th century)

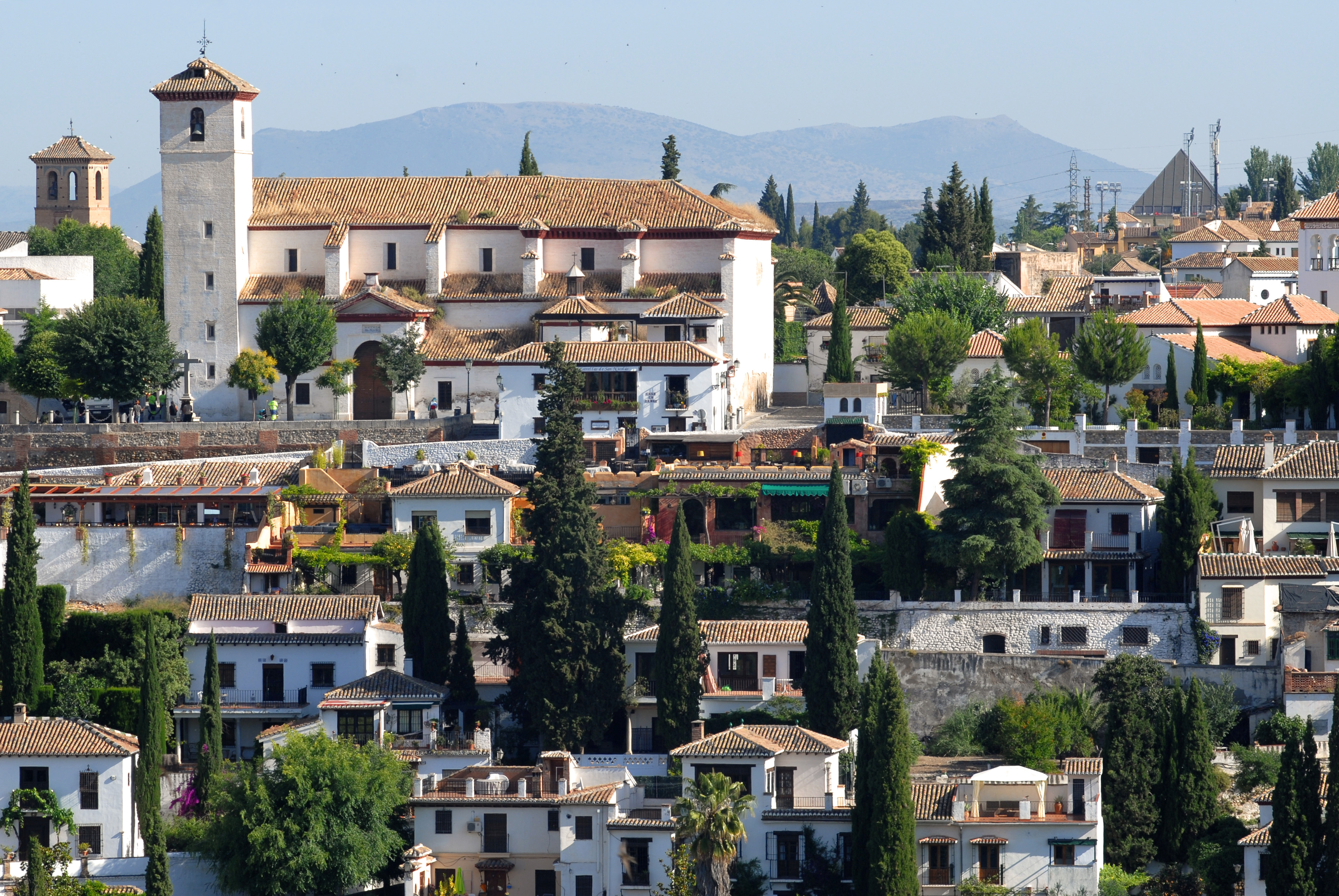
The Church and mirador of San Nicolas at the top of the Albaicín hill (seen from the Alhambra)

- Church of Santa Ana: A church overlooking Plaza Nueva at the beginning of the Carrera del Darro. It was begun from around 1537 and completed circa 1561 with a Renaissance-style façade and a Mudéjar-style bell tower.
- Church of El Salvador (Collegiate Church of San Salvador): A church located at Plaza del Salvador (off Cuesta del Chapiz), on the site of the neighbourhood's former main mosque. The original mosque was consecrated as a church in 1499 by Cardinal Cisneros, in violation of the city's terms of surrender, and became a parish church in 1501. A new church building was constructed by the Catholic Monarchs in the 16th century. The church was severely damaged by riots in 1936.
- Church of San Juan de los Reyes: A 16th-century church with an Almohad-era minaret, on San Juan de los Reyes street. The church was built circa 1520.
- Church of San José: a Mudéjar-style church with a former 11th-century minaret. The church is dated to 1525, but the former mosque had been consecrated as a church as early as 1494.
- Church and mirador of San Nicolas: The church overlooking Plaza de San Nicolas, a famous lookout point (mirador) with views of the Alhambra from the top of the Albaicin hill. The original church, built on the site of a former mosque, was in a Mudéjar style in the 16th century. It was almost completely destroyed by rioters and looters in 1932 and rebuilt afterwards.
- Church of San Miguel Bajo: Church in the small square of San Miguel Bajo. The church was built in the 16th century with some Gothic elements, a Mudéjar-style ceiling, and Renaissance-style exterior portals. It was closed in 1842 and has since lost many of its historical furnishings. A 13th-century cistern, belonging to a former mosque on the same site, is still present and its arched opening is visible on the church's exterior.
- Church and mirador of San Cristobal: Church Carretera de Murcia. It was built in 1501 with a mix of Mudéjar and Gothic elements. A viewpoint (mirador) by the same name is found nearby, with views towards the southern Albaicin and the Alhambra beyond.
- Church of San Ildefonso: A church built from 1553 to 1559 on the edge of the Albaicin neighbourhood, with a mix of Renaissance and Mudéjar architectural elements and a Baroque altarpiece.
- Church of San Luis: Church on Calle San Luis, currently ruined. It was originally completed in 1526 in a typical Mudéjar style, with later additions in the 18th century. It was damaged and left in its current state during the 1930s.
- Church of St. Peter & St. Paul: Church on the Carrera del Darro, built in the second half of the 16th century in a mix of Mudéjar and Renaissance style.
- Hermitage of San Miguel Alto: Church on Calle San Miguel, above the Sacromonte neighbourhood. It was originally built in 1671 on the site of a former Nasrid fortification tower, Burj al-Zeitun ("Tower of the Olive Tree"), but it was destroyed during the French occupation in the early 19th century and rebuilt a few years after.

=== Historic houses and palaces ===
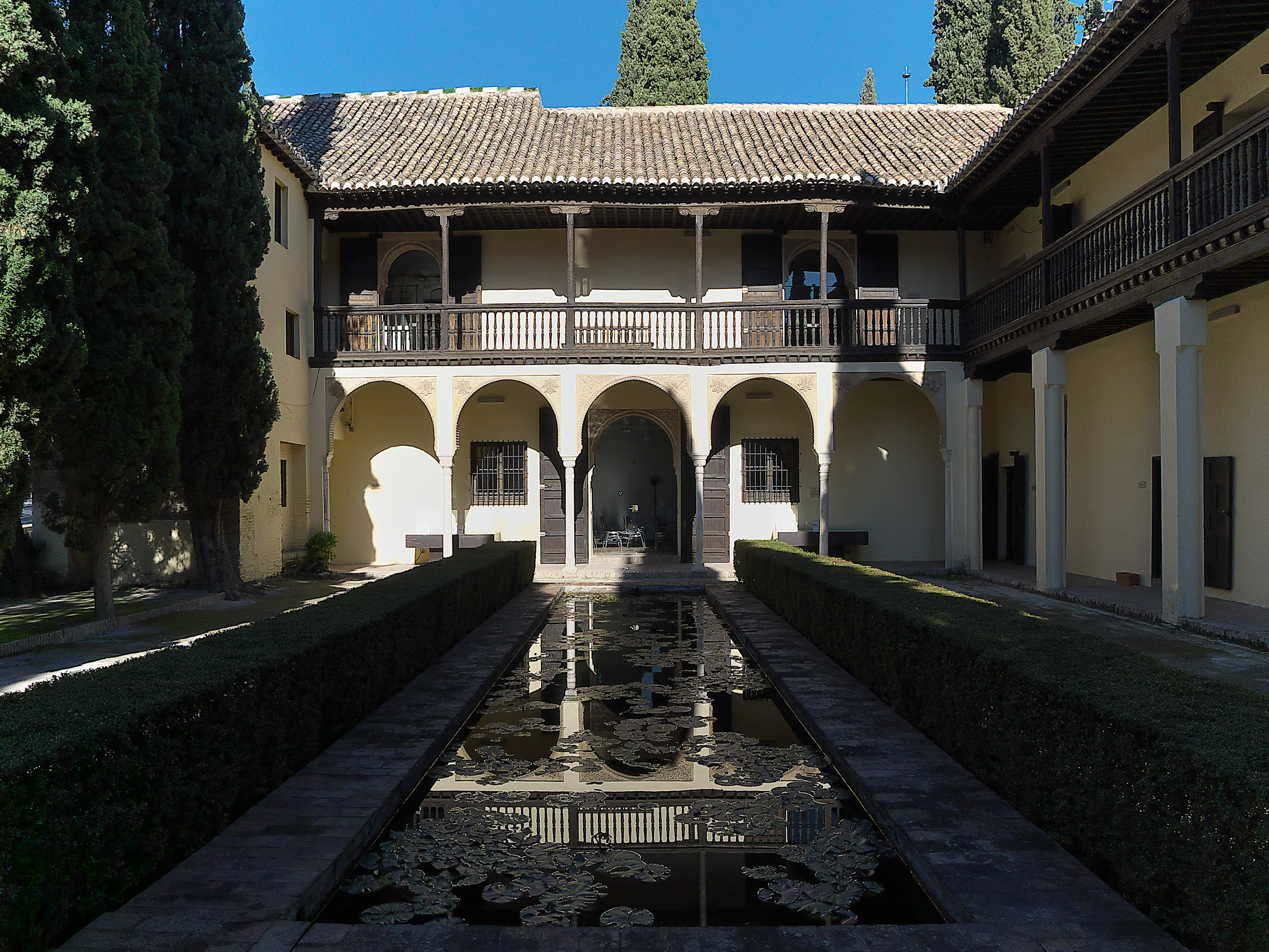
Southern courtyard of the Casa del Chapiz, built in the 16th century but incorporating remains of a 14th-century Nasrid house

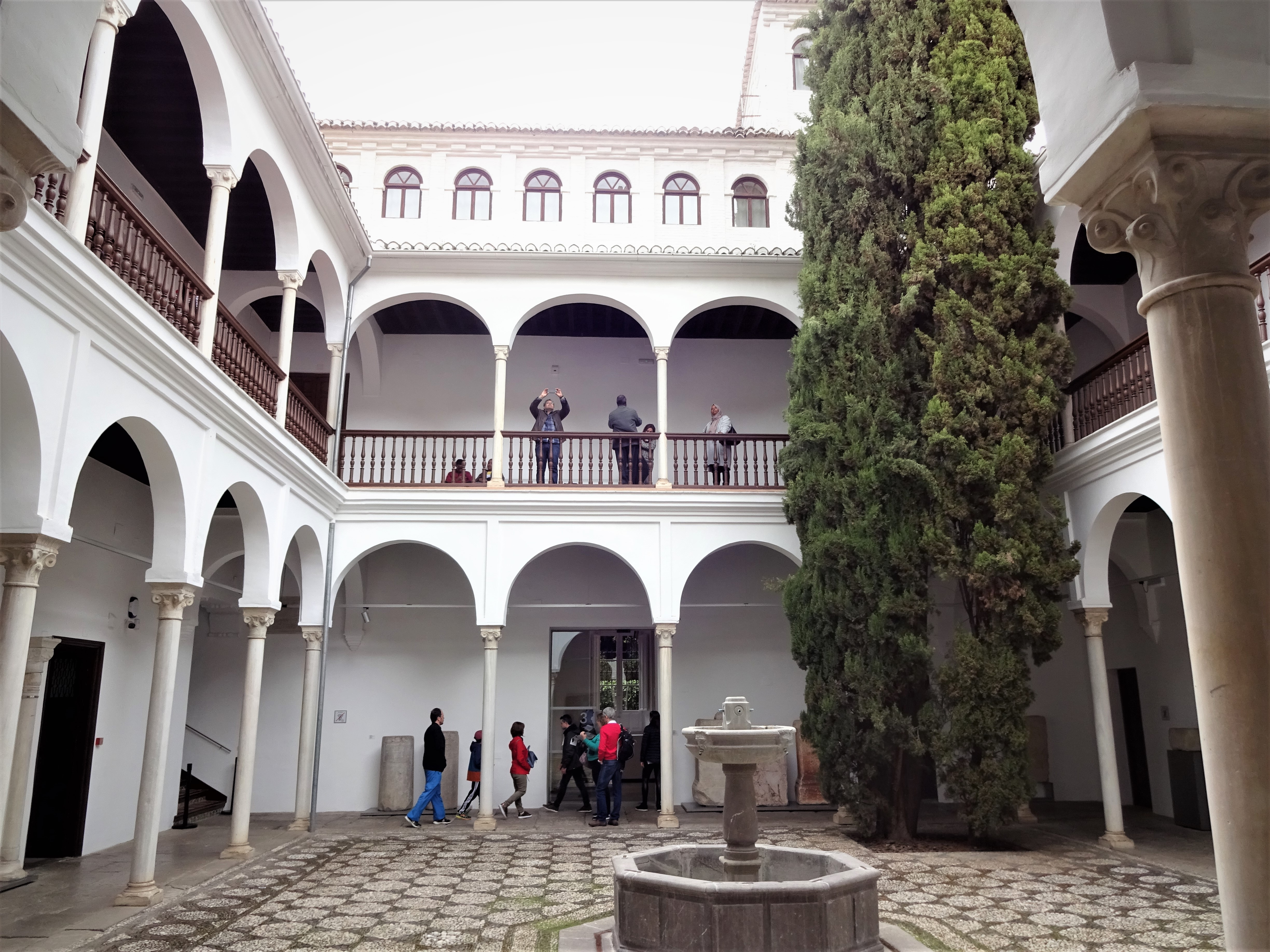
Courtyard of the 16th-century Castril Palace (Archaeological Museum)

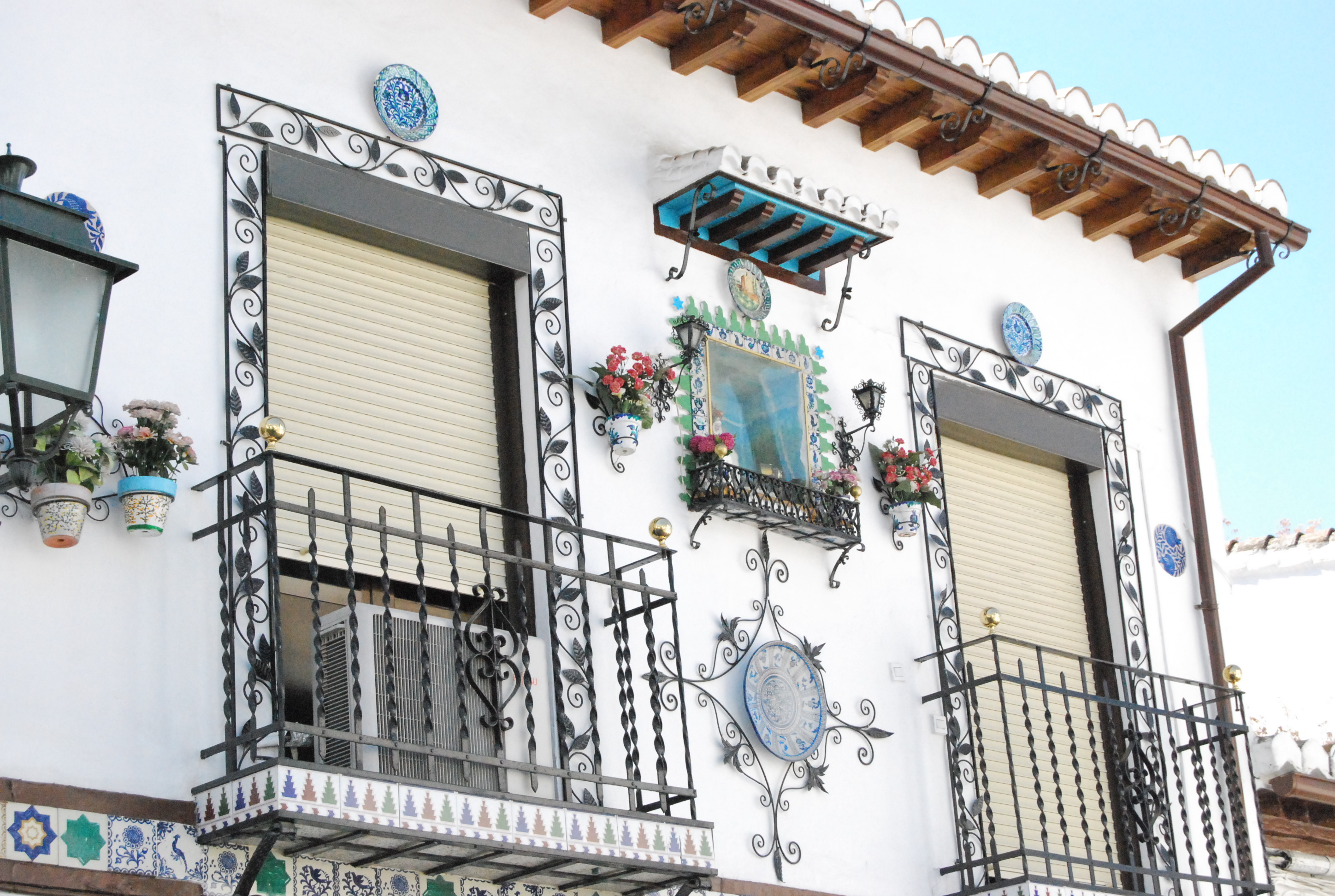
House façade in Cuesta de Alhacaba

- Dar al-Horra: A 15th-century Nasrid palace, now open as a historic monument.
- Casa de Zafra: A 14th to 15th-century Nasrid mansion, re-opened as an Interpretative Center.
- Casa Nazarí de la calle del Cobertizo de Santa Inés nº 4: A Nasrid-era house built in the 14th century, modified in the 15th century and again in the 17th century. Restored in the 1980s, it's an important well-preserved example of Nasrid domestic architecture. The house is still used as a residence and is not open to the public.
- Casa Horno del Oro: A Nasrid-era house, built in the late 15th century and expanded in the 16th century with the addition of a second floor. It is now open to tourists.
- Casa del Chapiz: A residential complex consisting of two connected houses built on the remains of a Nasrid-era mansion of the 14th century known as the Dar al-Baida ("White House"). Both houses are centered around internal courtyards and were built in the 16th century in a style typical of Morisco architecture at the time. The southern house, which has a larger courtyard with a pool at its center, preserves remains of the former Nasrid house in its layout and in the courtyard's portico, which reuses Nasrid-era columns. The two houses were built by members of the same family, Lorenzo el Chapiz and Hernán López el Ferí, from which the complex and the adjoining street take their current names.
- Castril Palace: A mansion built in 1539 on the Carrera del Darro, currently housing the Archaeological Museum of Granada.
- Casa Yanguas: House on Calle Yanguas, dating from the 15th–16th centuries.
- Casa del Almirante (de Aragón): A house on Calle San José, built in the 16th century by Lady Leonor Manrique in a Renaissance and Mannerist style. It was later inhabited by the Admiral (Almirante) of Aragón, from after whom it is now named.
- Palacio de los Córdova (Cordova Palace): A Renaissance-style mansion commissioned by Lord Luis Fernández de Córdova in 1530. Its Mannerist portal and Renaissance-style courtyard are among its most notable architectural elements. The house was originally located at the now-vanished intersection of Calle de la Sierpe with Plaza de las Descalzas, but it was demolished in 1919. Between 1960 and 1967 it was rebuilt, with the help of preserved original materials, at its current location on Cuesta del Chapiz. It currently houses the Municipal Archives.
- Casa de Porras: Mansion at Placeta de los Porras, built in the 16th century in a mix of Renaissance and Morisco/Mudéjar architecture, with a Plateresque external façade.
- Casa de los Mascarones: A 16th to 17th-century house on Calle Pages, named after the mascarones that decorate the building. In the 17th century it was inhabited by the poet Pedro Soto de Rojas and the sculptor José de Mora.

=== Cisterns (aljibes) ===
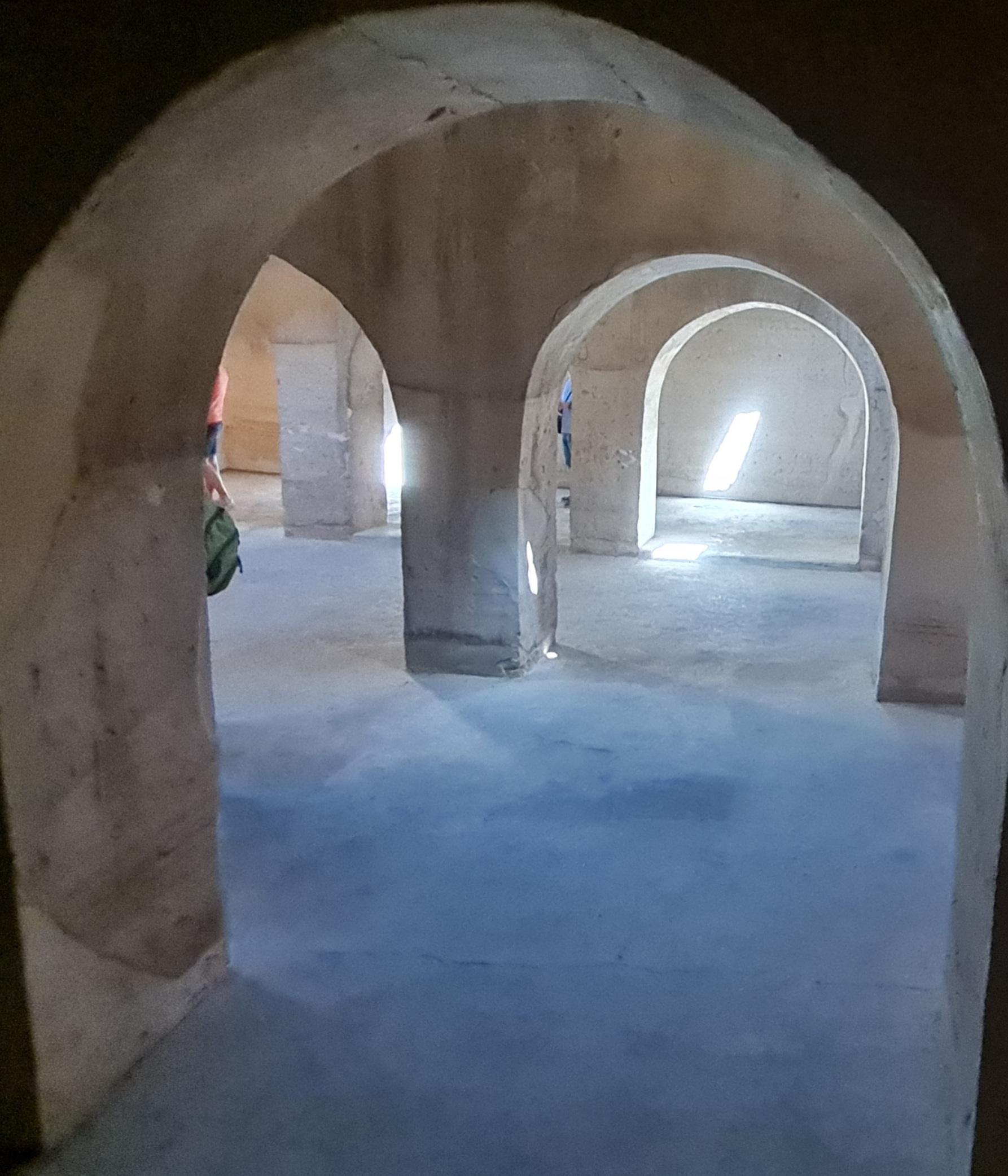
Interior of the Aljibe del Rey (11th century)

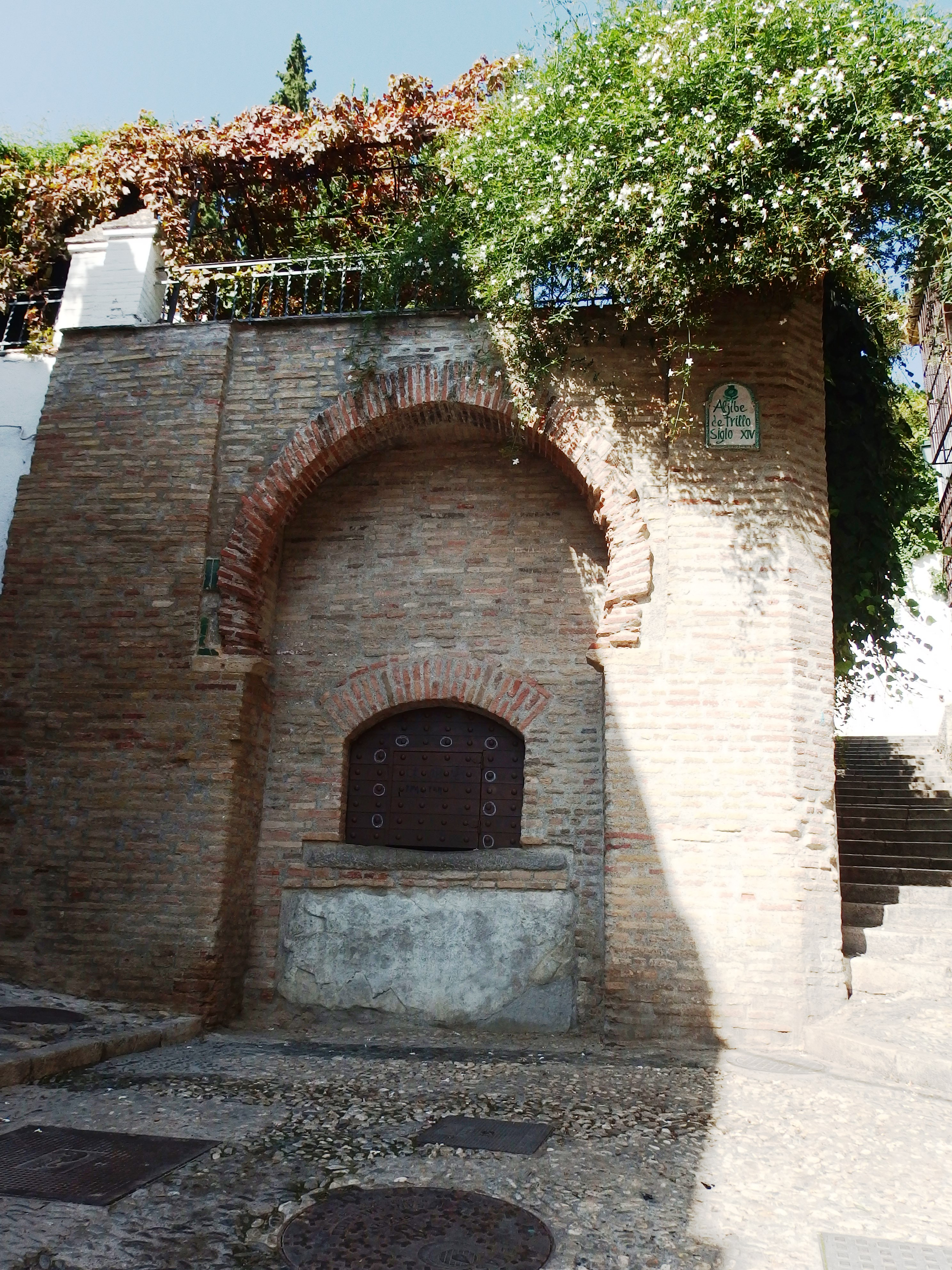
Entrance to the Aljibe de Trillo (14th century)

A network of numerous cisterns, dating from as far back as the 11th century, are still extant throughout the neighbourhood. The openings to some of the cisterns are visible at street level. Among the most notable examples are:

- Aljibe del Rey: The Aljibe del Rey ("King's Cistern"), originally known in Arabic as the al-Jubb al-Qadīm ("the Old Cistern"), is the largest medieval cistern in the Albaicin, with a capacity of 300 cubic metres. It dates from the 11th century and was used in part to serve the Zirid citadel (al-Qaṣaba al-Qadīma). It is now located under a public square called Placeta Cristo de las Azucenas. A nearby historic house, Carmen Aljibe del Rey, was recently reconstructed and now serves as the Water Interpretation Centre, with access to the cistern. A street-side opening to the cistern is located on the exterior corner of the building, but it dates from a modern reconstruction.
- Aljibe de Trillo: The Aljibe de Trillo is a 14th-century Nasrid cistern, with an arched opening situated on the street of the same name (named after a local poet). It has a capacity of 50 cubic metres and is a good example of a cistern from the Nasrid period.
- Aljibe de San Miguel (Bajo): This 13th-century Nasrid cistern was part of a former mosque, now the Church of San Miguel Bajo. The arched opening of the cistern is visible on the side of the church, next to the public square called Placeta de San Miguel Bajo.
- Aljibe de San Cristóbal: This medieval cistern is visible next to the Church of San Cristobal, which was built on top of a former mosque. The cistern has a large arched entrance below street level that is accessible via a staircase. It was restored in 1989.

=== Other ===
- Royal Chancellery of Granada: Established in 1505 by the Catholic Monarchs, this chancery had jurisdiction over the southern half of Spain. Its various elements were built over several decades, with its exterior façade, designed in a Mannerist style by Francisco del Castillo, being completed in 1587. It is located on Plaza Nueva.
- Great Mosque of Granada (Mezquita Mayor de Granada): Built in 2003, it is the first mosque constructed in Granada after the city came under Catholic control in 1492.

== Albaicín in art ==
19th century paintings of Albaicín

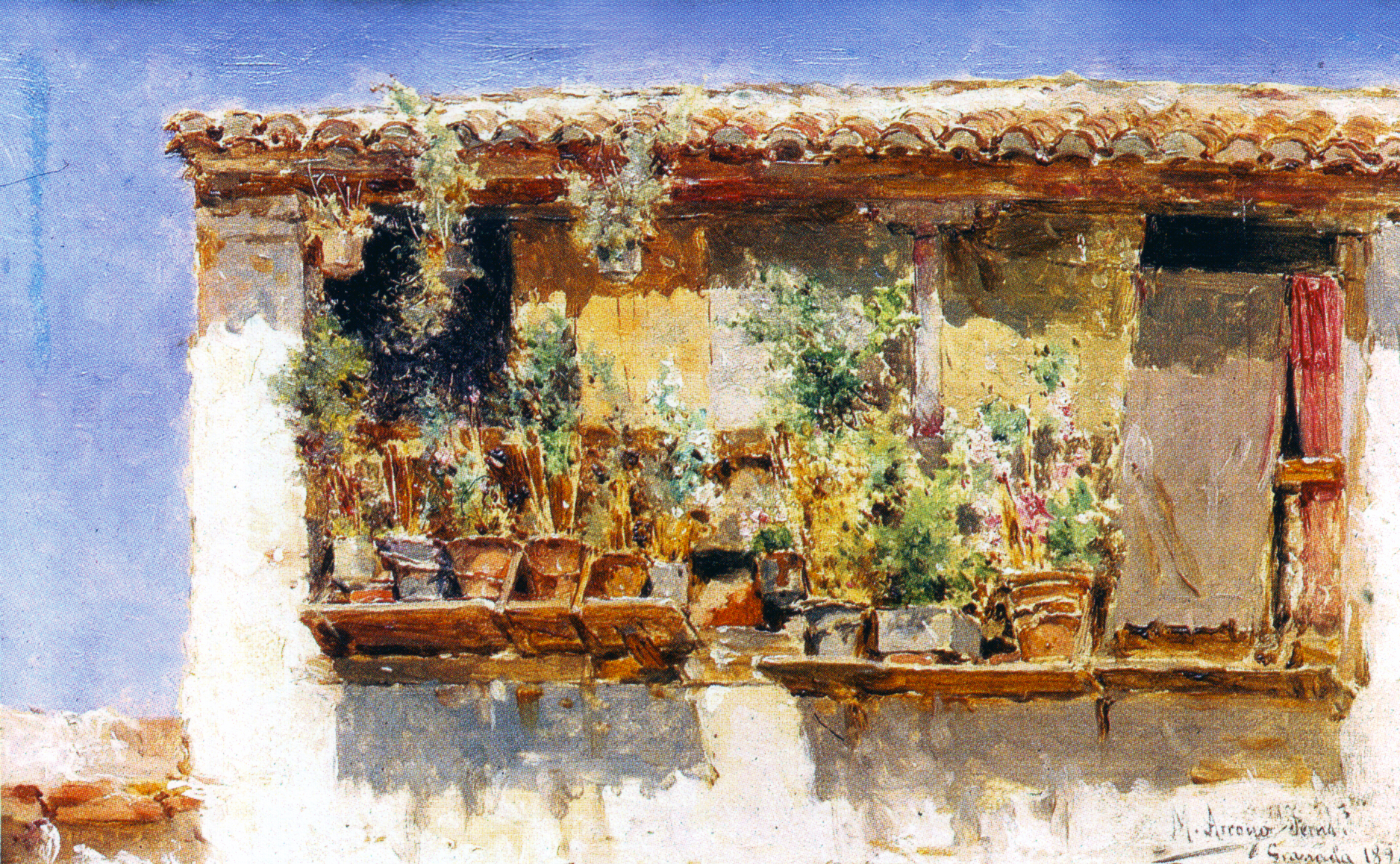
A balcony in the Albayzín by painter M. Arroyo Fernandez in 1891, stored at Biblioteca Provincial de Granada

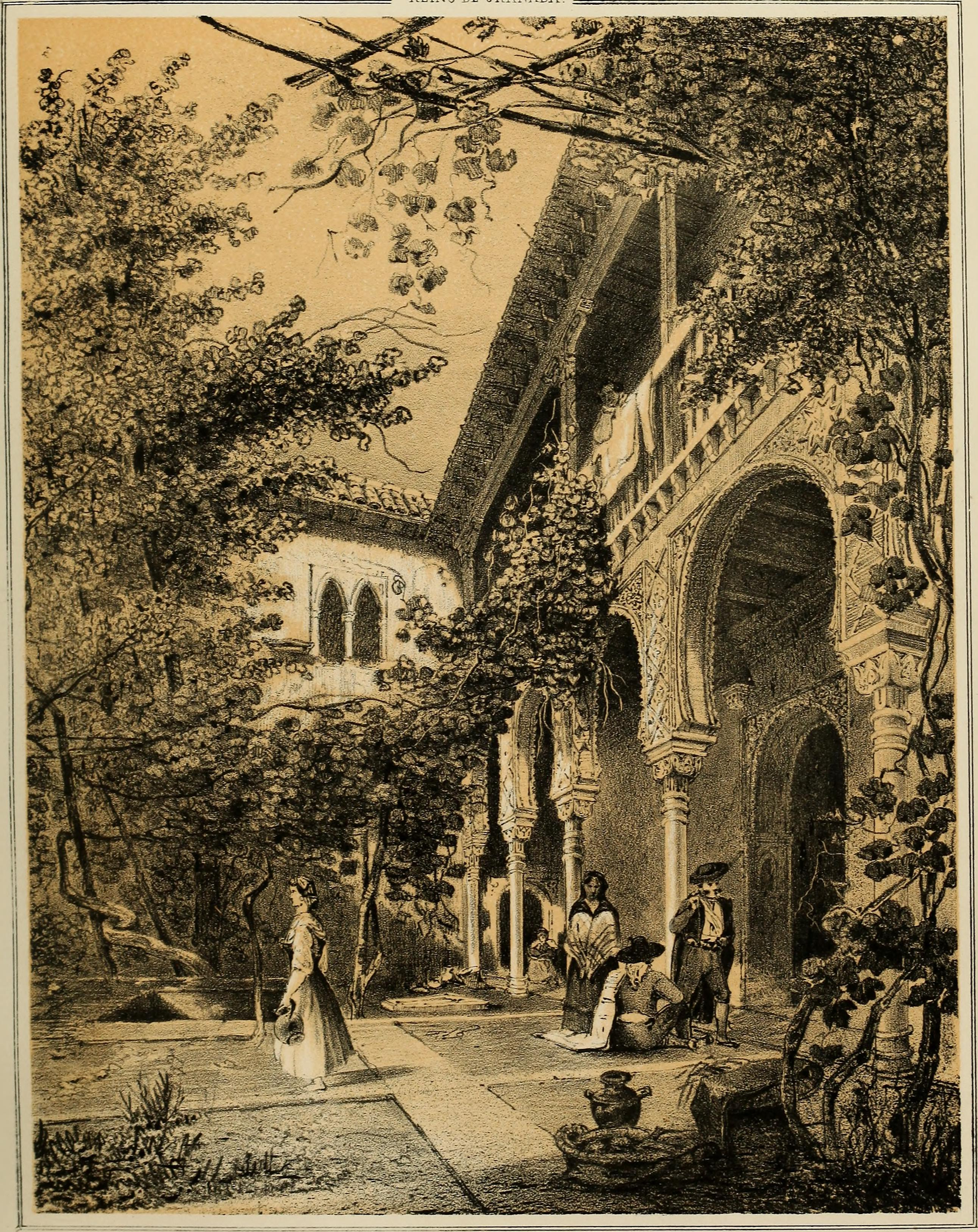
Casa del Chapiz in the Albaicín by Francesc Pi i Margall and Francesc Xavier Parcerisa in 1850, published in the work Recuerdos y bellezas de España

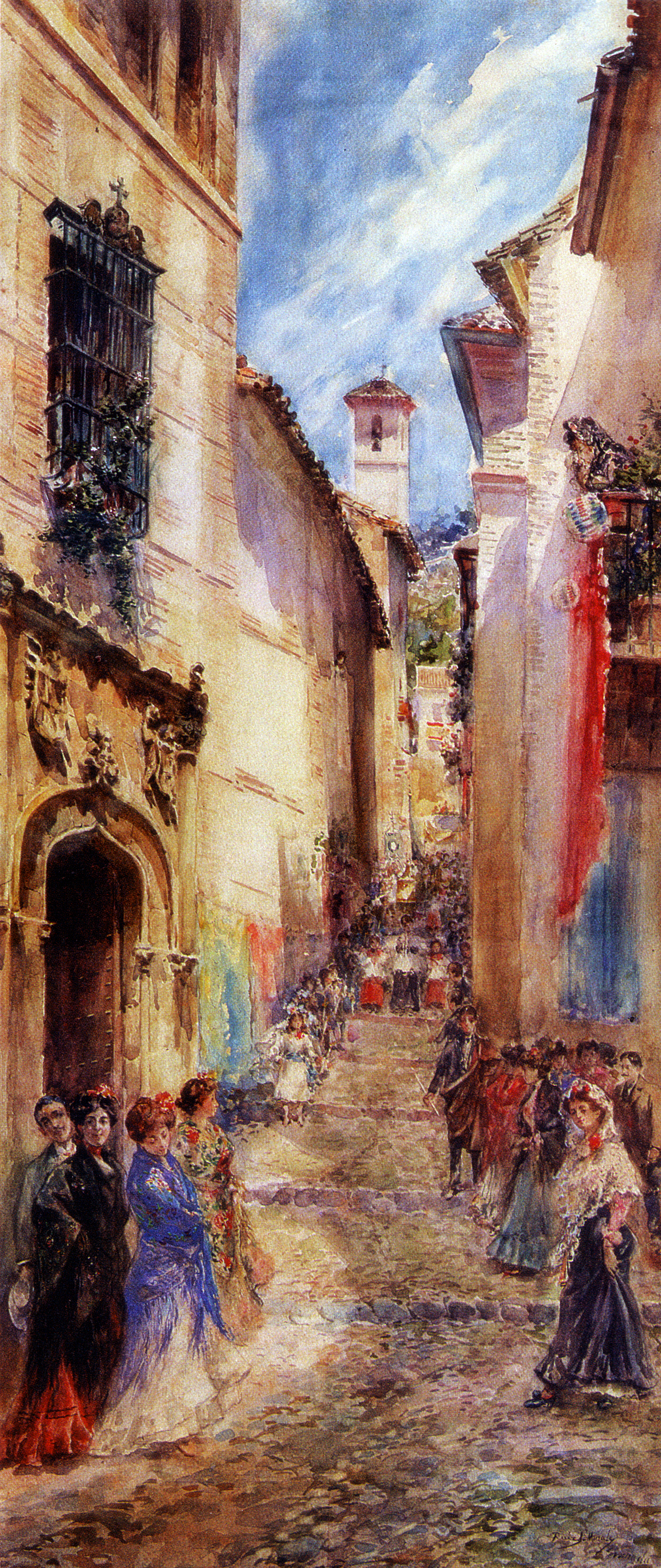
Procession of the Viaticum on the street of Zafra, the Albaicín by Manuel Ruiz Sanchez Morales (1853–1922), stored at Biblioteca Provincial de Granada

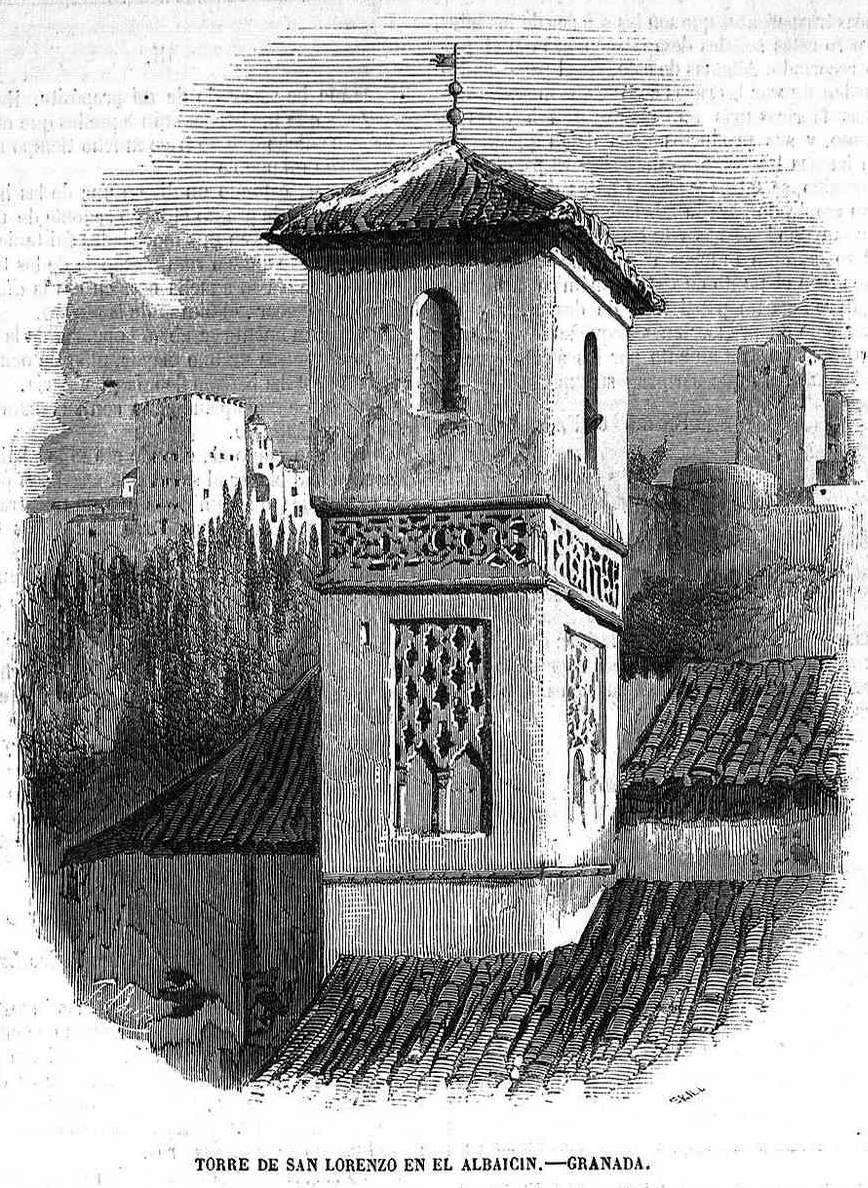
Tower of San Lorenzo in the Albaicín. Drawing by Federico Ruiz (1837–1868), engraving by Edward Skill (1831–1873), published in the Spanish magazine El Museo Universal

== Sources ==
- Enamorado, Virgilio Martinez (2011). "Falcons and Falconry in Al-Andalus". Studia Orientalia. 111. ISBN 9789519380797.
- Dickie, James (2021). "Granada: A Case Study of Arab Urbanism in Muslim Spain". In Jayyusi, Salma Khadra (ed.). The Legacy of Muslim Spain. Brill. ISBN 978-90-04-50259-8.
- Fromherz, Allen (2021). "The Berber Empires in Granada (6th–7th/12th–13th Centuries). Revolution or Continuity?". In Boloix-Gallardo, Bárbara (ed.). A Companion to Islamic Granada. Brill. ISBN 978-90-04-42581-1.
- Poitou, Eugene (1872). Spain and Its People: A Record of Recent Travel ... T. Nelson and Sons.
- Arnold, Felix (2017). Islamic Palace Architecture in the Western Mediterranean: A History. Oxford University Press. ISBN 9780190624552.
- Barrucand, Marianne; Bednorz, Achim (1992). Moorish architecture in Andalusia. Taschen. ISBN 3822876348.
- Bloom, Jonathan M. (2020). Architecture of the Islamic West: North Africa and the Iberian Peninsula, 700–1800. Yale University Press. ISBN 9780300218701.
- Coleman, David (2013). Creating Christian Granada: Society and Religious Culture in an Old-World Frontier City, 1492–1600. Cornell University Press. ISBN 978-0-8014-6876-6.
- Dickie, James; Marín, Manuela (1992). "Granada: A Case Study of Arab Urbanism in Muslim Spain". In Jayyushi, Salma Khadra (ed.). The Legacy of Muslim Spain. Brill. ISBN 978-90-04-09599-1.
- Harvey, L.P. (1990). Islamic Spain, 1250 to 1500. University of Chigaco Press. ISBN 0226319628.
- Kennedy, Hugh (1996). Muslim Spain and Portugal: A Political History of al-Andalus. Routledge. ISBN 9781317870418.
- Orihuela, Antonio (2021). "From the Private to the Public Space: Domestic and Urban Architecture of Islamic Granada". In Boloix-Gallardo, Bárbara (ed.). A Companion to Islamic Granada. Brill. pp. 407–440. ISBN 978-90-04-42581-1.
- Rėklaitytė, Ieva (2021). "The Rumor of Water: A Key Element of Moorish Granada". In Boloix-Gallardo, Bárbara (ed.). A Companion to Islamic Granada. Brill. pp. 441–462. ISBN 978-90-04-42581-1.
- Ring, Trudy; Salkin, Robert M; La Boda, Sharon (1995). International Dictionary of Historic Places: Southern Europe. Fitzroy Dearborn. ISBN 1-884964-04-4.
- Rodgers, Helen; Cavendish, Stephen (2021). City of Illusions: A History of Granada. Oxford University Press. ISBN 9780197619414.
