= Max Moreau =

Belgian painter (1902–1992)

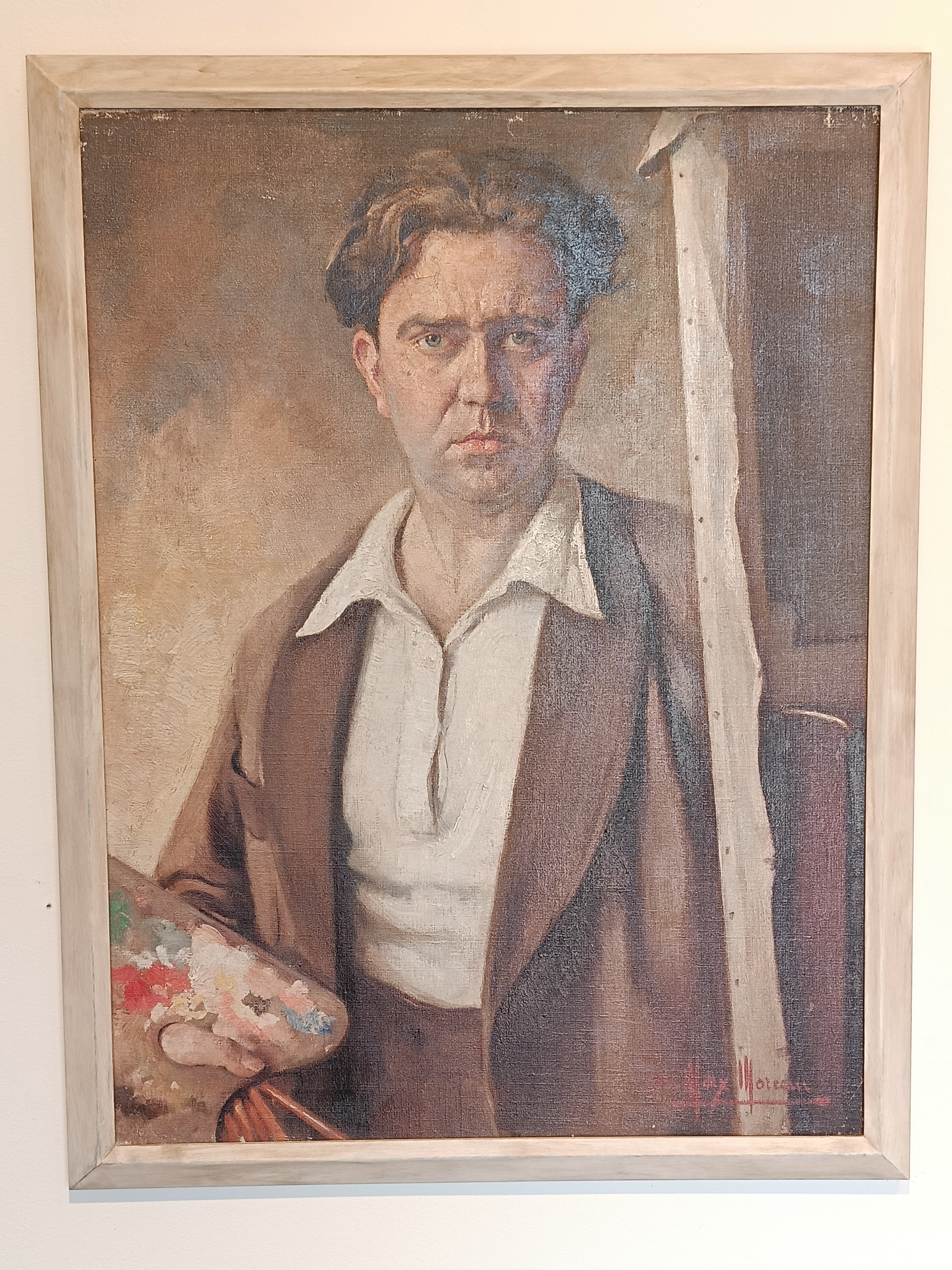
- Born: 2 September 1902; Soignies, Belgium
- Died: 2 September 1992 (aged 90); Albaicín, Granada, Spain
- Known for: Portraiture / landscapes
- Movement: Realism

Max Moreau (1902–1992) was a Franco-Belgian painter. He worked mainly in North Africa and in southern Spain, specialising in portraiture. He died in Granada in 1992, bequeathing his entire estate to the city. His home in the Albaicín is now a museum commemorating his life and work, the Carmen de Los Geranios, Centro Cultural Max Moreau.

== Life and works ==
Max Leo Moreau was born in Soignies, Belgium on 2 September 1902, the son of an artist. Largely self-taught, although he did receive training in draughtsmanship from his father, at the end of World War I Moreau moved with his family to Paris where he gained employment as a set designer and formed a strong friendship with the actor and director, Denis d'Inès. In 1928 Moreau married Félicie Leclercq, (Note: Félicie Moreau (1905-1996) died at Los Geranios on 8 December 1996.) and the next year they travelled to Tunisia, beginning a lifelong mutual appreciation of the Moorish culture of North Africa and southern Spain. They lived in France during World War II, and at its end travelled extensively in Morocco, the Caribbean, America and Europe, (Note: Moreau and his wife reportedly undertook over 1,000 foreign excursions during the course of their marriage.) with Moreau frequently painting portraits of the leading members of the social circles in which they found themselves. In 1966, they settled in Granada, Spain, purchasing a property in the historic Albaicín district, the Carmen de los Geranios (House of the Geraniums). The house was dilapidated at the time of their purchase, and the Moreaus devoted much time and effort to its reconstruction.

In addition to his society portraiture, from which he earned a great deal of money, Moreau specialised in Realist portraits of the inhabitants of the Northern Africa cities he visited, and of Granada, where he finally settled. Moreau held his last exhibition in 1981 and his final decade was marred by Parkinson's disease.

Moreau died in 1992, on the day of his birth, 2 September, at the age of 90. He bequeathed his entire estate to the city of Granada. His home is now a museum dedicated to his life and works, the Centro Cultural Max Moreau. The museum opened in 1998 and consists of the painter's house, accommodation for his housekeeper, his study/studio, gardens and an orchard. His studio contains a permanent exhibition of some of the best examples of his work.

== Gallery ==
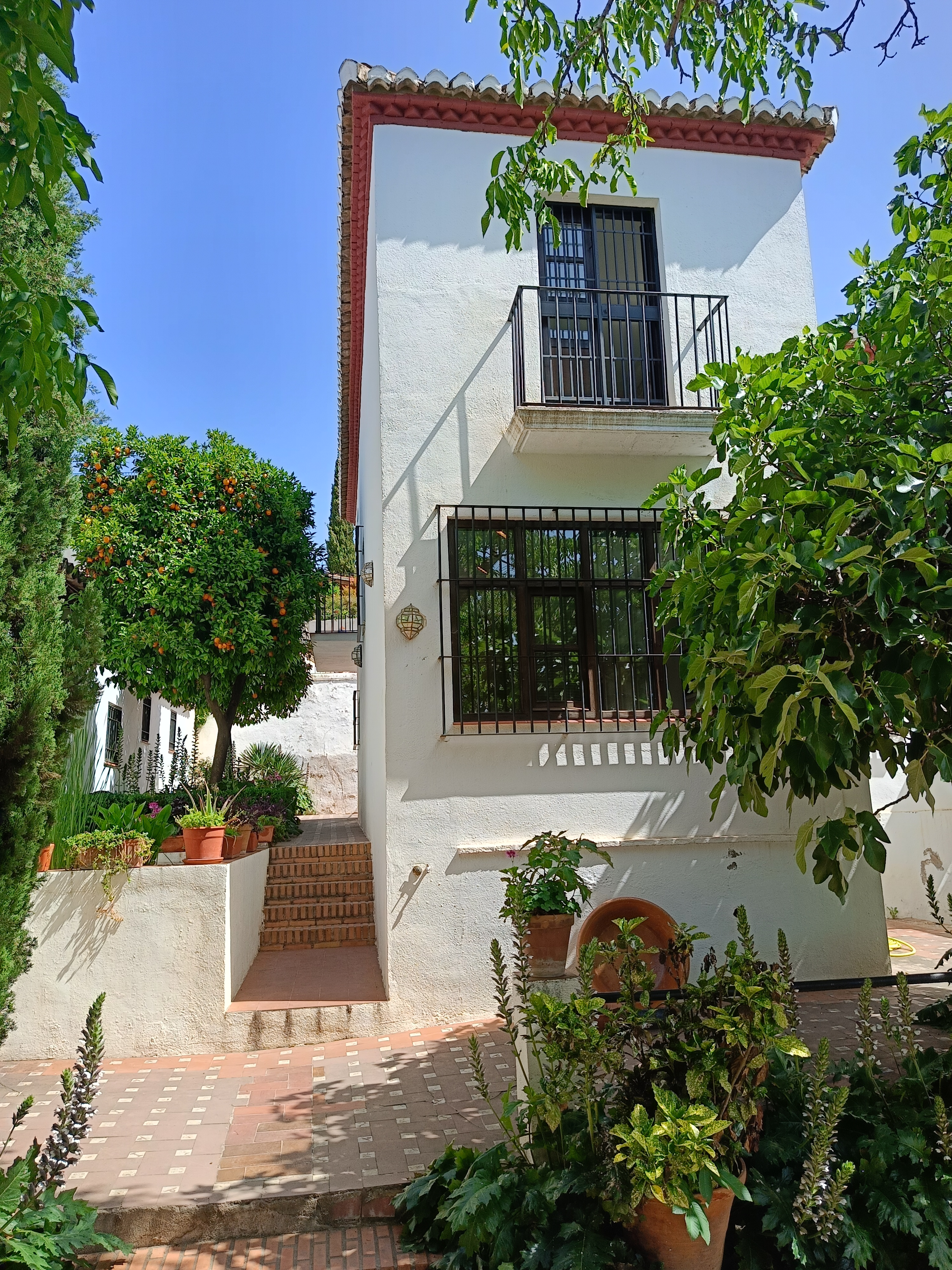
Carmen de Los Geranios

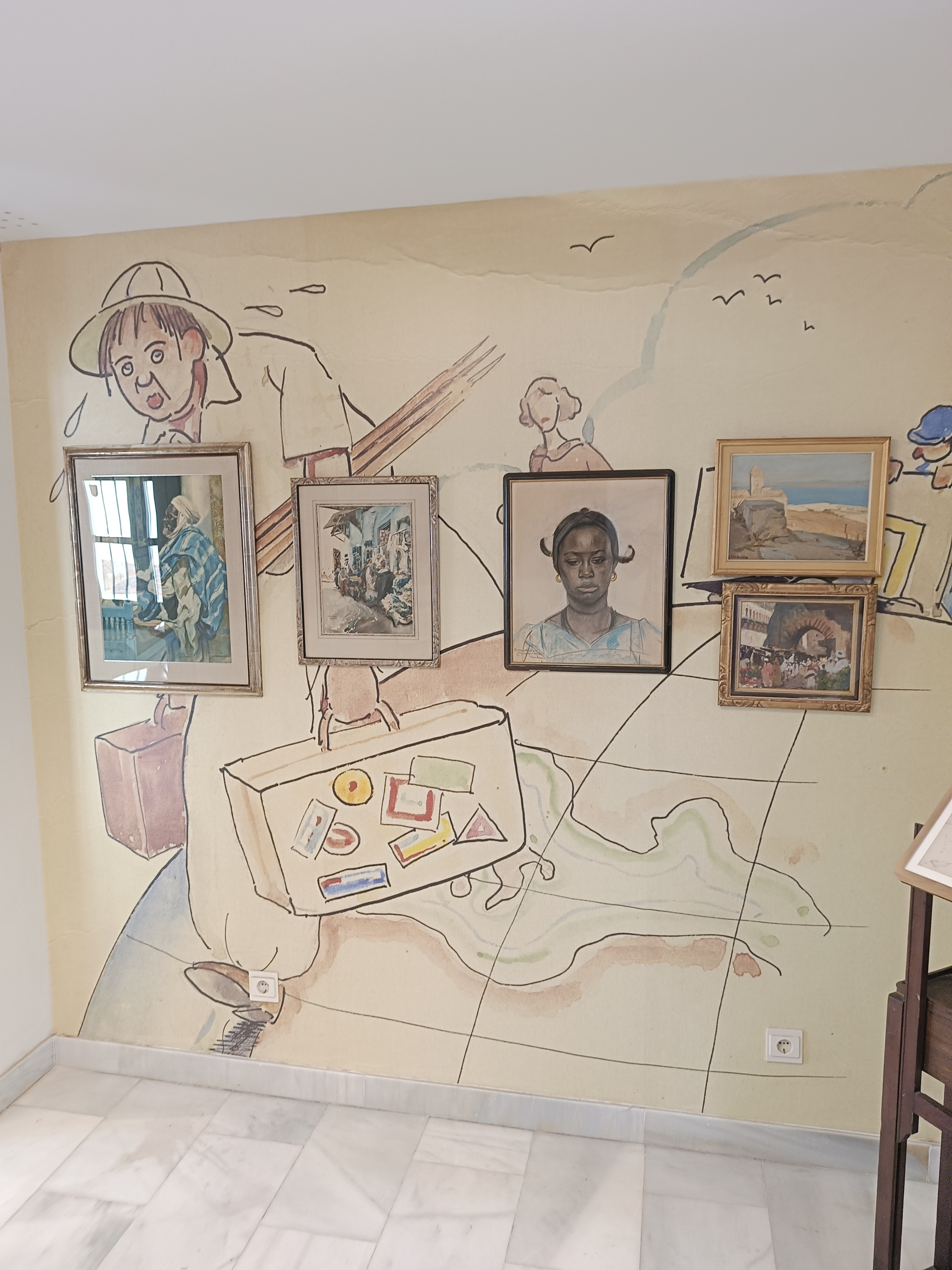
The studio

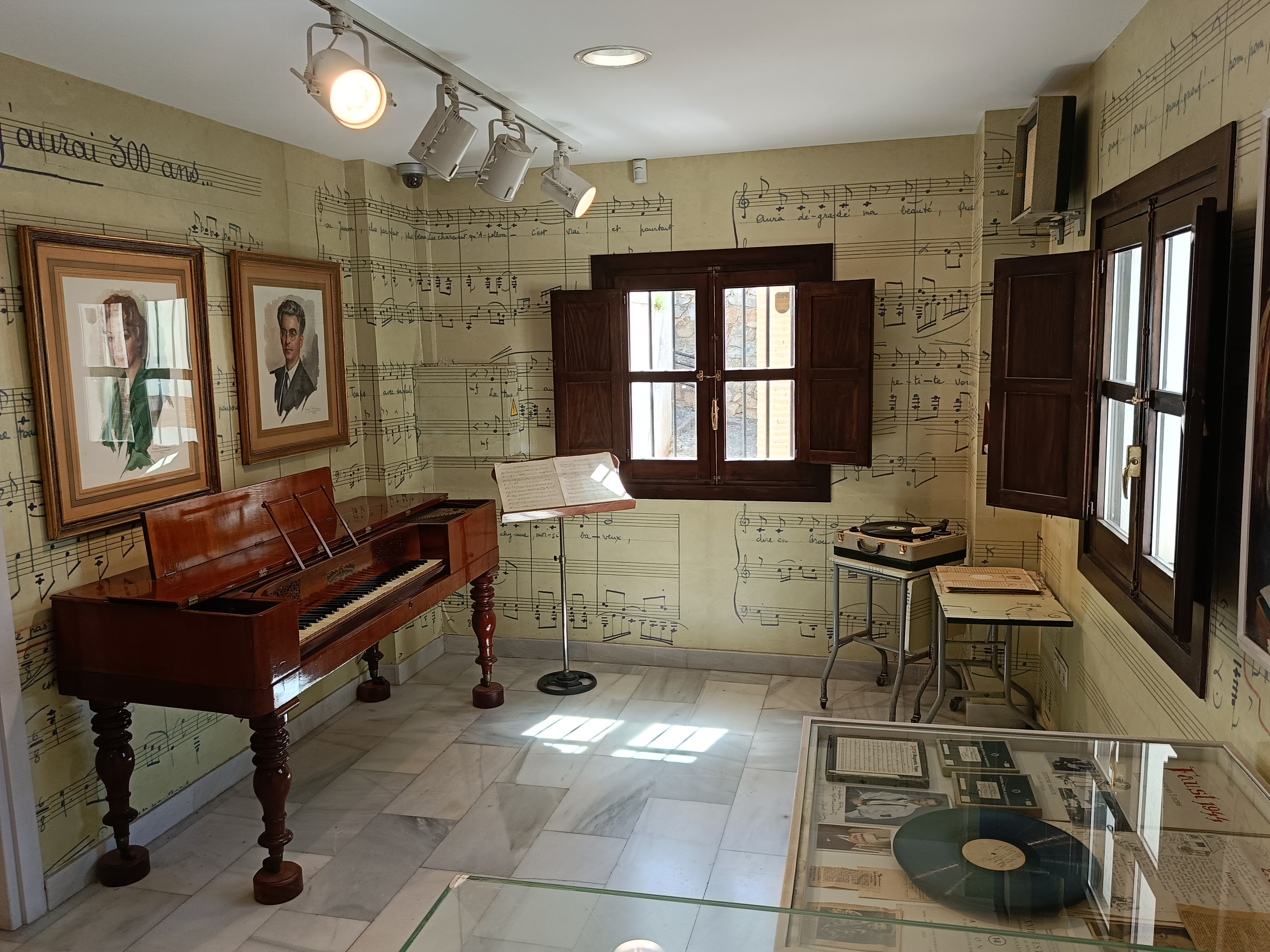
The Music Room

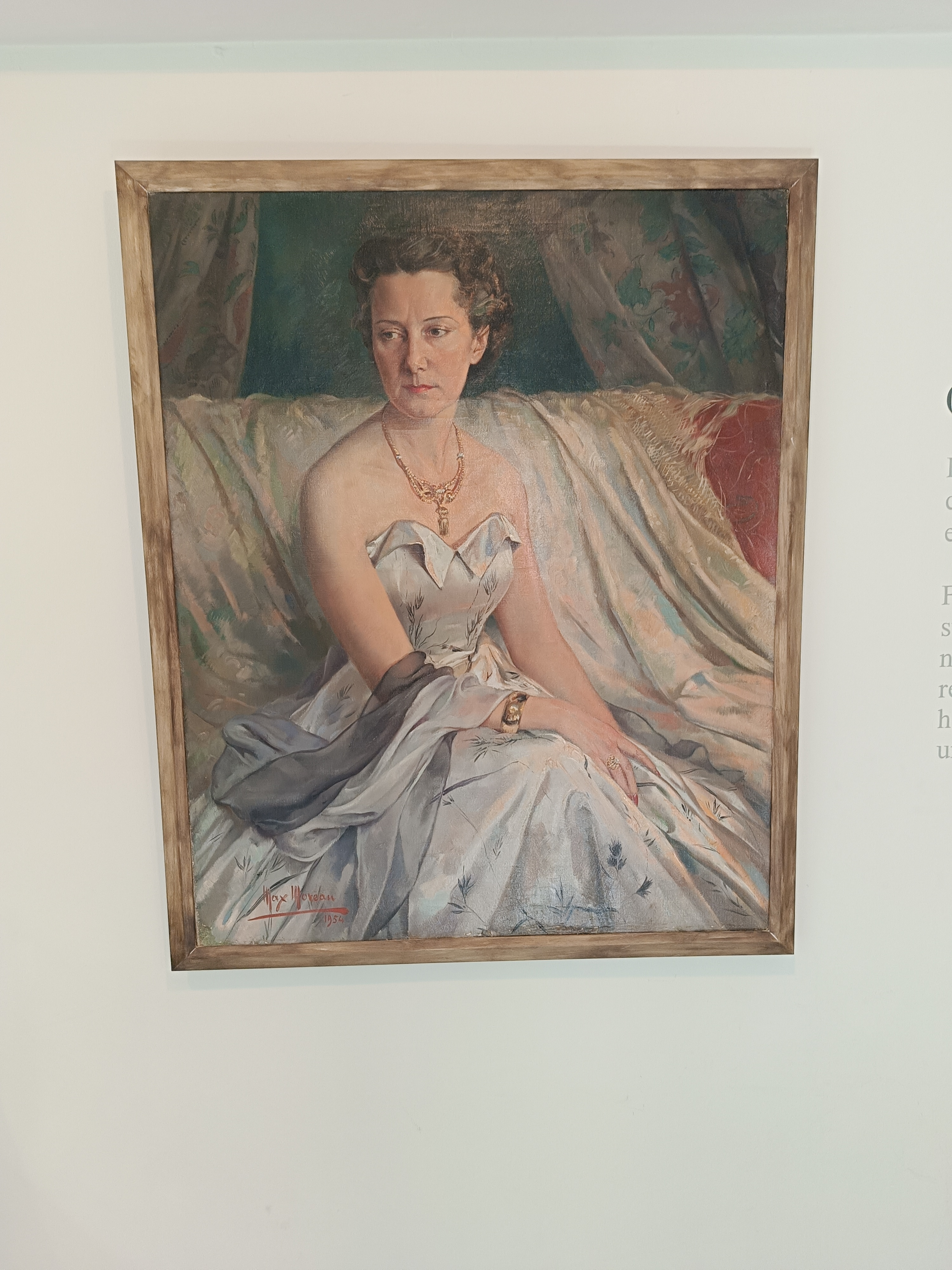
Félicie Moreau

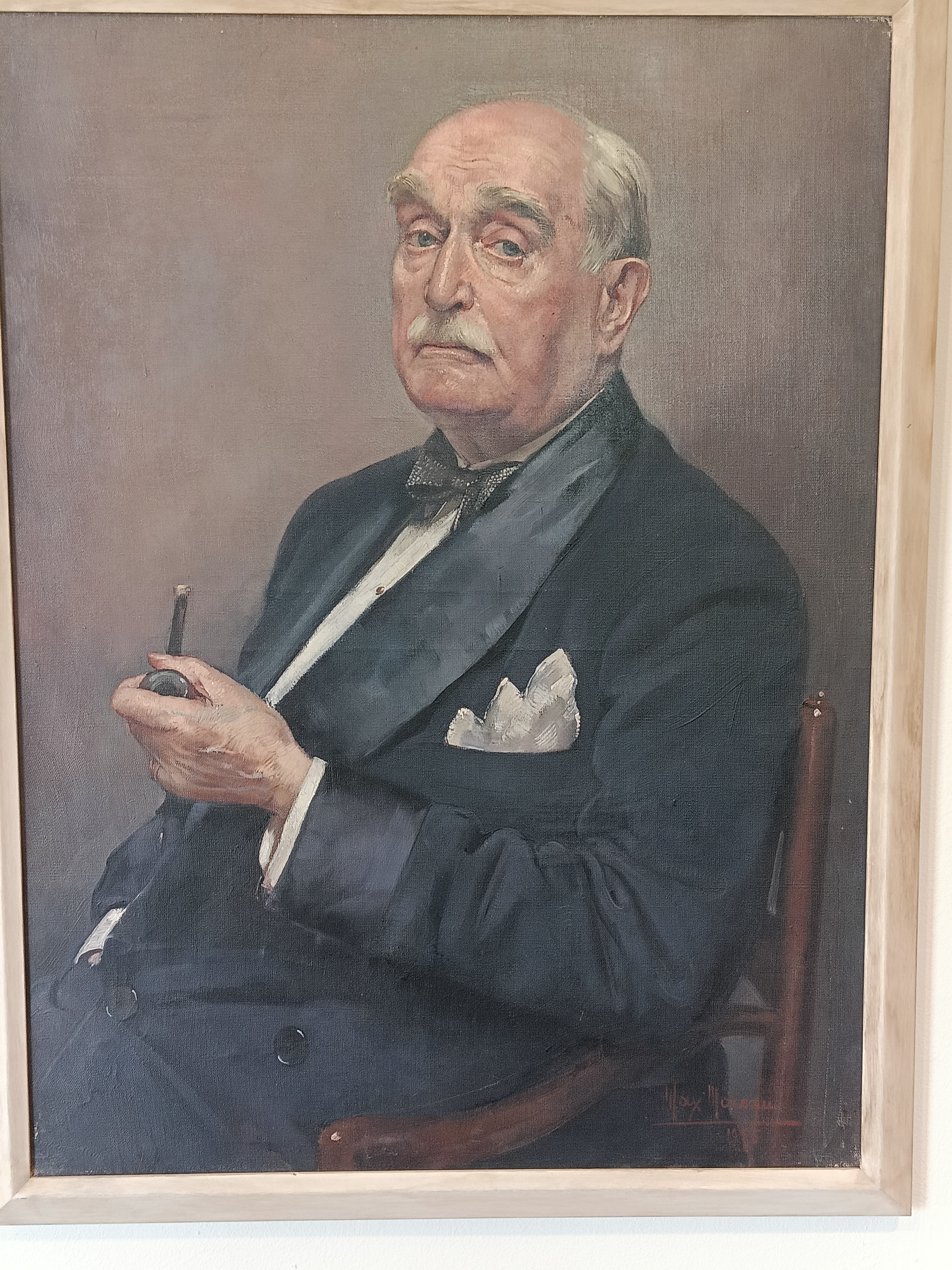
Portrait of a man

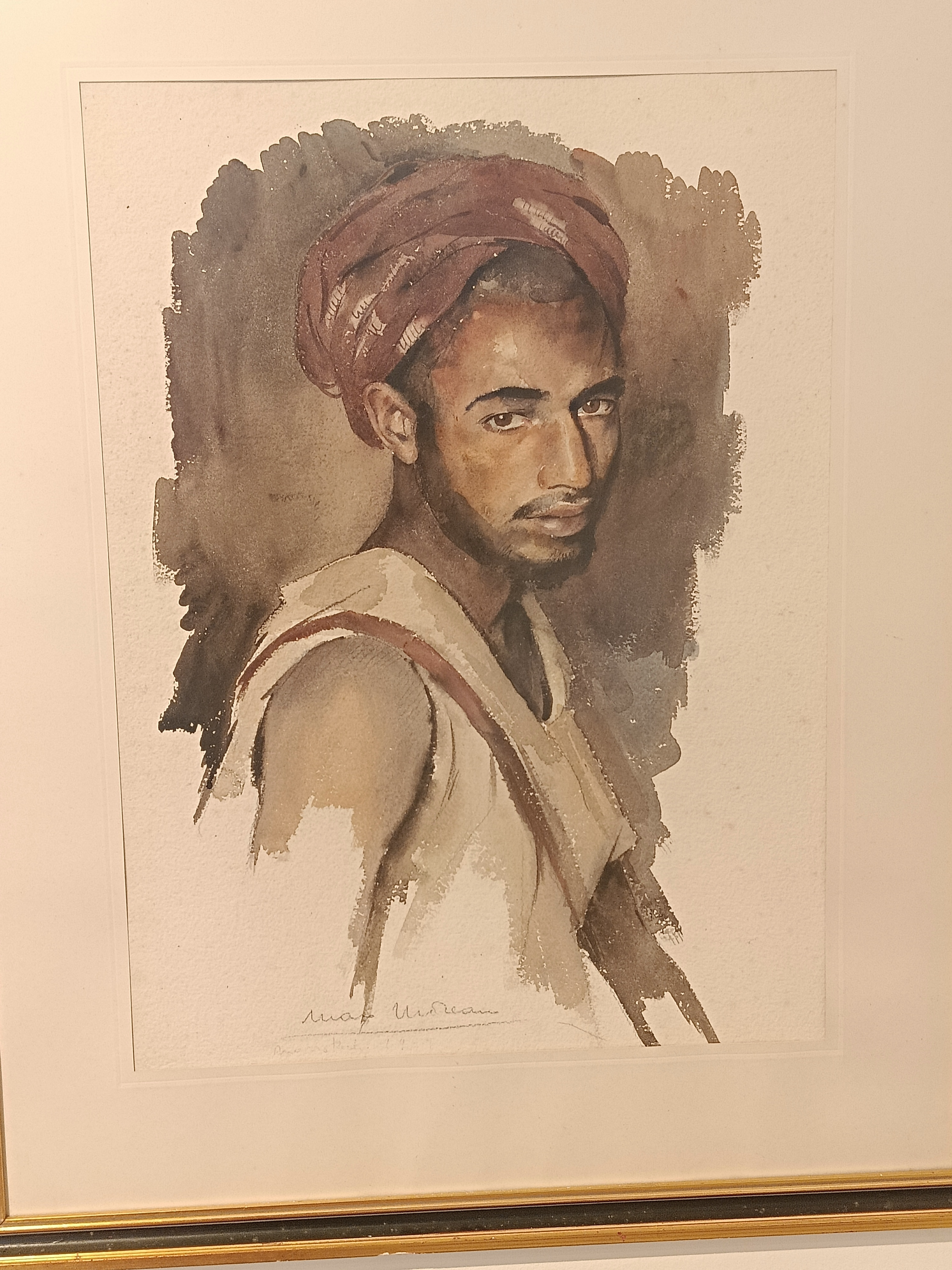
Portrait of an Arab

== Sources ==
- Noble, Isabella; Clark, Gregor (2019). Lonely Planet Andalucia. Fort Mill, South Carolina, US: Lonely Planet. ISBN 9781788681681.
- Wolpert, Martin; Winter, Jeffrey (2006). Figurative Paintings: Paris and the Modern Spirit. Atglen, Pennsylvania, US: Schiffer Publishing. ISBN 9780764324628.
