= Church of San Miguel Bajo =

Church in Granada, Spain

Church of Santa María de la Aurora y San Miguel
- Iglesia de Santa María de la Aurora y San Miguel.
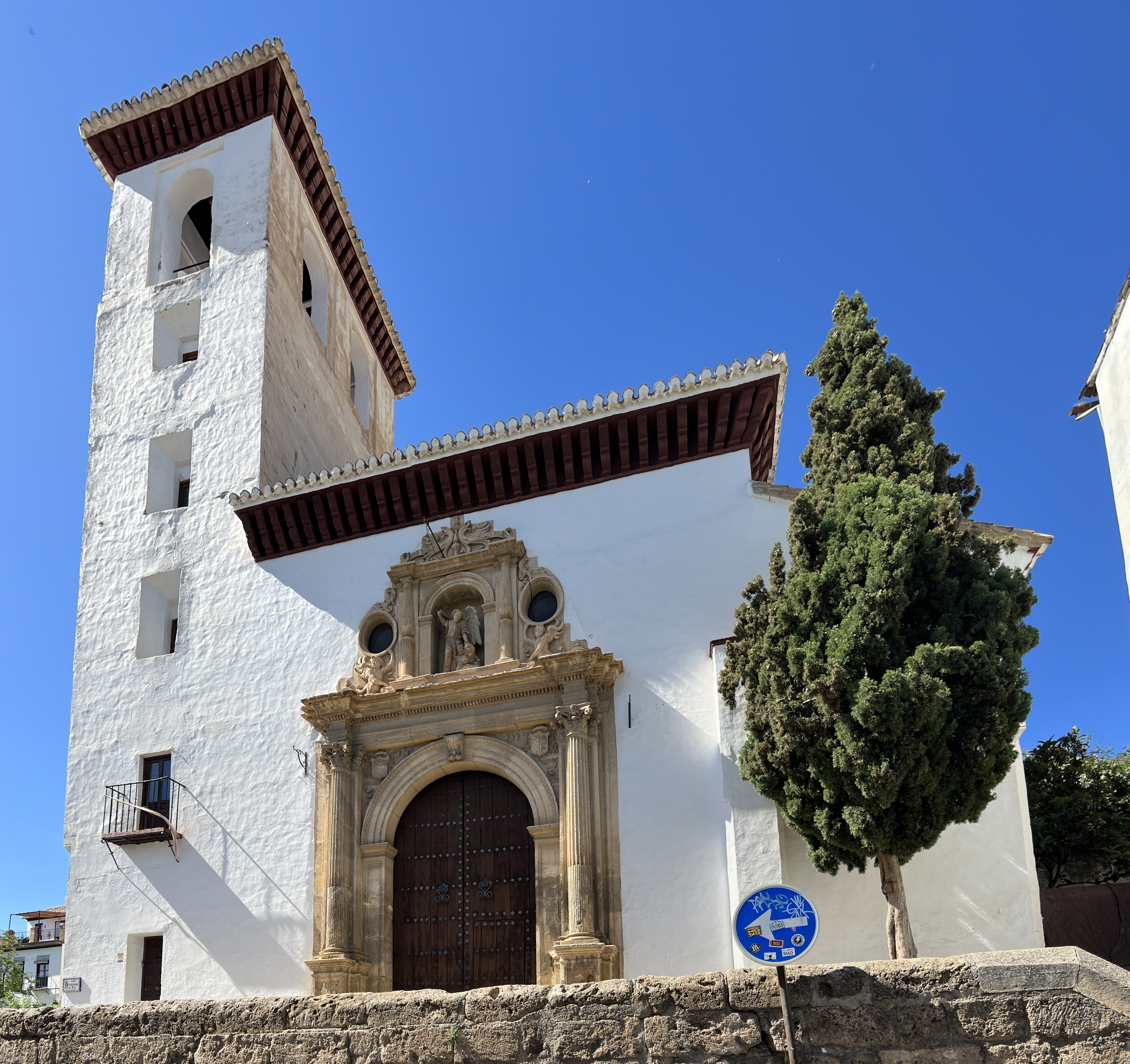
- Church exterior, with entrance portal and bell tower

- Location in Andalusia

Religion
- Affiliation: Catholic

Location
- Location: Albaicín, Granada, Spain
- Coordinates: 37.181656°N 3.595314°W

Architecture
- Type: Church
- Style: Mudéjar, Renaissance
- Established: 1501
- Groundbreaking: 1528
- Completed: 1577

The Church of Santa María de la Aurora y San Miguel (Spanish: Iglesia de La Aurora y San Miguel Bajo) is a church and historic monument in Granada, Spain. The church is located in the historic Albaicín neighbourhood, at Placeta de San Miguel Bajo. It was built in the 16th century on the site of the neighbourhood's former main mosque and incorporates an element of its remains.

== History ==
The area of Placeta de San Miguel Bajo (Note: The name distinguishes the area, and the church, from San Miguel Alto, located on a hill at the northern end of the Albaicín.) formed the site of the al-Qaṣaba al-Qadīma palace complex of the Zirid emir Badis. The complex, which was later displaced by the Alhambra under the Nasrid dynasty, comprised a number of buildings, of which the Dar al-Horra palace is the most complete remaining example. (Note: The Dar al-Horra was the home of Aixa, mother of Muhammad XI of Granada the last Nasrid ruler in Spain.) These included a mosque on the site of the present church. The mosque's original cistern, dating from the 13th century remains, embedded in the façade of the church facing the square. Other elements of the cistern are even older, Roman columns have been reused as carrying shafts.

After the conquest of Granada in 1492 by the Catholic Monarchs of Spain the building continued as a mosque, serving the Mudéjar population of the city. It became a parish church in 1501 after the forced conversions that followed the Rebellion of the Alpujarras and the creation of 23 new parishes, under the direction of Cardinal Francisco Jiménez de Cisneros, archbishop of Toledo and primate of Spain. In the following 20 years, the mosque was completely destroyed, with the exception of the cistern, and replaced by a Catholic church, with building taking place in two stages between 1528 and 1577.

The church closed in 1842 due to falling congregations, and many of its interior fittings were removed. It reopened in the 21st century as the headquarters of the brotherhood, La Aurora - Penitencia del Albayzín. The baroque Cross of Christ which stands in the square was originally located adjacent to the church, but was relocated to the opposite side of the square following the Spanish Civil War. The church holds a Sunday mass and is open to the public for limited hours on Fridays, Saturdays and Sundays. The tower gives views of the city. In August 2026, part of the cornice of the church tower became detached and fell into the square during the Andalusian eartquakes.

== Architecture ==
The church is constructed of brick and stone, faced in white plaster. The bell tower echoes the minaret of the original mosque. The entrance façades have been attributed to Diego Siloe (c. 1495–1563), creator of the Granadan school of sculpture. (Note: Siloe came to Granada in 1528, and remained in the city until his death working on Granada Cathedral and the Monastery of St Jerome.) There are two doorways, both with elaborate doorcases; the one facing the square has Corninthian pilasters, while that facing the entrance street is more Renaissance in style.

The church has a single nave, about 40 metres long and 20 meters wide, and the two stages of development are visible. The first section, completed 1528-1539 is Mudéjar in style, and attributed by Agencia Albaicín to a builder, Antonio Fernández, and a carpenter Gil Martín. It is notable for its wooden ceilings. A second building period took place between 1551 and 1557. This follows a more Renaissance style associated with the contemporary El Escorial.

== Gallery ==
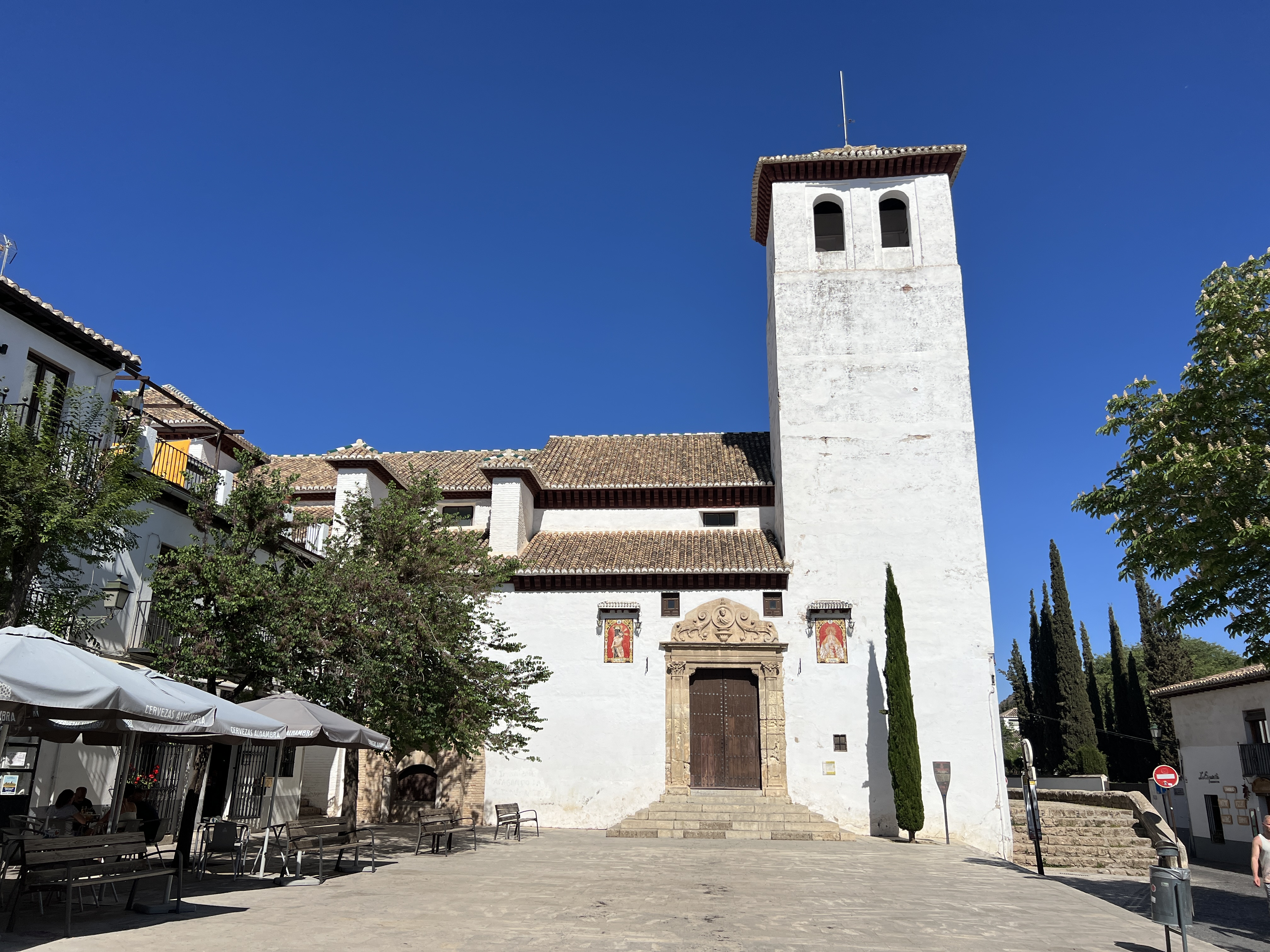
Façade facing the square

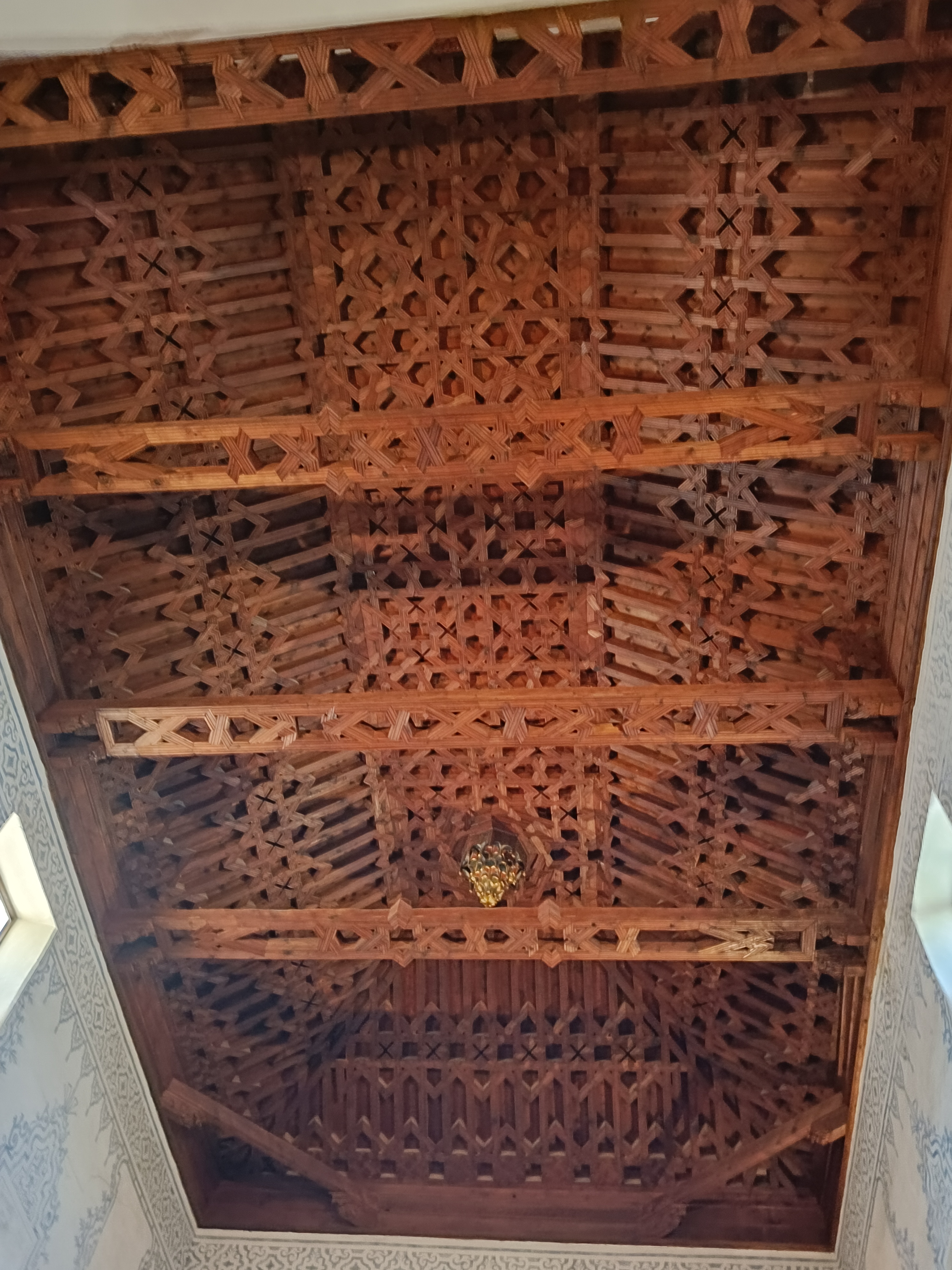
Mudéjar roof

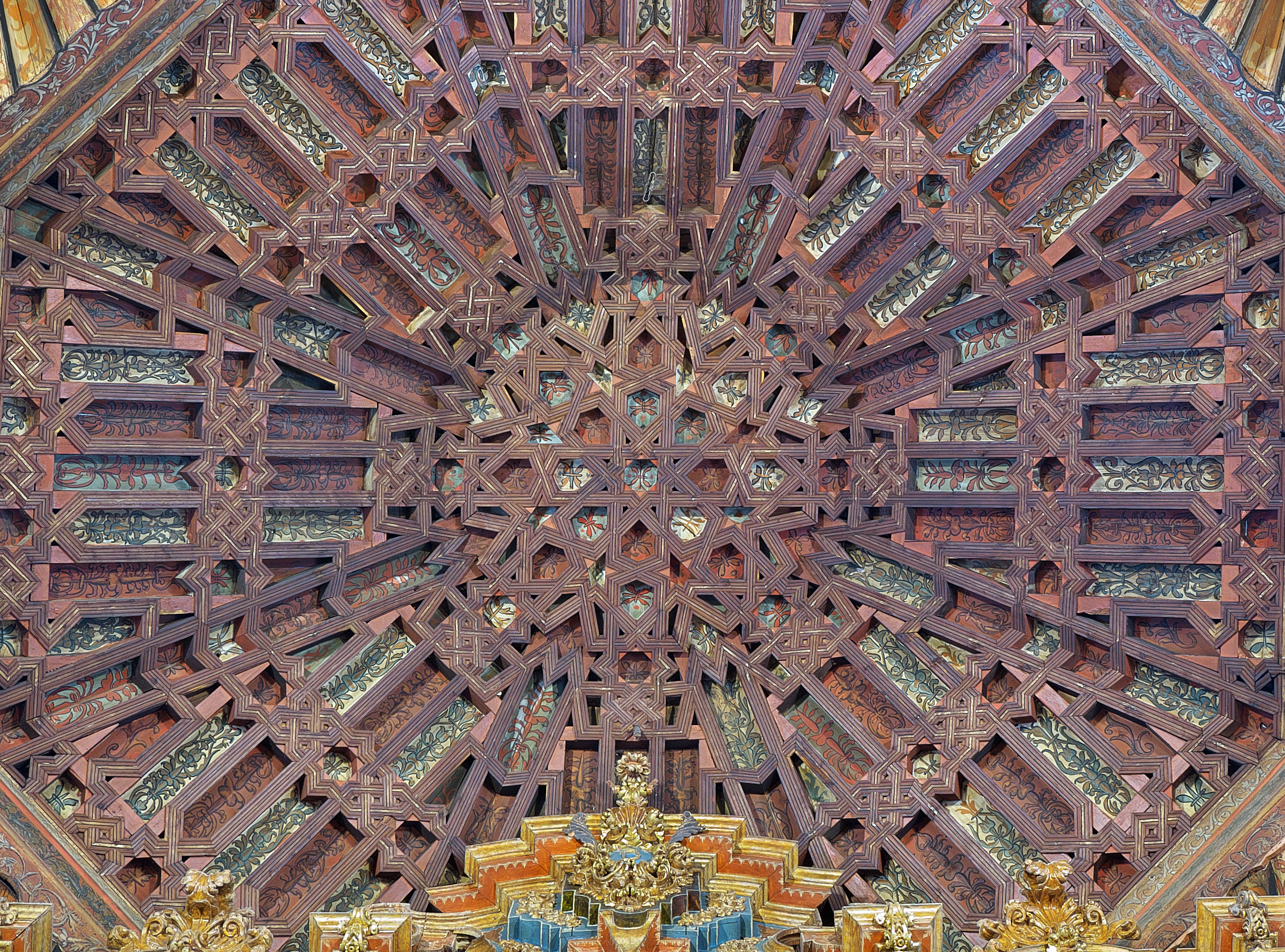
Roof detail

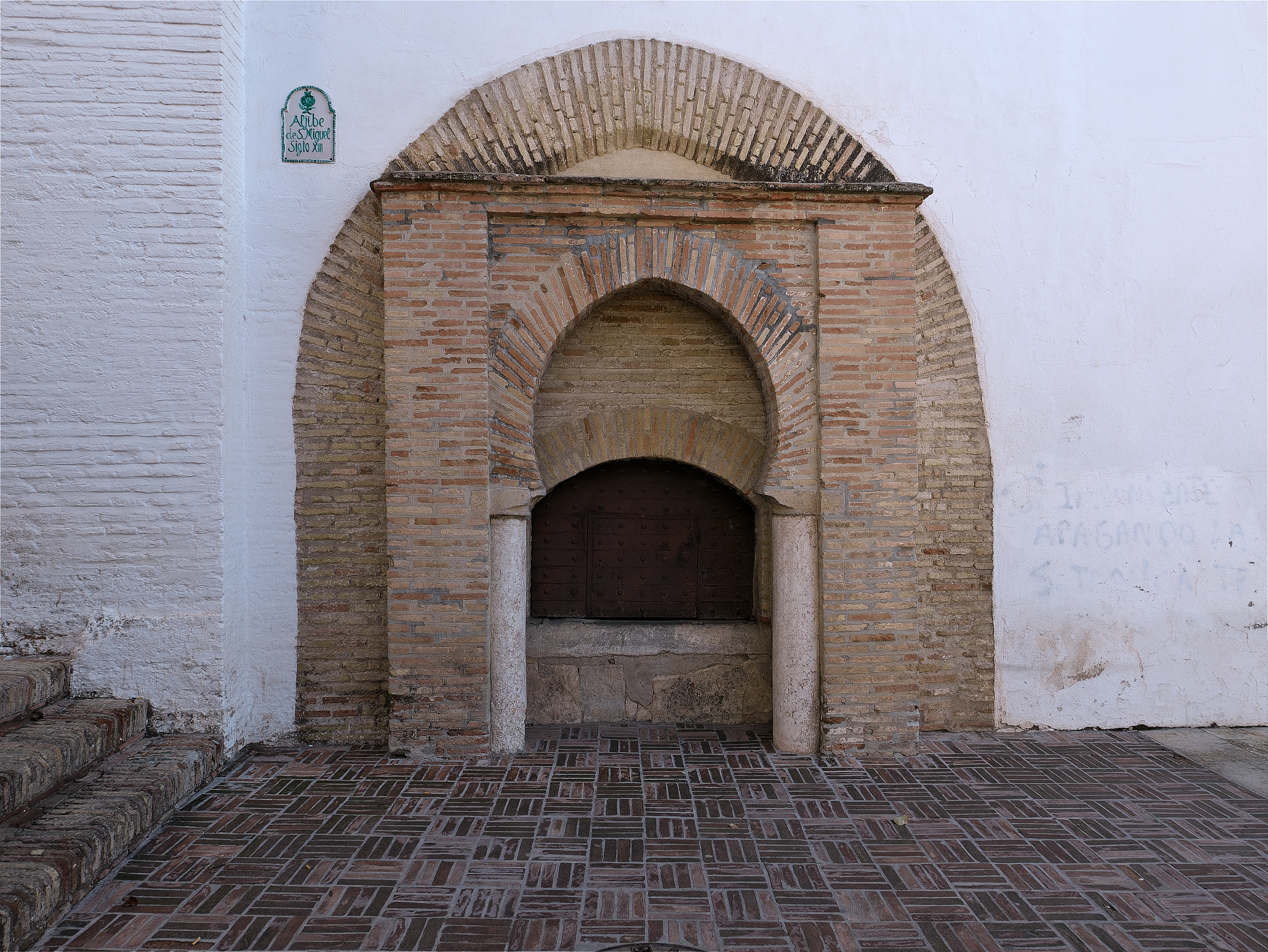
The alfiz, the exterior opening of the cistern
