= Dar al-Horra =

Coordinates: 37°10′53.4″N 3°35′46.7″W

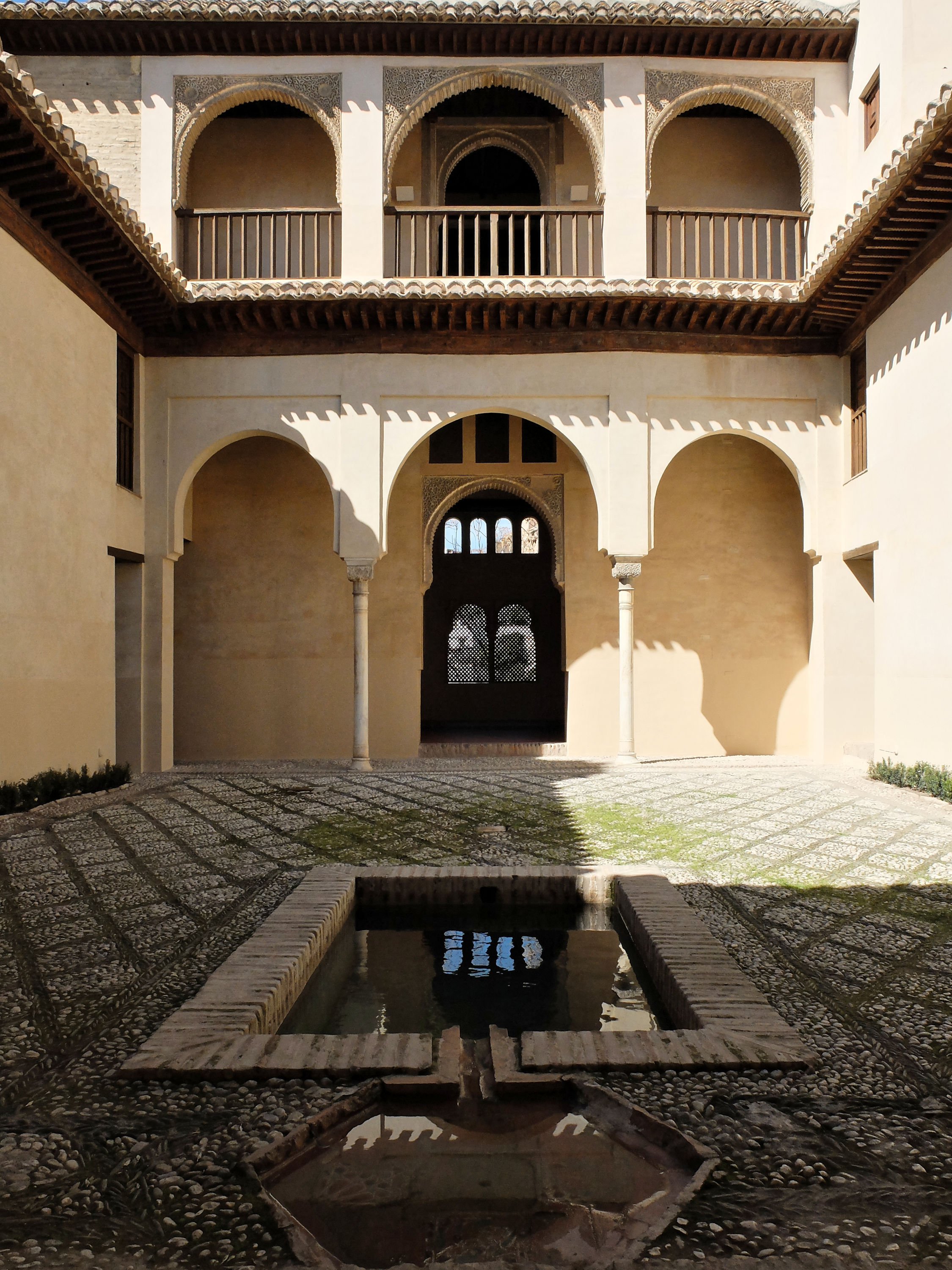
The main courtyard of the building

Dar al-Horra (Arabic: دار الحرة, romanized: Dār al-Ḥurra; Spanish: Palacio de Dar al-Horra) is a former 15th-century Nasrid palace located in the Albaicín quarter of Granada, Spain. Since the early 16th century it was used as part of the Monastery of Santa Isabel la Real. It is now a historic monument.

== History ==
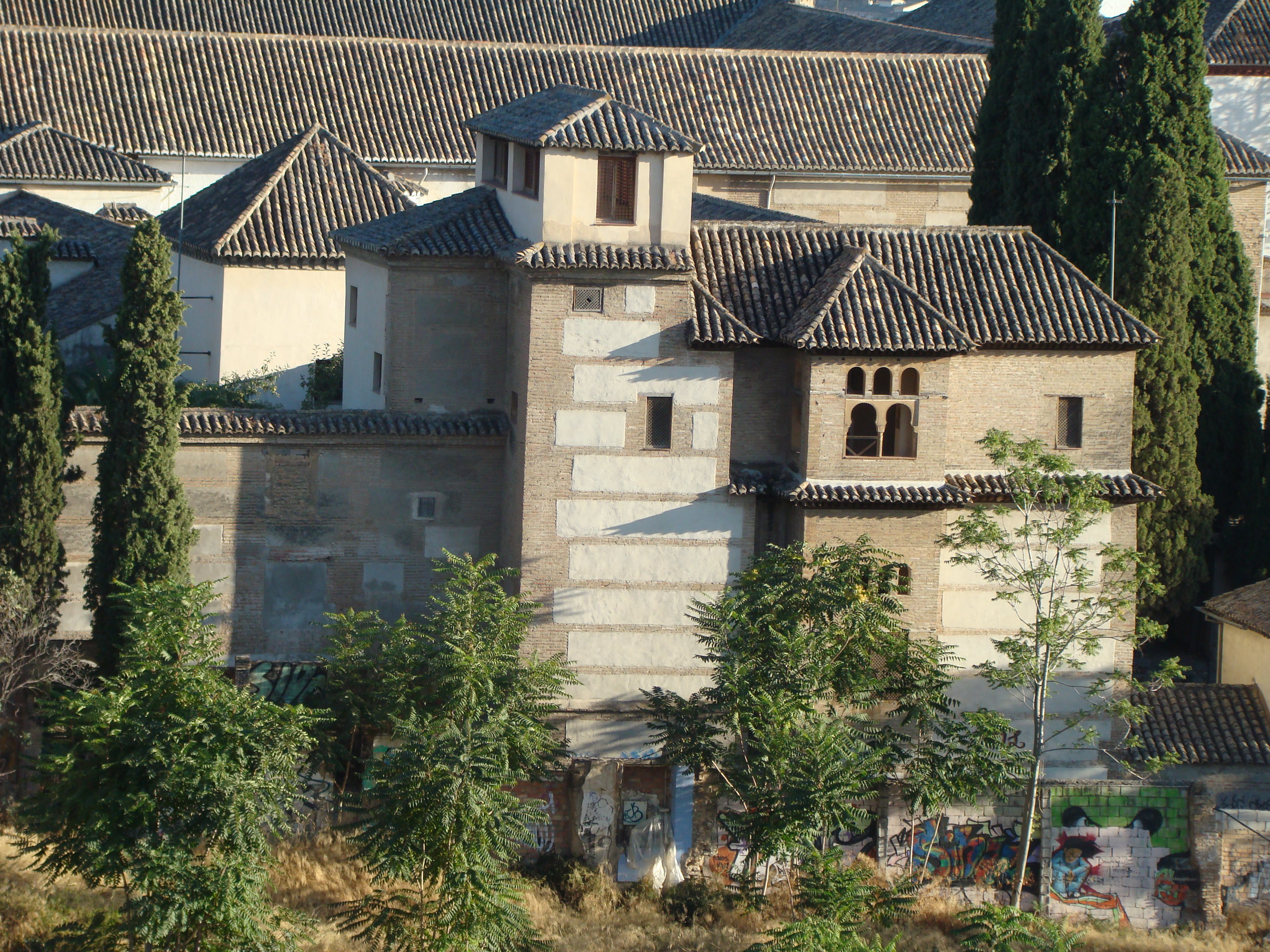
View of the Dar al-Horra on the hilltop of the Albaicin

The palace is dated to the 15th century when Granada was the capital of the last Muslim Emirate on the Iberian Peninsula, under the leadership of the Nasrid dynasty. It was probably built under the reign of Yusuf III (1408–1417). Near the end of the dynasty, the palace was used as a residence by Aisha al-Horra (or Aixa), the wife of Sultan Abu'l-Hasan Ali (also known as "Muley Hacén"; ruled 1464–1482 and 1483–1485) and mother of the last Nasrid sultan, Muhammad XI (also known as "Boabdil"; ruled 1482–1483 and 1487–1492). The name "Dar al-Horra" ("House of the Free Woman") comes from this association. The palace is located atop the hill of the Albaicin neighbourhood, which was formerly the site of the Alcazaba al-Qadima, the former palace and citadel of the Zirid rulers during the period of the Taifa kingdoms in the 11th century. There is some suggestion that the palace was originally part of the Zirid palace, but this has not been substantiated with evidence.

After the fall of Granada to Spain and the end of the Reconquista in 1492, the property was given to Hernando de Zafra, secretary of the Catholic Monarchs, who used it as his residence. In 1493 the palace was the venue for several agreements signed between the Catholic Monarchs and the remaining Muslim nobility, whereby the latter left for Morocco. In 1507 the palace was converted by Queen Isabel into a Franciscan convent for nuns, as part of the Monastery of Santa Isabel la Real.

== Architecture ==
The palace demonstrates many of the typical characteristics of Nasrid and Moorish architecture. The two-story building is arranged around a central rectangular courtyard with a small pool. This enclosed courtyard arrangement suited its later use as a cloister for nuns, which contributed to its subsequent good state of preservation. The main rooms of the building are located behind a two-story portico on the north side of the courtyard and a one-story portico on the south side. Some of the rooms and hallways contain some limited but well-preserved remains of Nasrid-era decoration in carved stucco. On the southern side of the courtyard is a large chamber which was used as a chapel after the Reconquista until the later Church of Santa Isabel la Real was built nearby. On the north side are several rooms over two floors. On the middle axis of the building, on both floors, is a room that projects outward from the rest of the building, acting as a mirador (lookout). The upper floor offers views over the 11th-century Zirid walls and to the neighbourhoods beyond to the north. On the northeast corner of the building is a tower-like section which rises to a third floor.

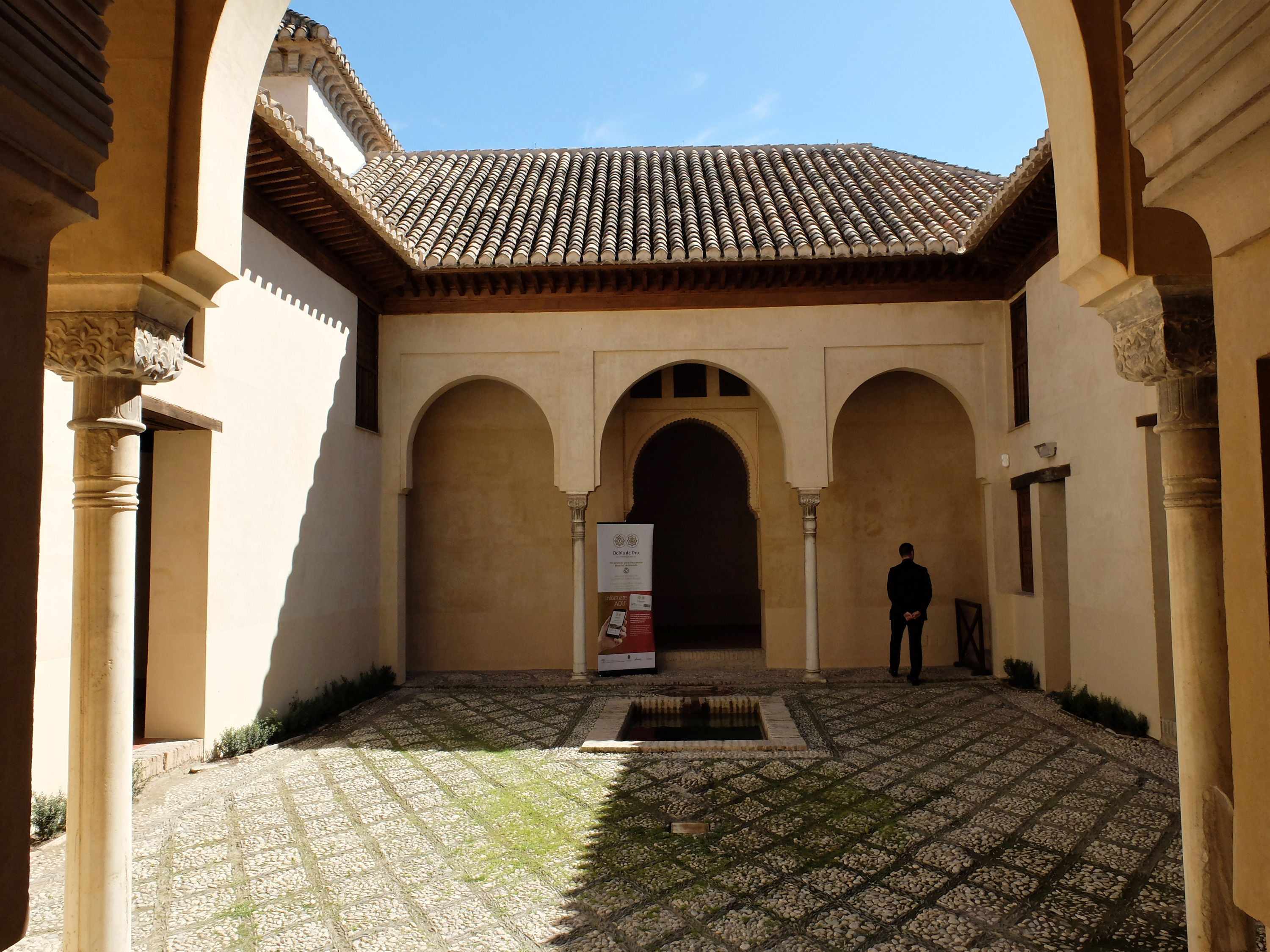
The main courtyard, looking south

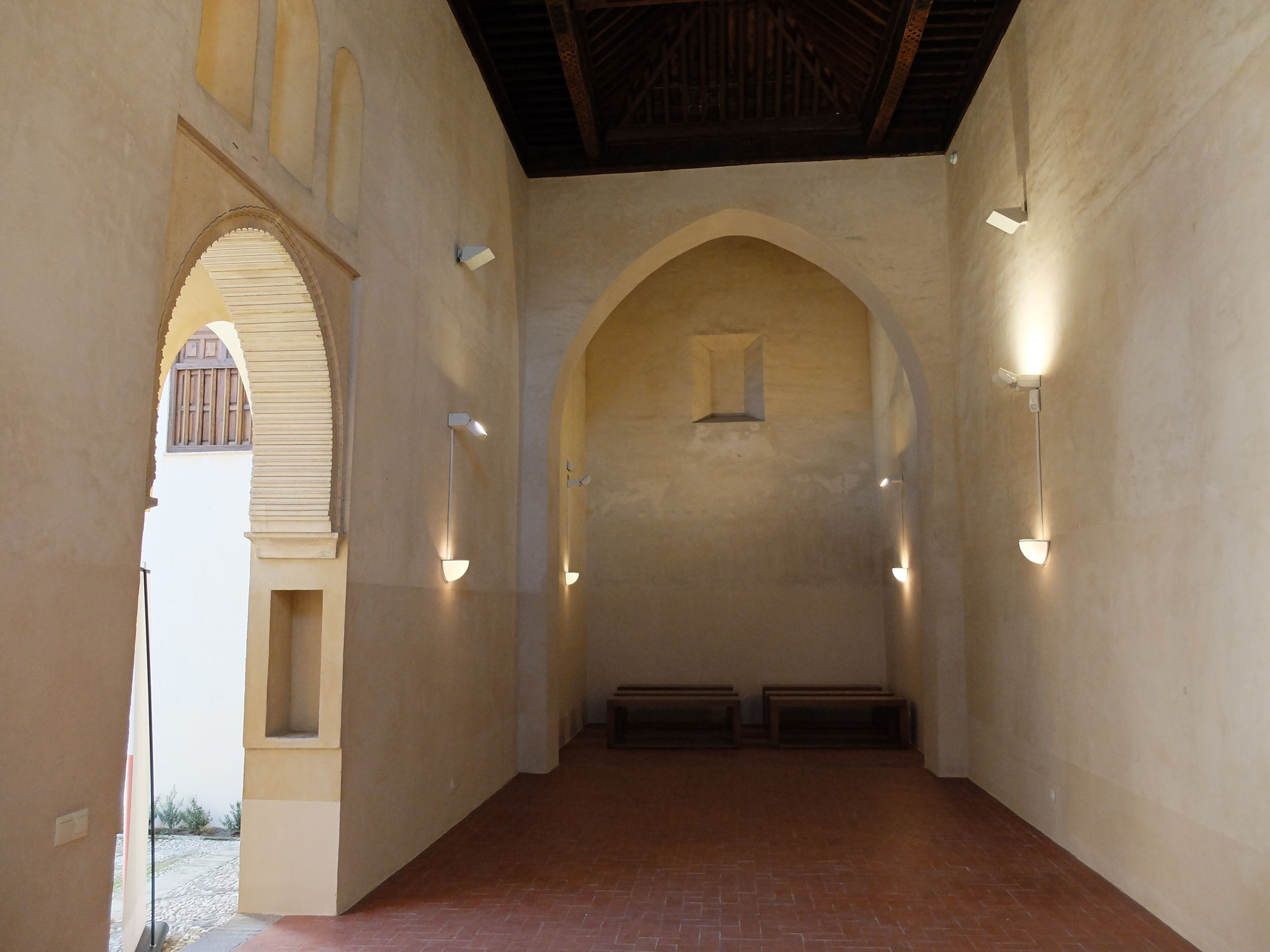
The southern chamber

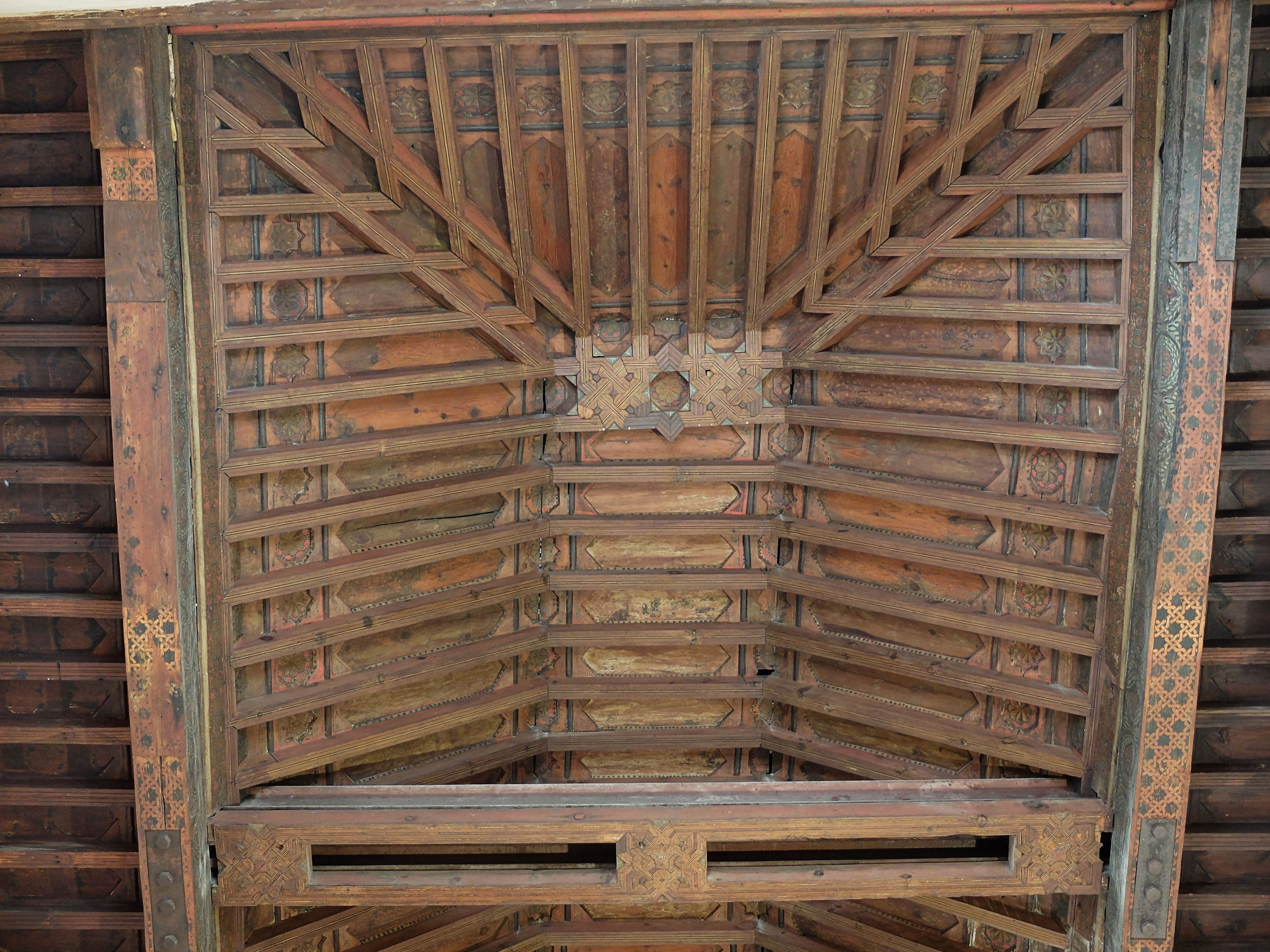
The wooden ceiling (with some painted and carved ornamentation) of the southern chamber

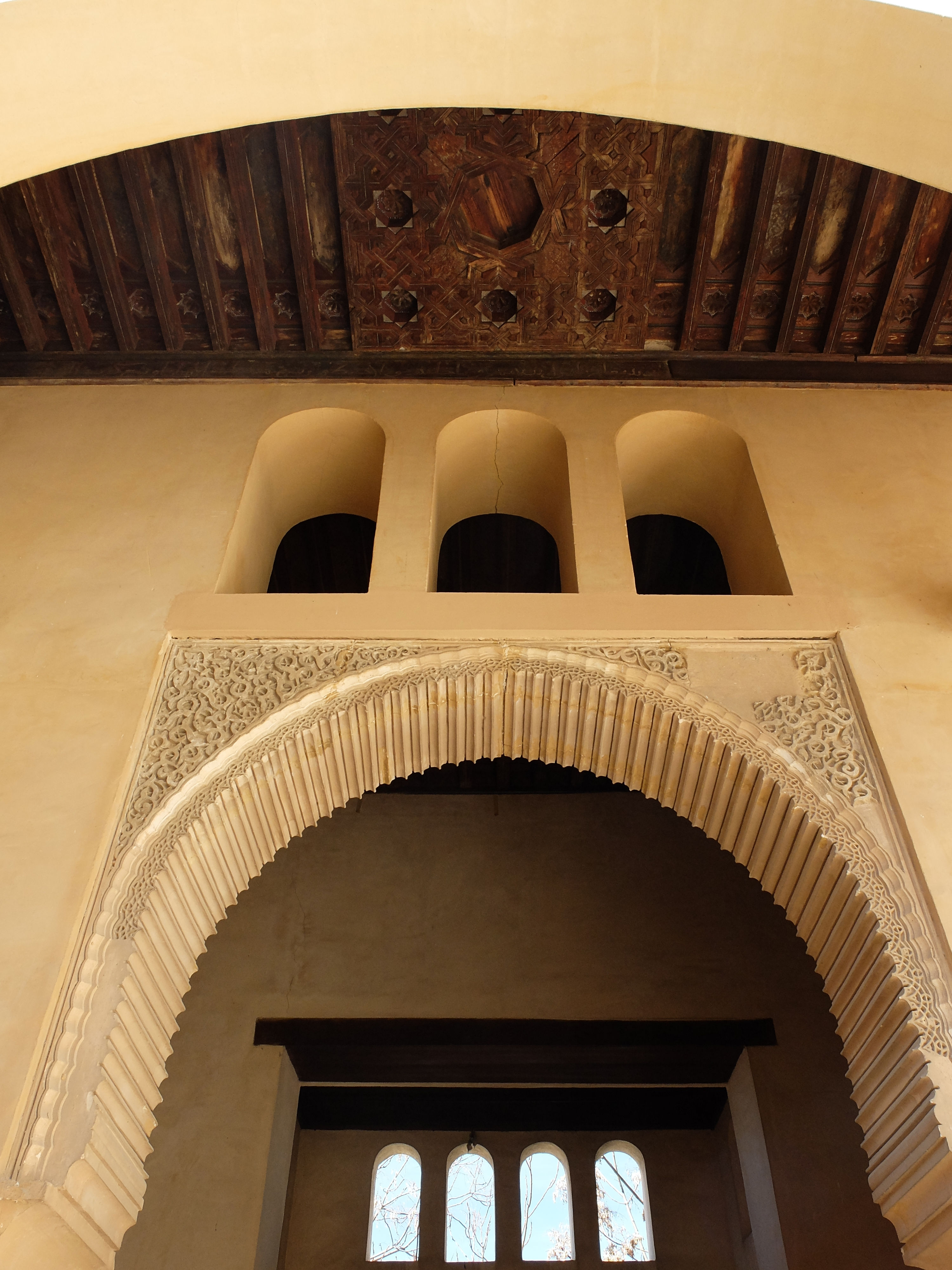
Entrance to the rooms off the northern side of the courtyard

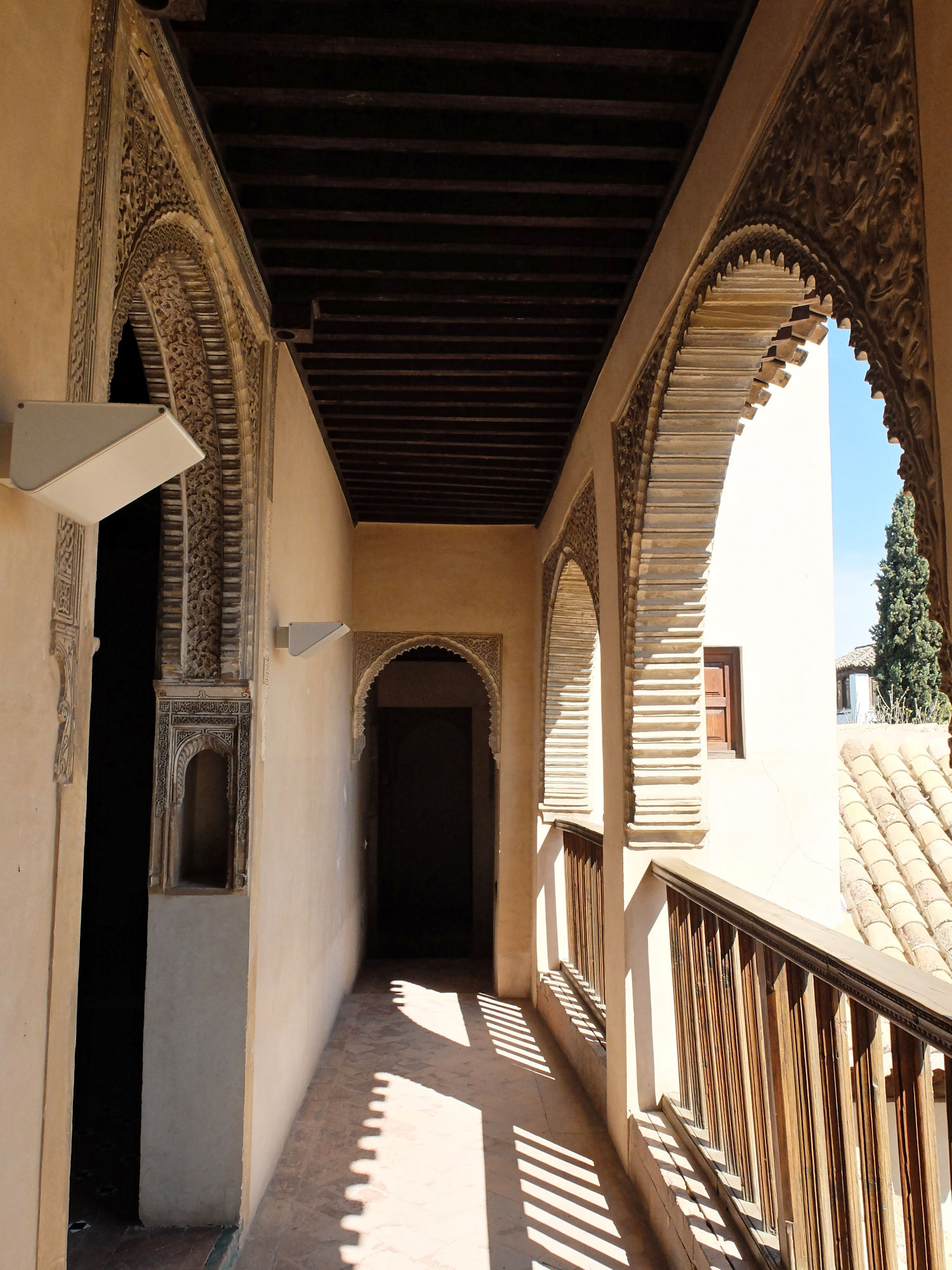
Balcony and arches on the second floor of the northern side

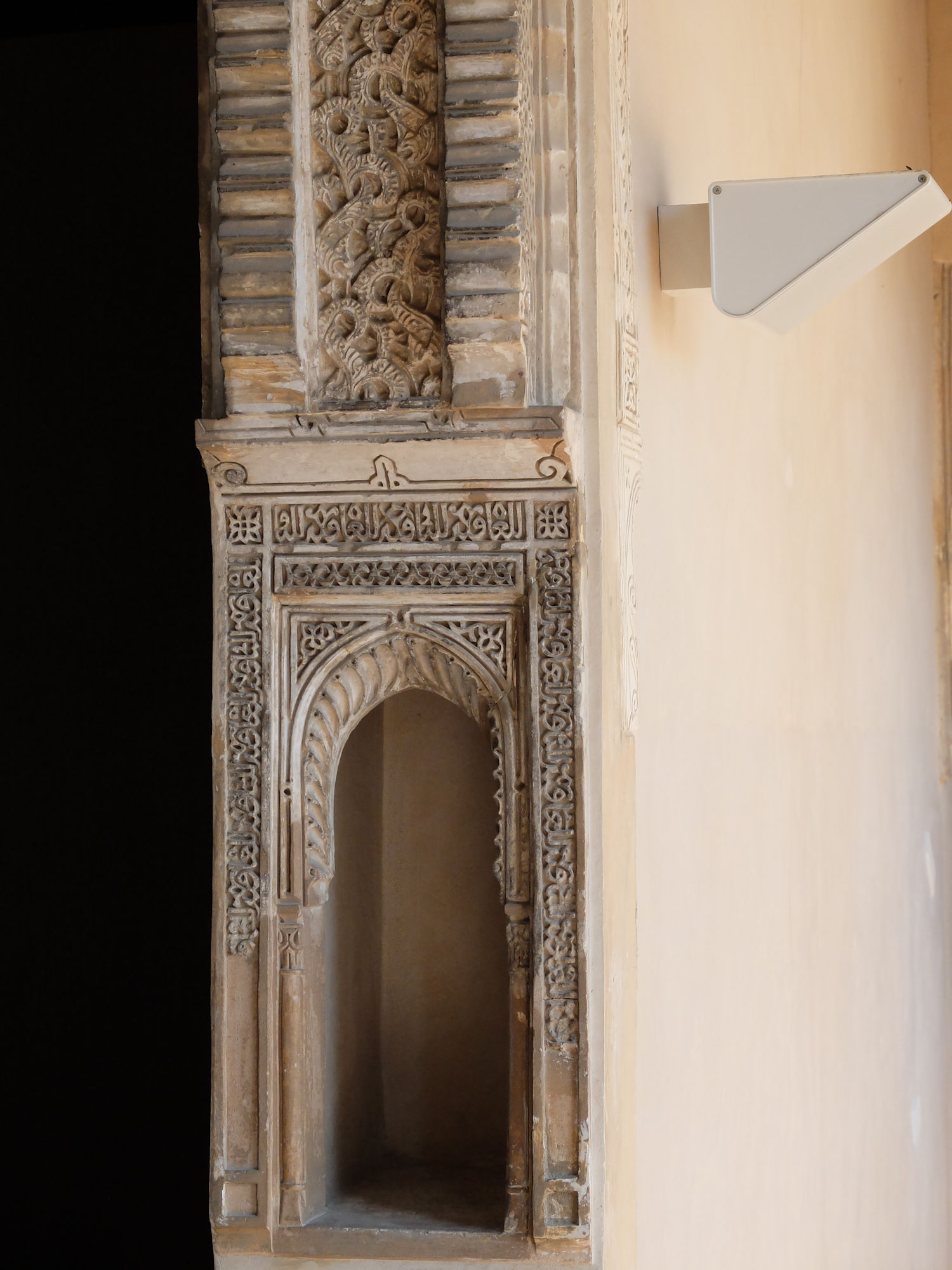
Nasrid-era stucco decoration and ornamental niche

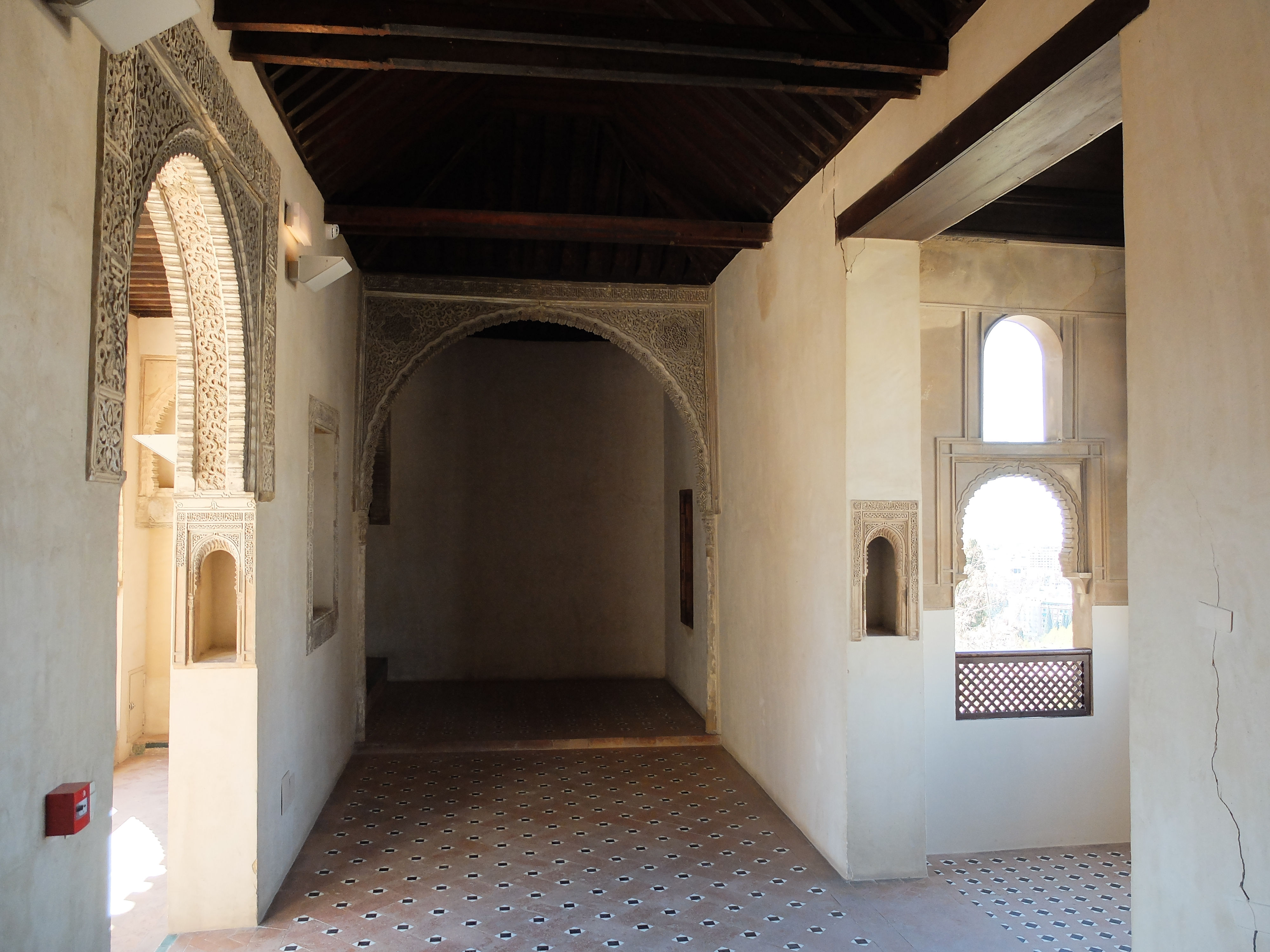
Rooms on the second floor of the northern side

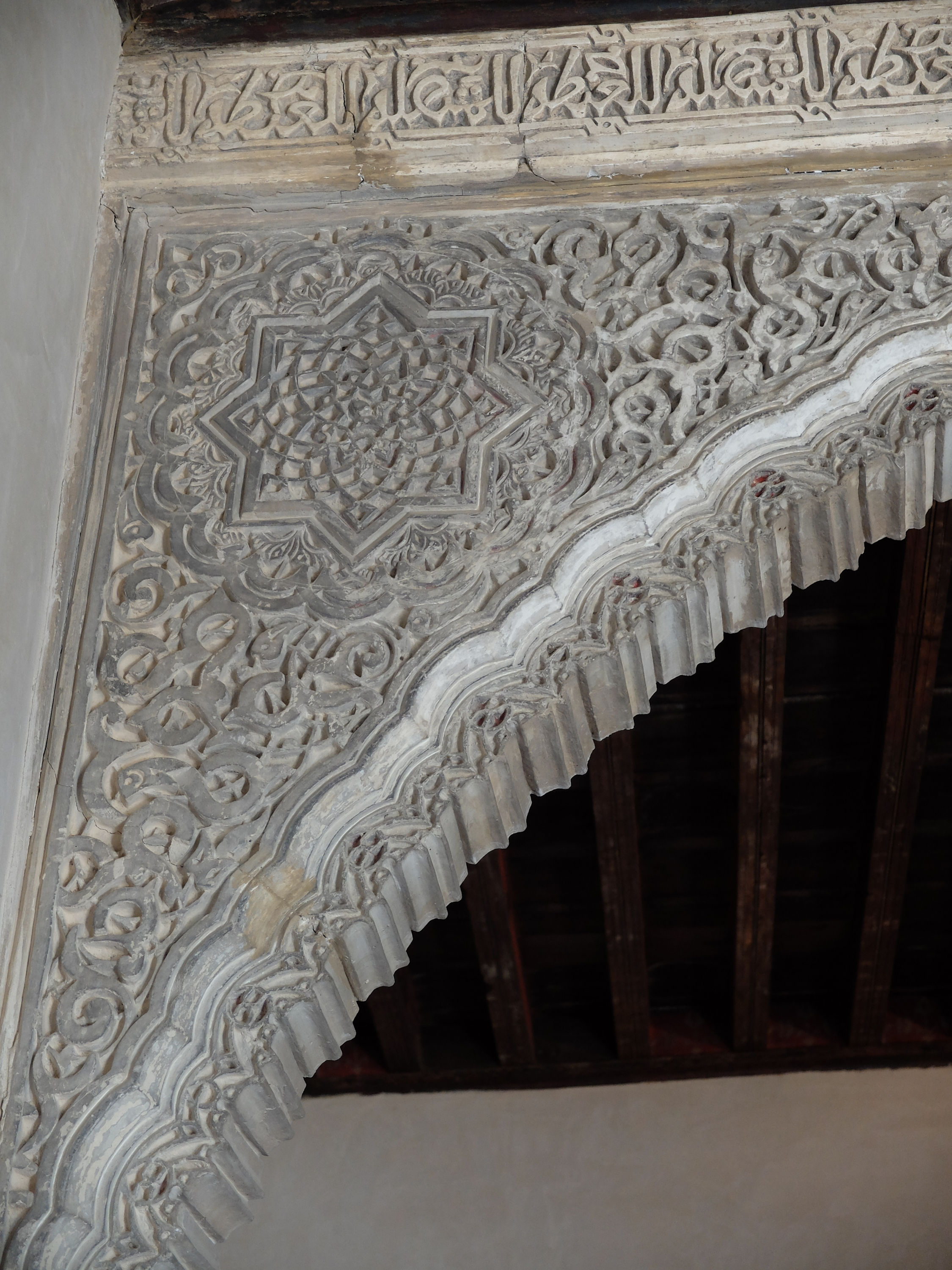
Nasrid-era stucco decoration in the northern rooms

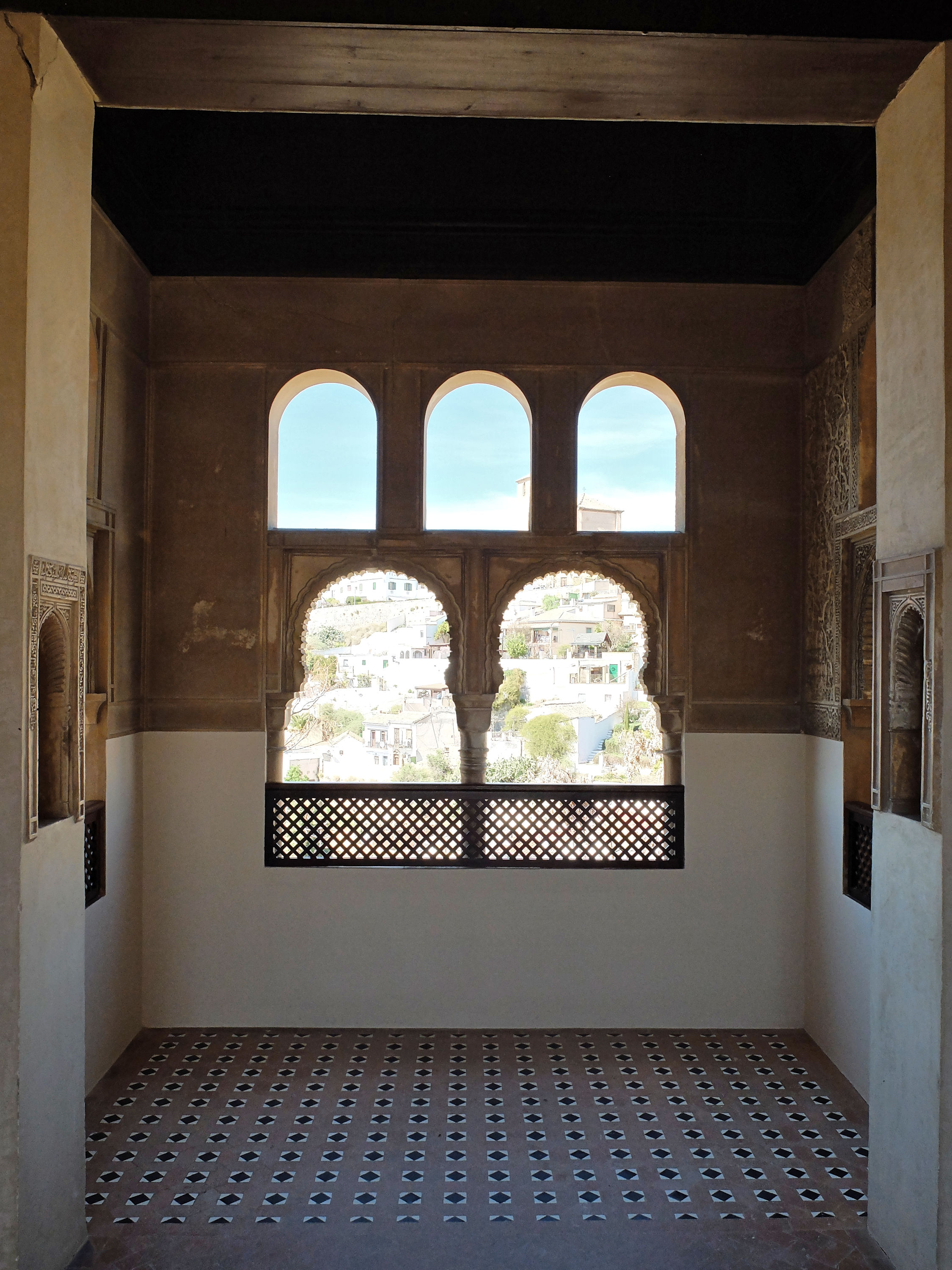
The upper-floor mirador (lookout) room

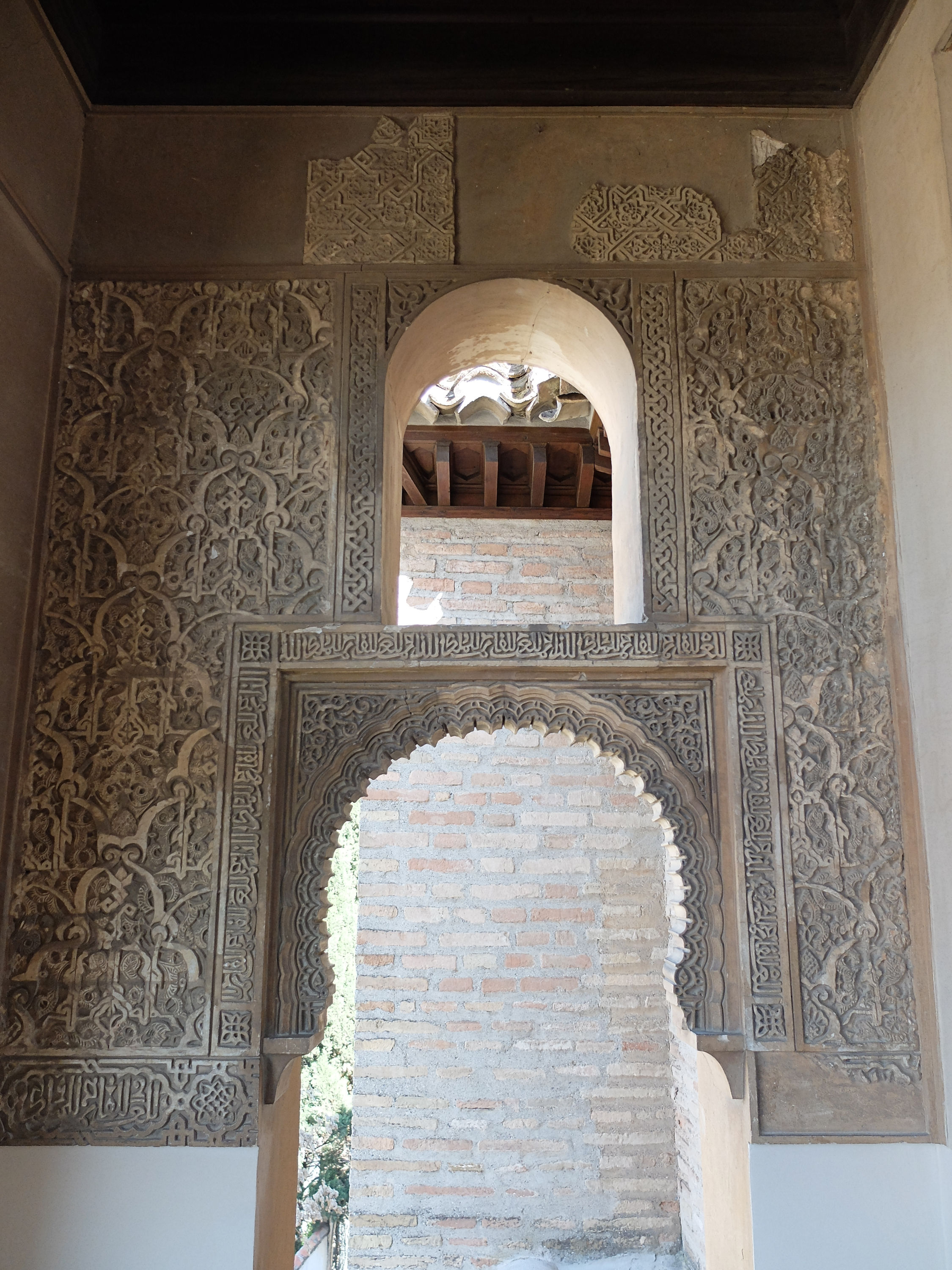
Remains of stucco-carved decoration in the upper-floor mirador (lookout) room
