= Council of Ten (Almohad) =

Almohad governing body

The Council of Ten (Arabic: مجلس العشرة or أهل الجماعة) or The Companions of the Mahdi (Arabic: اصحاب المهدي) was a group of Ibn Tumart's earliest and closest disciples at the top of the hierarchy of the Almohad movement. Its name evoked an image of the Prophet Muhammad's ten companions, though sources indicate that "ten" was more of a name than a fixed number of members. The status of members of the Council of Ten was based on adherence to Almohad doctrine and proximity to Ibn Tumart rather than tribal origin. Members of the Council of Ten were appointed as governors and given military responsibilities from the conquest of Marrakesh in 1147 until 1157, when 'Abd al-Mu'min started appointing his heirs.

== Composition ==
The few primary sources describing the composition of the Council of Ten include the anonymous Kitāb al-Ansāb (كتاب الأنساب في معرفة الأصحاب) and Ibn al-Qattan's Nuẓm al-Jumān (نظم الجمان لترتيب ما سلف من أخبار الزمان). The Almohad chronicler al-Baydhaq also wrote about the members of the council in his book Al-Muqtabas min Kitab al-Ansab fi Ma'arifat al-Ashab.

The Council members were from mostly Masmuda tribes, including the tribal chief Abu Hafs 'Umar al-Hintati of the Masmuda. Two others were adopted into the Masmuda, including 'Abd al-Mu'min, who was also adopted into the Masmuda tribal confederation Hargha.

The following men were known to be members of the Council.

- Abu Muhamed Abd al-Mu'min ibn Ali was adopted into the Masmuda tribal confederation Hargha by Ibn Tumart and became the first Almohad caliph.
- Abu Hafs Omar ibn Ali al-Senhaji was from the Senahja / Iznagen faction of the Masmuda tribal confederation Ahl Tinmel and is known by the Almohads as Omar Aznag. His first name is Ymluk, and he was one of the first to support Ibn Tumart, hastening to pledge allegiance to him and spread his message, thereby becoming one of the Council of Ten. He was appointed as a minister by Ibn Tumart, and when Ibn Tumart died he was one of the three who pledged allegiance to Ibn Tumart' successor Abd al-Mumin ibn Ali. To honor him because he was of a higher status among the Almohad, 'Abd al-Mu'min removed him from the ministries. He died in the year 536 AH and his sons had great positions under 'Abd al-Mu'minn, being the first to participate in the public parade of the Almohads.
- Abu Al Rabi' Sulayman ibn Makhlouf al-Hadari was known as ibn Baqal and ibn Ta'thembiybt among the people of Aghmat, and as Sulayman Ahari among the Almohads.
- Abu Ibrahim Ismail ibn Yslal al-Hazraji was from the Masmuda tribal confederation of Hazraja. He was also known as Ismail Igig and was a student of Mahdi ibn Tumert in Aghmat Ourika. He hastened to pledge allegiance to him when he began to organize his movement and thus became one of the Council of Ten. Al-Mahdi appointed him as a judge and made him the commander of Hargha in his fourth campaign, and he was one of those who pledged allegiance to 'Abd al-Mu'min ibn Ali after Al-Mahdi's death in 524 AH. He participated in both undermining the Almoravid state and securing the Almohad state, taking charge of suppressing the rebellion against 'Abd al-Mu'min in Sefrou. He is considered a first-class fedayeen as he saved Al-Mahdi ibn Tumart from a plot to assassinate him, and also saved 'Abd al-Mu'min.
- Abu Imran Moussa ibn Temara al-Gedmiwi was from the Masmuda tribal confederation Gedmiwa. He was especially trusted by Al-Mahdi, but died in the Battle of al-Buhayrah in the year 1130 AD. Two of his brothers were Almohad shaykhs in the council of the fifty.
- Abu Yahya Abubaker ibn Yiggit al-Hintati was from the Masmuda tribal confederation Hintata. He died in the Battle of Buhayrah in the year 1130 AD, and had a son whom 'Abd al-Mu'min appointed as the governor of Cordoba in the year 549 AH.
- Abu Abdellah Muhamed ibn Sliman al-Meskali al-Tinmellali was from the Meskala faction of the Masmuda tribal confederation Ahl Tinmel, and died in the Battle of al-Buhayrah in 1130 AD.
- Abdullah ibn Ya'la or Ya'laten al-Tazi al-Zenati, known as ibn Moulouya, was a scholar in the third Mehdi's expedition and a leader of the Genfisa tribe. He abandoned the Almohad doctrine of Ibn Tumart after the latter's death and joined Ali bin Yusuf, the Sultan of the Almoravids, the first time Ibn Tumart was affected by a rebellion against the Almohad. The Masmuda tribe of Genfisa killed Abdullah ibn Yaala Zenati in Tinmel by crucifiying him, and Abd Al-Mumin thanked the Genfisa for their action.
- Abu Muhamed Abdullah ibn Muhsin al-Wansharisi was adopted into the Masmuda tribal confederation Hargha by Ibn Tumart and died in the Battle of al-Buhayrah in 1130 AD.
- Abu Hafs Omar ibn Yahya al-Hintati was from the Masmuda tribal confederation Hintata. He is also known as Omar Ynti or Omar u Mzal, for although his original name was Faska u Mzal Ynti, al-Mahdi Ibn Tumart named him Omar. He was the Shaykh of the Hintata tribe and the grandfather of the Banu Hafs, the kings of the Almohads in Tunisia (Hafsids). He was one of the closest aides of al-Mahdi ibn Tumart and one of those who pledged allegiance to 'Abd al-Mu'min. Abu Hafs was a great leader among the Almohad leaders and conquered many lands in Andalusia, including Algeciras, Ronda, Seville, Cordoba, and Granada. He participated in suppressing the revolution of Muhammad bin Abdullah bin Hud Al-Masi, but died in the sweeping plague that struck Morocco and Andalusia in the year 571 AH.
- Abu Moussa Isa ibn Moussa al-Mzoudi was from the Mzouda faction of the Masmuda tribal confederation of Gedmiwa.
- Abu Muhamed Abdelaziz al-Ghighayi was from the Ghighaya faction of the Masmuda tribal confederation of Hintata, and was also in the Ahl Dar of al-Mahdi ibn Tumart. In the year 529 AH, 'Abd al-Mu'min sent him to the Banu Yighaz clan of the Hintata to spread a message, but they killed him treacherously. When the news of his death reached 'Abd al-Mu'min he moved to Ashfshad, the town of the Banu Yighaz, who plotted to assassinate him. But he escaped due to his vigilance and caution, staying in the town for forty days until the Banu Yighaz were defeated by the Almohads, and then returning to Tinmel.
