= Abu Hafs Umar ibn Yahya al-Hintati =

Hintata tribal chief (1090–1175/6)

Abū Ḥafṣ ʿUmar b. Yaḥyā al-Hintātī (Arabic: أبو حفص عمر بن يحيى الهنتاتي, born Faskāt ū-Mzāl Īntī; c. 482–571 Hijri / 1090–1175 or 1176), chief of the Hintata, was a close companion of Ibn Tumart and a shaper of the Almohad Empire greatly responsible for the unification of the Almohad corps. His grandson Abū Zakariyyāʾ Yahyā b. ʿAbd al-Waḥīd founded the Hafsid dynasty in Ifriqiya. He lived a long life and helped maintain ties between the Almohad movement's early revolutionary doctrine and its later dynastic period established by ʿAbd al-Muʾmin.

Abu Hafs's original Berber name was "Faskat u-Mzal Inti", but he was renamed "Abu Hafs" by Ibn Tumart, choosing a name associated with one of the Islamic prophet Muhammad's companions.

Abū Ḥafṣ led the Hintata tribe of the central Moroccan High Atlas, and mobilized his soldiers to fight against the Almoravids in support of the Almohads. Due to the necessity of unifying the tribes of the Atlas, and with Ibn Tumart's confidence, Abū Ḥafṣ led soldiers from his own tribe in battle, one of the few allowed to do so. Without this critical military support, it is unlikely that the Almohad offensive would have come together so quickly.

According to al-Baydhaq, Abū Ḥafṣ was a member of the Council of Ten, Ibn Tumart's closest advisors. Abū Ḥafṣ held a position just under ʿAbd al-Muʾmin in the Almohad hierarchy.
