= Almohad Caliphate =

1121–1269 Berber empire in North Africa and Iberia

Almohad Caliphate ٱلْمُوَحِّدُونَ (Arabic) al-Muwaḥḥidūn
- 1121–1269
- The Almohad empire at its greatest extent, c. 1180–1212
- Status: Caliphate
- Capital: Tinmel; (c. 1124–1147); Marrakesh; (1147–1269); In Al-Andalus: Seville; (1147–1162); Córdoba; (1162–1163); Seville; (1163–1248)
- Official languages: Arabic
- Common languages: Arabic, Mozarabic, Berber languages
- Religion: Sunni Islam (Almohadism); School: Zahiri; Creed: Ash’ari
- Demonym: Almohad
- Mahdi
  - 1121–1130: Ibn Tumart
- Caliph
  - 1130–1163 (first): Abd al-Mu'min
  - 1266–1269 (last): Idris al-Wathiq
- History
  - Established: 1121
  - Almoravids overthrown: 1147
  - Battle of Las Navas de Tolosa: 1212
  - Marinid suzerainty: 1248
  - Disestablished: 1269

Area
- 1150 est. (high-end estimate of peak area): 2,300,000 km^{2} (890,000 sq mi)
- 1200 est. (low-end estimate of peak area): 2,000,000 km^{2} (770,000 sq mi)
- Currency: Dinar
Preceded by
Almoravid dynasty
Hammadid kingdom
Second Taifas period
Khurasanid dynasty
Kingdom of Africa
Banu al-Rand
Banu Jami'
Banu Ghaniya
Succeeded by
Marinid Sultanate
Hafsid Sultanate
Kingdom of Tlemcen
Third Taifas period
Kingdom of Castile
Kingdom of Aragon
Kingdom of Majorca
Kingdom of Portugal
Kingdom of León
Emirate of Granada

The Almohad Caliphate (Note: /ˈælməhæd/; Arabic: خِلَافَةُ ٱلْمُوَحِّدِينَ or دَوْلَةُ ٱلْمُوَحِّدِينَ or ٱلدَّوْلَةُ ٱلْمُوَحِّدِيَّةُ, from Arabic: ٱلْمُوَحِّدُونَ, romanized: al-Muwaḥḥidūn, lit. 'those who profess the unity of God'.) or Almohad Empire was a North African Muslim empire ruled by a Berber dynasty from 1130 to 1269 (AH 524–667), which at its height controlled much of the Maghreb and the Iberian Peninsula (al-Andalus). The Spanish name "Almohads" derives from the Arabic al-Muwaḥḥidūn, "those who espouse Oneness", reflecting the dynasty's emphasis on divine unity and its protest against what it regarded as the lax character of prevailing Islam, particularly under the Almoravids.

The Almohad movement originated among the Masmuda Berbers under Ibn Tumart, who supplied its religious and ideological inspiration and was recognized by his followers as the Mahdi around 1121. He subsequently established a base at Tinmel in the Atlas Mountains. After Ibn Tumart's death, his successor Abd al-Mu'min (r. 1130–1163) founded the Almohad caliphate and its ruling Mu'minid dynasty and transformed the movement into a major territorial power. Under Abd al-Mu'min, the Almohads overthrew the Almoravids, captured Marrakesh in 1147, and established control over the western Maghreb. Abd al-Mu'min declared himself caliph. Their rule was extended across the Maghreb by 1159 and subsequently into Muslim Iberia. Muslim Spain had fallen under their control by about 1170–1172, and Seville served for a time as their principal centre in al-Andalus.

The Almohad period was marked by significant developments in philosophy and architecture. Among the major intellectual figures associated with the period were Ibn Ṭufayl, Ibn Rushd, and Ibn ʿArabī. A characteristic architectural form, the "Almohad arch", has been interpreted as a physical expression of the imagery of sūra 94 of the Qurʾān, in which God is described as relieving and expanding the burdened human condition. The former Almohad Great Mosque of Seville, of which the Giralda survives as part of the present cathedral, exemplifies this architectural conception.

The decisive turning point of Almohad power in Iberia came in 1212 (AH 609), when caliph Muhammad al-Nasir was defeated at the Battle of Las Navas de Tolosa by an alliance of forces from Castile, Aragon, and Navarre. The defeat initiated a prolonged decline in Almohad power in al-Andalus; Córdoba fell to Christian forces in 1236 and Seville in 1248. In North Africa, revolts by tribes and districts weakened Almohad authority and facilitated the rise of the Marinids from 1215. The last Almohad ruler, Idris al-Wathiq, was ultimately reduced to Marrakesh, where he was killed in 1269. The Marinids then seized the city, bringing Almohad rule in the western Maghreb to an end.

== History ==
=== Origins ===
The Almohad movement originated with Ibn Tumart, a member of the Masmuda, an Amazigh tribal confederation of the Atlas Mountains of southern Morocco. At the time, present-day Morocco, Mauritania, western Algeria and parts of Spain and Portugal (al-Andalus) were under the rule of the Almoravids, a Sanhaja Berber dynasty. Early in his life, Ibn Tumart went to Spain to pursue his studies, and thereafter to Baghdad to deepen them. In Baghdad, Ibn Tumart attached himself to the theological school of al-Ash'ari, and came under the influence of the teacher al-Ghazali. He soon developed his own system, combining the doctrines of various masters. Ibn Tumart's main principle was a strict unitarianism (tawhid), which denied the independent existence of the attributes of God as being incompatible with His unity, and therefore a polytheistic idea. Ibn Tumart represented a revolt against what he perceived as anthropomorphism in Muslim orthodoxy. His followers would become known as the al-Muwaḥḥidūn ("Almohads"), meaning those who affirm the unity of God.

After his return to the Maghreb c. 1117, Ibn Tumart spent some time in various Ifriqiyan cities, preaching and agitating, heading riotous attacks on wine-shops and on other manifestations of laxity. He laid the blame for the latitude on the ruling dynasty of the Almoravids, whom he accused of obscurantism and impiety. He also opposed their sponsorship of the Maliki school of jurisprudence, which drew upon consensus (ijma) and other sources beyond the Qur'an and Sunnah in their reasoning, an anathema to the stricter Zahirism favored by Ibn Tumart. His antics and fiery preaching led fed-up authorities to move him along from town to town. After being expelled from Bejaia, Ibn Tumart set up camp in Mellala, in the outskirts of the city, where he received his first disciples – notably, al-Bashir (who would become his chief strategist) and Abd al-Mu'min (a Zenata Berber of the Kumiya tribe who would later become his successor).

In 1120, Ibn Tumart and his small band of followers proceeded to Morocco, stopping first in Fez, where he briefly engaged the Maliki scholars of the city in debate. He even went so far as to assault the sister of the Almoravid emir Ali ibn Yusuf, in the streets of Fez, because she was going about unveiled, after the manner of Berber women. After being expelled from Fez, he went to Marrakesh, where he successfully tracked down the Almoravid emir Ali ibn Yusuf at a local mosque, and challenged the emir, and the leading scholars of the area, to a doctrinal debate. After the debate, the scholars concluded that Ibn Tumart's views were blasphemous and the man dangerous, and urged him to be put to death or imprisoned. But the emir decided merely to expel him from the city.

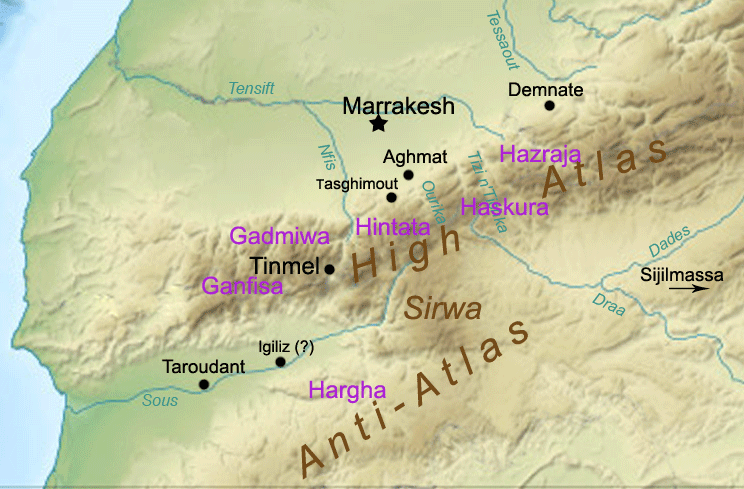
Approximate locations of the main Masmuda tribes that adhered to the Almohads

Ibn Tumart took refuge among his own people, the Hargha, in his home village of Igiliz (exact location uncertain), in the Sous valley. He retreated to a nearby cave, and lived out an ascetic lifestyle, coming out only to preach his program of puritan reform, attracting greater and greater crowds. At length, towards the end of Ramadan in late 1121, after a particularly moving sermon, reviewing his failure to persuade the Almoravids to reform by argument, Ibn Tumart 'revealed' himself as the true Mahdi, a divinely guided judge and lawgiver, and was recognized as such by his audience. This was effectively a declaration of war on the Almoravid state.

On the advice of one of his followers, Umar al-Hintati, a prominent chieftain of the Hintata, Ibn Tumart abandoned his cave in 1122 and went up into the High Atlas, to organize the Almohad movement among the highland Masmuda tribes. Besides his own tribe, the Hargha, Ibn Tumart secured the adherence of the Ganfisa, the Gadmiwa, the Hintata, the Haskura, and the Hazraja to the Almohad cause. Sometime around 1124, Ibn Tumart established his base at Tinmel, a highly defensible position in the valley of the Nfis in the High Atlas. Tinmal would serve both as the spiritual center and military headquarters of the Almohad movement. It became their dar al-hijra (roughly 'place of retreat'), emulating the story of the hijra (journey) of Muhammad's to Medina in the 7th century.

For the first eight years, the Almohad rebellion was limited to a guerilla war along the peaks and ravines of the High Atlas. Their principal damage was in rendering insecure (or altogether impassable) the roads and mountain passes south of Marrakesh – threatening the route to all-important Sijilmassa, the gateway of the trans-Saharan trade. Unable to send enough manpower through the narrow passes to dislodge the Almohad rebels from their easily defended mountain strong points, the Almoravid authorities reconciled themselves to setting up strongholds to confine them there (most famously the fortress of Tasghîmût that protected the approach to Aghmat, which was conquered by the Almohads in 1132), while exploring alternative routes through more easterly passes.

Ibn Tumart organized the Almohads as a commune, with a minutely detailed structure. At the core was the Ahl ad-dār ("House of the Mahdi"), composed of Ibn Tumart's family. This was supplemented by two councils: an inner Council of Ten, the Mahdi's privy council, composed of his earliest and closest companions; and the consultative Council of Fifty, composed of the leading sheikhs of the Masmuda tribes. The early preachers and missionaries (ṭalaba and huffāẓ) also had their representatives. Militarily, there was a strict hierarchy of units. The Hargha tribe coming first (although not strictly ethnic; it included many "honorary" or "adopted" tribesmen from other ethnicities, e.g. Abd al-Mu'min himself). This was followed by the men of Tinmel, then the other Masmuda tribes in order, and rounded off by the black fighters, the ʻabīd. Each unit had a strict internal hierarchy, headed by a mohtasib, and divided into two factions: one for the early adherents, another for the late adherents, each headed by a mizwar (or amzwaru); then came the sakkakin (treasurers), effectively the money-minters, tax-collectors, and bursars, then came the regular army (jund), then the religious corps – the muezzins, the hafidh and the hizb – followed by the archers, the conscripts, and the slaves. Ibn Tumart's closest companion and chief strategist, al-Bashir, took upon himself the role of "political commissar", enforcing doctrinal discipline among the Masmuda tribesmen, often with a heavy hand.

In early 1130, the Almohads finally descended from the mountains for their first sizeable attack in the lowlands. It was a disaster for their opponents. The Almohads swept aside an Almoravid column that had come out to meet them before Aghmat, and then chased their remnant all the way to Marrakesh. They laid siege to Marrakesh for forty days until, in April (or May) 1130, the Almoravids sallied from the city and crushed the Almohads in the bloody Battle of al-Buhayra (named after a large garden east of the city). The Almohads were thoroughly routed, with huge losses. Half their leadership was killed in action, and the survivors only just managed to scramble back to the mountains.

=== Caliphate and expansion ===
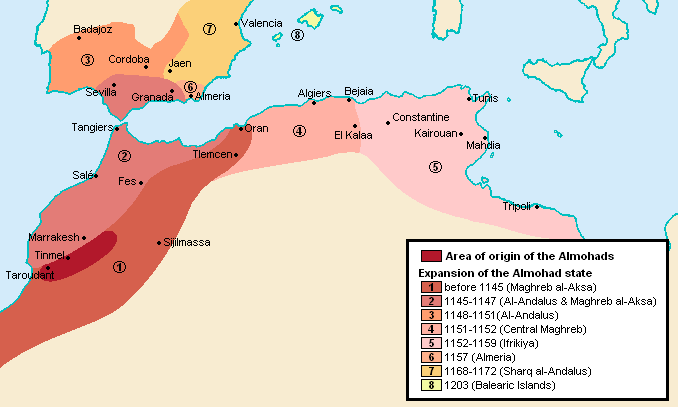
Phases of the expansion of the Almohad state

Ibn Tumart died shortly after, in August 1130. That the Almohad movement did not immediately collapse after such a devastating defeat and the death of their charismatic Mahdi, is likely due to the skills of his successor, Abd al-Mu'min. Ibn Tumart's death was kept a secret for three years, a period which Almohad chroniclers described as a ghayba or "occultation". This period likely gave Abd al-Mu'min time to secure his position as successor to the political leadership of the movement. Although a Zenata Berber from Tagra (Algeria), and thus an alien among the Masmuda of southern Morocco, Abd al-Mu'min nonetheless saw off his principal rivals and hammered wavering tribes back to the fold. Three years after Ibn Tumart's death he was officially proclaimed "Caliph".

After 1133, Abd al-Mu'min quickly expanded Almohad control across the Maghreb, while the embattled Almoravids retained their capital in Marrakesh. Various other tribes rallied to the Almohads or to the Almoravids as the war between them continued. Initially, Almohad operations were limited to the Atlas mountains. In 1139, they expanded to the Rif mountains in the north. One of their early bases beyond the mountains was Taza, where Abd al-Mu"min founded a citadel (ribat) and a Great Mosque circa 1142.

The Almoravid ruler, Ali ibn Yusuf, died in 1143 and was succeeded by his son, Tashfin ibn Ali. The tide turned more definitively in favour of the Almohads from 1144 onwards, when the Zenata tribes in what is now western Algeria joined the Almohad camp, along with some of the previously Almoravid-aligned leaders of the Masufa tribe. This allowed them to defeat Tashfin decisively and capture Tlemcen in 1144. Tashfin fled to Oran, which the Almohads then attacked and captured, and he died in March 1145 while trying to escape. The Almohads pursued the defeated Almoravid army west to Fez, which they captured in 1146 after a nine-month siege. They finally captured Marrakesh in 1147, after an eleven-month siege. The last Almoravid ruler, Ishaq ibn Ali, was killed.

In 1151, Abd al-Mu'min launched an expedition to the east. This may have been encouraged by the Norman conquests along the coast of Ifriqiya, as fighting the Christian invaders here gave him a pretext for conquering the rest of the region. In August 1152, he captured Béjaïa, the capital of the Hammadids. The last Hammadid ruler, Yahya ibn Abd al-Aziz, fled by sea. The Arab tribes of the region, the Banu Hilal and Banu Sulaym, reacted to the Almohad advance by gathering an army against them. The Almohads routed them in the Battle of Sétif in April 1153. Abd al-Mu'min nonetheless saw value in their military abilities. He persuaded them by various means – including taking some families as hostages to Marrakesh and more generous actions like offering them material and land incentives – to move to present-day Morocco and join the Almohad armies. These moves also had the corollary effect of advancing the Arabisation of future Morocco. They were specifically settled into the Atlantic plains of Morocco which was previously depopulated by the Almohads. Without the Almohad recruitment of Arabs and resettling into the Atlantic plains, Morocco would have avoided the rural Arabisation that came with the Hilalian migrations into the Maghreb. The settlement added to the ethnic complexity of the Maghreb and the Arabs became the most powerful force in the Moroccan plains when the Almohad army declined. The Berbers who previously inhabited these plains were either Arabized or displaced to nearby mountains. There was also a significant amount of Arab and Berber intermarriage which led to the spread of Arabic language and restructuring of tribal structures. These plains are inhabited today by the descendants of these Arab tribes known as the ʕroubiya – a name that literally means "Bedouins".

Abd al-Mu'min spent the mid-1150s organizing the Almohad state and arranging for power to be passed on through his family line. In 1154, he declared his son Muhammad as his heir. In order to neutralise the power of the Masmuda, he relied on his tribe of origin, the Kumiyas (from the central Maghreb), whom he integrated into the Almohad power structure and from whom he recruited some 40,000 into the army. They would later form the bodyguard of the caliph and his successors. In addition, Abd al-Mu'min relied on Arabs, the great Hilalian families that he had deported to Morocco, to further weaken the influence of the Masmuda sheikhs. These Arabs became embedded in the Almohad elite to the point that they became partners in giving the bay‘a to a new caliph and formed the most important contingents in the Almohad military in Ifriqiya, al-Andalus and the provinces.

With his son appointed as his successor, Abd al-Mu'min placed his other children as governors of the provinces of the caliphate. His sons and descendants became known as the sayyids ("nobles"). To appease the traditional Masmuda elites, he appointed some of them, along with theirs sons and descendants, to act as important advisers, deputies, and commanders under the sayyids. They became known as the abnā' al-muwaḥḥidūn or "Sons of the Almohads". Abd al-Mu'min also altered the Almohad structure set up by Ibn Tumart by making the huffaz or reciters of the Quran into a training school of the Almohad elite. They were no longer described as "memorisers" but as "guardians" who learned riding, swimming, archery, and received a general education of high standards.

Abd al-Mu'min thus transformed the Almohads from an aristocratic Masmuda movement to a dynastic Mu'minid state. While most of the Almohad elites accepted this new concentration of power, it nonetheless triggered an uprising by two of Ibn Tumart's half-brothers, 'Abd al-'Aziz and 'Isa. Shortly after Abd al-Mu'min announced his heir, towards 1154–1155, they rebelled in Fez and then marched on Marrakesh, whose governor they killed. Abd al-Mu'min, who had been in Salé, returned to the city, defeated the rebels, and had everyone involved executed.

In March 1159, Abd al-Mu'min led a new campaign to the east. He conquered Tunis by force when the local Banu Khurasan leaders refused to surrender. Mahdia was besieged soon after and surrendered in January 1160. The Normans there negotiated their withdrawal and were allowed to leave for Sicily. Tripoli, which had rebelled against the Normans two years earlier, recognized Almohad authority right after.

In the 1170s and 1180s, Almohad power in the eastern Maghreb was challenged by the Banu Ghaniya and by Qaraqush, an Ayyubid commander. Yaqub al-Mansur eventually defeated both factions and reconquered Ifriqiya in 1187–1188. In 1189–1190, the Ayyubid sultan Salah ad-Din (Saladin) requested the assistance of an Almohad navy for his fight against the crusaders, which al-Mansur declined.

=== Expansion into al-Andalus ===
Almohad dominion in Iberia by mid-12th century.

Al-Andalus followed the fate of North Africa. Between 1146 and 1173, the Almohads gradually wrested control from the Almoravids over the Muslim principalities in Iberia. The Almohads transferred the capital of Muslim Iberia from Córdoba to Seville. They founded a great mosque there; its tower, the Giralda, was erected in 1184. The Almohads also built a palace there called Al-Muwarak on the site of the modern-day Alcázar of Seville.

The successors of Abd al-Mumin, Abu Yaqub Yusuf (Yusuf I, ruled 1163–1184) and Abu Yusuf Yaqub al-Mansur (Yaʻqūb I, ruled 1184–1199), were both able men. Initially their government drove many Jewish and Christian subjects to take refuge in the growing Christian states of Portugal, Castile, and Aragon. Ultimately they became less fanatical than the Almoravids, and Ya'qub al-Mansur was a highly accomplished man who wrote a good Arabic style and protected the philosopher Averroes. In 1190–1191, he campaigned in southern Portugal and won back territory lost in 1189. His title of "al-Manṣūr" ("the Victorious") was earned by his victory over Alfonso VIII of Castile in the Battle of Alarcos (1195).

From the time of Yusuf II, however, the Almohads governed their co-religionists in Iberia and central North Africa through lieutenants, their dominions outside Morocco being treated as provinces. When Almohad emirs crossed the Straits it was to lead a jihad against the Christians and then return to Morocco.

=== Holding years ===
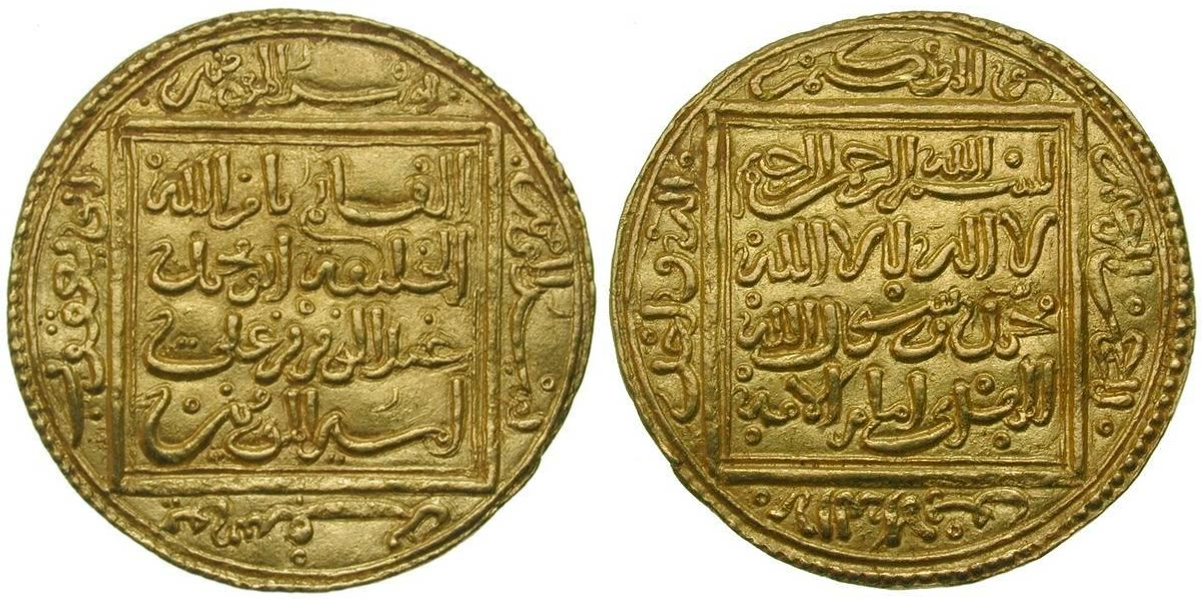
Coin minted during the reign of Abu Yaqub Yusuf

In 1212, the Almohad Caliph Muhammad 'al-Nasir' (1199–1214), the successor of al-Mansur, after an initially successful advance north, was defeated by an alliance of the three Christian kings of Castile, Aragón and Navarre at the Battle of Las Navas de Tolosa in the Sierra Morena. The battle broke the Almohad advance, but the Christian powers remained too disorganized to profit from it immediately.

Before his death in 1213, al-Nasir appointed his young ten-year-old son as the next caliph Yusuf II "al-Mustansir". The Almohads passed through a period of effective regency for the young caliph, with power exercised by an oligarchy of elder family members, palace bureaucrats and leading nobles. The Almohad ministers were careful to negotiate a series of truces with the Christian kingdoms, which remained more-or-less in place for next fifteen years (the loss of Alcácer do Sal to the Kingdom of Portugal in 1217 was an exception).

In early 1224, the youthful caliph died in an accident, without any heirs. The palace bureaucrats in Marrakesh, led by the wazir Uthman ibn Jam'i, quickly engineered the election of his elderly grand-uncle, Abd al-Wahid I 'al-Makhlu', as the new Almohad caliph. But the rapid appointment upset other branches of the family, notably the brothers of the late al-Nasir, who governed in al-Andalus. The challenge was immediately raised by one of them, then governor in Murcia, who declared himself Caliph Abdallah al-Adil. With the help of his brothers, he quickly seized control of al-Andalus. His chief advisor, the shadowy Abu Zayd ibn Yujjan, tapped into his contacts in Marrakesh, and secured the deposition and assassination of Abd al-Wahid I, and the expulsion of the al-Jami'i clan.

This coup has been characterized as the pebble that finally broke al-Andalus. It was the first internal coup among the Almohads. The Almohad clan, despite occasional disagreements, had always remained tightly knit and loyally behind dynastic precedence. Caliph al-Adil's murderous breach of dynastic and constitutional propriety marred his acceptability to other Almohad sheikhs. One of the recusants was his cousin, Abd Allah al-Bayyasi ("the Baezan"), the Almohad governor of Jaén, who took a handful of followers and decamped for the hills around Baeza. He set up a rebel camp and forged an alliance with the hitherto quiet Ferdinand III of Castile. Sensing his greater priority was Marrakesh, where recusant Almohad sheikhs had rallied behind Yahya, another son of al-Nasir, al-Adil paid little attention to them.

=== Decline in al-Andalus ===
In 1225, Abd Allah al-Bayyasi's band of rebels, accompanied by a large Castilian army, descended from the hills, besieging cities such as Jaén and Andújar. They raided throughout the regions of Jaén, Córdoba and Vega de Granada and, before the end of the year, al-Bayyasi had established himself in the city of Córdoba. Sensing a power vacuum, both Alfonso IX of León and Sancho II of Portugal opportunistically ordered raids into Andalusian territory that same year. With Almohad arms, men and cash dispatched to Morocco to help Caliph al-Adil impose himself in Marrakesh, there was little means to stop the sudden onslaught. In late 1225, with surprising ease, the Portuguese raiders reached the environs of Seville. Knowing they were outnumbered, the Almohad governors of the city refused to confront the Portuguese raiders, prompting the disgusted population of Seville to take matters into their own hands, raise a militia, and go out in the field by themselves. The result was a veritable massacre – the Portuguese men-at-arms easily mowed down the throng of poorly armed townsfolk. Thousands, perhaps as much as 20,000, were said to have been slain before the walls of Seville. A similar disaster befell a similar popular levy by Murcians at Aspe that same year. But Christian raiders had been stopped at Cáceres and Requena. Trust in the Almohad leadership was severely shaken by these events. The disasters were promptly blamed on the distractions of Caliph al-Adil and the incompetence and cowardice of his lieutenants, the successes credited to non-Almohad local leaders who rallied defenses.

But al-Adil's fortunes were briefly buoyed. In payment for Castilian assistance, al-Bayyasi had given Ferdinand III three strategic frontier fortresses: Baños de la Encina, Salvatierra (the old Order of Calatrava fortress near Ciudad Real) and Capilla. But Capilla refused to surrender, forcing the Castilians to lay a long and difficult siege. The brave defiance of little Capilla, and the spectacle of al-Bayyasi's shipping provisions to the Castilian besiegers, shocked Andalusians and shifted sentiment back towards the Almohad caliph. A popular uprising broke out in Córdoba – al-Bayyasi was killed and his head dispatched as a trophy to Marrakesh. But Caliph al-Adil did not rejoice in this victory for long – he was assassinated in Marrakesh in October 1227, by the partisans of Yahya, who was promptly acclaimed as the new Almohad caliph Yahya "al-Mu'tasim".

The Andalusian branch of the Almohads refused to accept this turn of events. Al-Adil's brother, then in Seville, proclaimed himself the new Almohad caliph Abd al-Ala Idris I 'al-Ma'mun'. He promptly purchased a truce from Ferdinand III in return for 300,000 maravedis, allowing him to organize and dispatch the greater part of the Almohad army in Spain across the straits in 1228 to confront Yahya.

That same year, Portuguese and Leonese renewed their raids deep into Muslim territory, largely unchecked. Feeling the Almohads had failed to protect them, popular uprisings took place throughout al-Andalus. City after city deposed their hapless Almohad governors and installed local strongmen in their place. A Murcian strongman, Ibn Hud, who claimed descendance from the Banu Hud dynasty that had once ruled the old taifa of Saragossa, emerged as the central figure of these rebellions, systematically dislodging Almohad garrisons through central Spain. In October 1228, with Spain practically all lost, al-Ma'mun abandoned Seville, taking what little remained of the Almohad army with him to Morocco. Ibn Hud immediately dispatched emissaries to distant Baghdad to offer recognition to the Abbasid Caliph, albeit taking up for himself a quasi-caliphal title, 'al-Mutawwakil'.

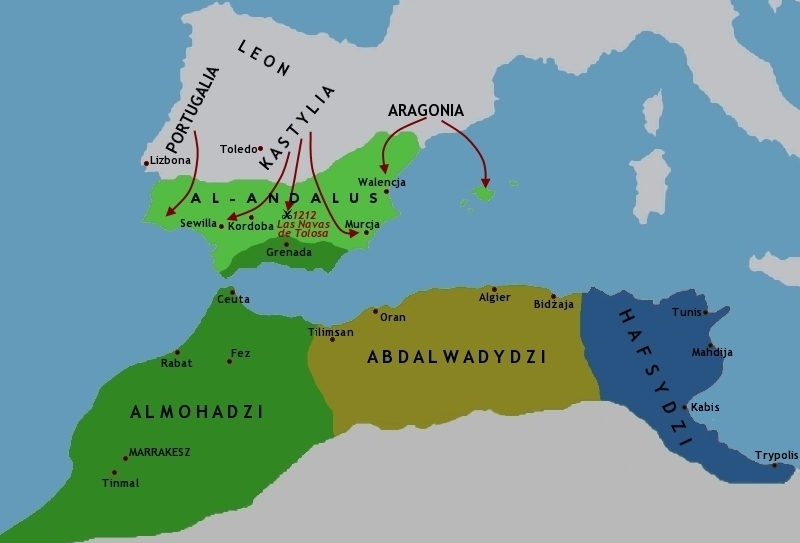
Almohads after 1212

The departure of al-Ma'mun in 1228 marked the end of the Almohad era in Spain. Ibn Hud and the other local Andalusian strongmen were unable to stem the rising flood of Christian attacks, launched almost yearly by Sancho II of Portugal, Alfonso IX of León, Ferdinand III of Castile and James I of Aragon. The next twenty years saw a massive advance in the Christian reconquista – the old great Andalusian citadels fell in a grand sweep: Mérida and Badajoz in 1230 (to Leon), Mallorca in 1230 (to Aragon), Beja in 1234 (to Portugal), Córdoba in 1236 (to Castile), Valencia in 1238 (to Aragon), Niebla-Huelva in 1238 (to Leon), Silves in 1242 (to Portugal), Murcia in 1243 (to Castile), Jaén in 1246 (to Castile), Alicante in 1248 (to Castile), culminating in the fall of the greatest of Andalusian cities, the ex-Almohad capital of Seville, into Christian hands in 1248. Ferdinand III of Castile entered Seville as a conqueror on December 22, 1248.

The Andalusians were helpless before this onslaught. Ibn Hud had attempted to check the Leonese advance early on, but most of his Andalusian army was destroyed at the battle of Alange in 1230. Ibn Hud scrambled to move remaining arms and men to save threatened or besieged Andalusian citadels, but with so many attacks at once, it was a hopeless endeavor. After Ibn Hud's death in 1238, some of the Andalusian cities, in a last-ditch effort to save themselves, offered themselves once again to the Almohads, but to no avail. The Almohads would not return.

With the departure of the Almohads, the Nasrid dynasty ("Banū Naṣr", Arabic: بنو نصر) rose to power in Granada. After the great Christian advance of 1228–1248, the Emirate of Granada was practically all that remained of old al-Andalus. Some of the captured citadels (e.g. Murcia, Jaen, Niebla) were reorganized as tributary vassals for a few more years, but most were annexed by the 1260s. Granada alone would remain independent for an additional 250 years, flourishing as the new center of al-Andalus.

=== Collapse in the Maghreb ===
In their African holdings, the Almohads encouraged the establishment of Christians even in Fez, and after the Battle of Las Navas de Tolosa they occasionally entered into alliances with the kings of Castile. The history of their decline differs from that of the Almoravids, whom they had displaced. They were not assailed by a great religious movement, but lost territories, piecemeal, by the revolt of tribes and districts. Their most effective enemies were the Banu Marin (Marinids) who founded the next dynasty. The last representative of the line, Idris al-Wathiq, was reduced to the possession of Marrakesh, where he was murdered by a slave in 1269.

== Government ==
The Council of Ten was a group of Ibn Tumart's earliest and closest disciples, at the top of the hierarchy of the Almohad movement.

== Military ==
The Almohad army was made up of Berber tribesmen who were organised in a tribal hierarchy reflecting their status in the Almohad movement. The Almohad army was reliant on tribal structures for mobilisation purposes. Tribal shaykhs functioned as de facto military commanders for their men and Abd al-Mumin would consult them on matters of military policy. The most important Almohad shaykhs would lead military campaigns and many were appointed as military governors. These shaykhs formed the politico-military elite of the empire. The Almohad army was supplemented with Arab auxiliaries coming from the Banu Hilal who migrated into the Maghreb in the 12th century. Other smaller units of Christian mercenaries, black slaves and soldiers described in Maghrebi sources as "Ghuzz" also supplemented the Almohad army.

=== Berbers ===
Abd al-Mu'min created new politico-military cadres called the huffāẓ who were recuited from Berber tribes. Some authors claim they were recruited from only the Almohad tribes while others claim they were recruited from only the Masmuda. 'Abd al-Wahid al-Marrakushi described the Almohad tribes:

The Almohad tribes who are called by this name, and form the army [jund], the collaborators and the helpers [anṣār] (the rest of the Berbers and the Maṣmūda are their subjects [raʿīya] and under their authority) are seven in number. The first of them is the tribe of Ibn Tūmart, the Harga, who are few in number compared with the other tribes. Then there is the tribe of ʿAbd al-Muʾmin, the Kūmiya, a large tribe with many branches. Neither in ancient or modem times were they known for leadership or great reputation: they were nothing but peasant farmers, shepherds and traders in the markets selling milk, firewood and other cheap goods... Today they are a people second to none in the Maghreb and have no rivals because ʿAbd al-Muʾmin originated from them, though some said he came from elsewhere as we mentioned above. Next there were the people of Tīnmal who came from different tribes but joined in taking the name of this place. Then there were the Hintāta, which was also a very large tribe, part of which enjoyed leadership and honour in ancient times, the Ganfīsa, a glorious and powerful tribe who spoke the purest and best Berber, and the Gadmīwa who were not entirely, but in part, subjects [raʿīya]. Finally there were those of the Ṣanhāja who had answered the call of the Almohads, and the Haskura. These are all the Almohad tribes entitled to the name: they take salaries [ʿaṭāʾ], form the armies and join in expeditions. All the other Maṣmūda tribes were subjects.

Abd al-Mumin having a sense of affinity with the Zenata of the Tlemcen area recruited many of them into the Almohad army strengthening his position.

=== Arabs ===
After the defeat of the Arab tribes at the Battle of Sétif, Abd al-Mumin integrated them into the Almohad army. He treated the Arabs with great leniency after Setif and to intice the Arabs into joining the Almohad army, Abd al-Mumin kept their wives and children captive (although he did not sell them into slavery). After they came to Marrakesh, he showered them with gifts and told them to return to the Eastern Maghreb with their families. Abd al-Mumin's claimed Qaysi Arab lineage included the Banu Hilal and Banu Sulaym and was an effective propogandistic tactic used for rallying these tribes.

The recruitment and relocation of the Arabs was used to counterbalance the power of the original Almohad tribes and to pacify Ifriqya and the Central Maghreb by diluting the power of the Arabs in those regions. Another motive to recruit these tribes was due to the need for their military service in al-Andalus. The Arab tribes formed the most important contingents in the Almohad military in Ifriqiya, al-Andalus and the provinces and they were used on a regular basis in larger military expeditions within the empire. In the western Islamic lands, they had a formidable reputation as soldiers and were particularly prized as cavalry. They typically fought as lancers and their signature tactic was karr wa farr (attack and retreat). After their integration into the Almohad military and political system, they intervened in most of the military operations in the Maghreb and al-Andalus. For example, 40,000 Arab horsemen fought alongside Abu Yaqub Yusuf on his expedition to Santarem in 1184. The counsel of the Arab shaykhs was solicited for each expedition they participated in.

The salaries of the Arabs was much higher than other members of the Almohad military. According to Andalusian historian Ibn Sahib al-Salat, for the Arabs, fully-equipped horsemen were each paid 25 dinars, unequipped or partially equipped 15 dinars and foot soldiers were paid 7 dinars. Comparatively, for ordinary soldiers, fully equipped infantrymen received 8 dinars, unequipped infantry received 3 dinars, fully equipped horsemen received 10 dinars and unequipped received 8 dinars. Furthermore, minor Arab chiefs received 50 dinars with paramount chiefs receiving 1000 dinars.

=== Others ===
According to the historian Amira Bennison, a diverse army was a "visible sign of imperial power" with the Almohad recruitment of multiple groups meant to symbolically reflect the "ability of the caliph to command men of all colours and races". One of these groups was the Ghuzz or the Aghzaz, a name derived from the Ghuzz Turks. The Ghuzz referred to military adventures from Ayyubid lands of Turkish, Armenian and Kurdish origin who formed a small component of the army. According to Almohad-era historian Abd al-Wahid al-Marrakushi, the Ghuzz were treated better than regular Almohad soldiers and were paid more regularly (the Ghuzz were paid once a month while regular Almohad soldiers were paid 3 times a year). The most famous of the Ghuzz was Qaraqush an Armenian Mamluk who initially fought against the Almohads but accepted service under Yaqub al-Mansur after being defeated in battle. The Almohad army also had a considerable number of blacks with some serving as special guards to the Almohad rulers. Muhammad al-Nasir had a special body of 30,000 blacks armed with spears and javelins in his army. Christian mercenaries were also extensively used by the later Almohad rulers.

== Culture ==
=== Language ===
==== Berber languages ====
The use of Berber languages, particularly as spoken by the Masmuda, was important in Almohad doctrine. According to Mehdi Ghouirgate, "the most substantial Berber sources relating to the medieval period are linked to Tashelhit, both from the point of view of lexicon and morphology."

Under the Almohads, the khuṭba (sermon) at Friday prayer was made to be delivered in Arabic and Berber, with the latter referred to as al-lisān al-gharbī (Arabic: اللسان الغربي, lit. 'the western tongue') by the Andalusi historian Ibn Ṣāḥib aṣ-Ṣalāt. For example, the khaṭīb, or sermon-giver, of al-Qarawiyyīn Mosque in Fez, Mahdī ibn 'Īsā, was replaced under the Almohads by Abū l-Ḥasan ibn 'Aṭiyya because he was fluent in Berber.

==== Romance ====
As the Almohads rejected the status of Dhimma, the Almohad conquest of al-Andalus caused the emigration of Andalusi Christians from southern Iberia to the Christian north, which had an impact on the use of Romance within Almohad territory. After the Almohad period, Muslim territories in Iberian Peninsula were reduced to the Emirate of Granada, in which the percentage of the population that had converted to Islam reached 90% and Arabic-Romance bilingualism, widespread in previous centuries of Muslim rule in the Iberia, seems to have disappeared.

==== Arabic dialects ====
The French Orientalist Georges-Séraphin Colin—based on a collection of Almohad-era texts heavily influenced by vernacular speech, edited by Évariste Lévi-Provençal—identifies various points of contact and divergence between Andalusi Arabic and Maghrebi Arabic in the Almohad period.

When the Almohads incorporated the Banu Hilal and the Banu Sulaym into their army, a process of Arabization in the central and far Maghreb led to the spread of the Arabic language. The Almohad Caliphs also fostered the Arabization of the elites whom many of were recruited from the Berber-speaking population.

=== Literature ===
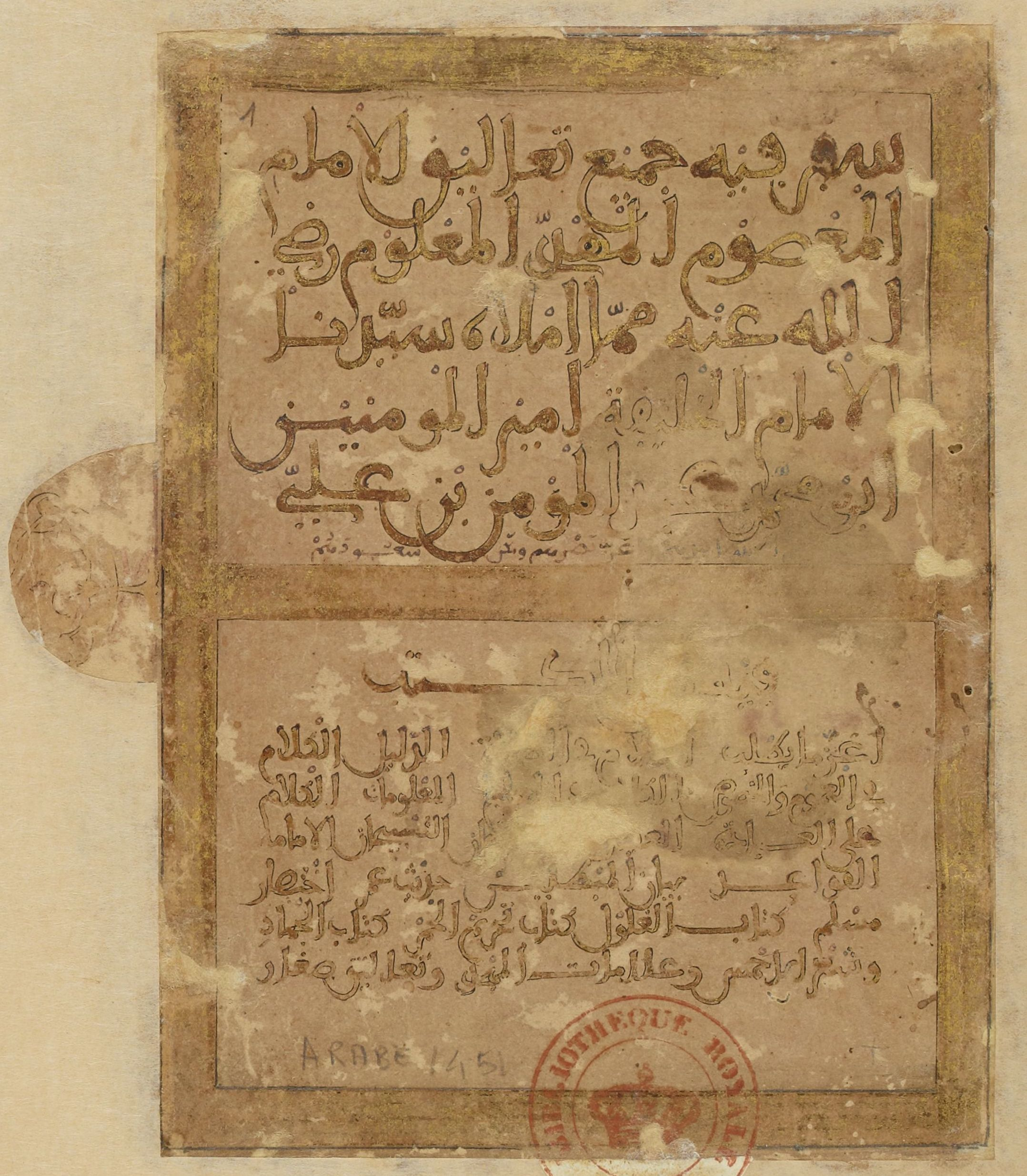
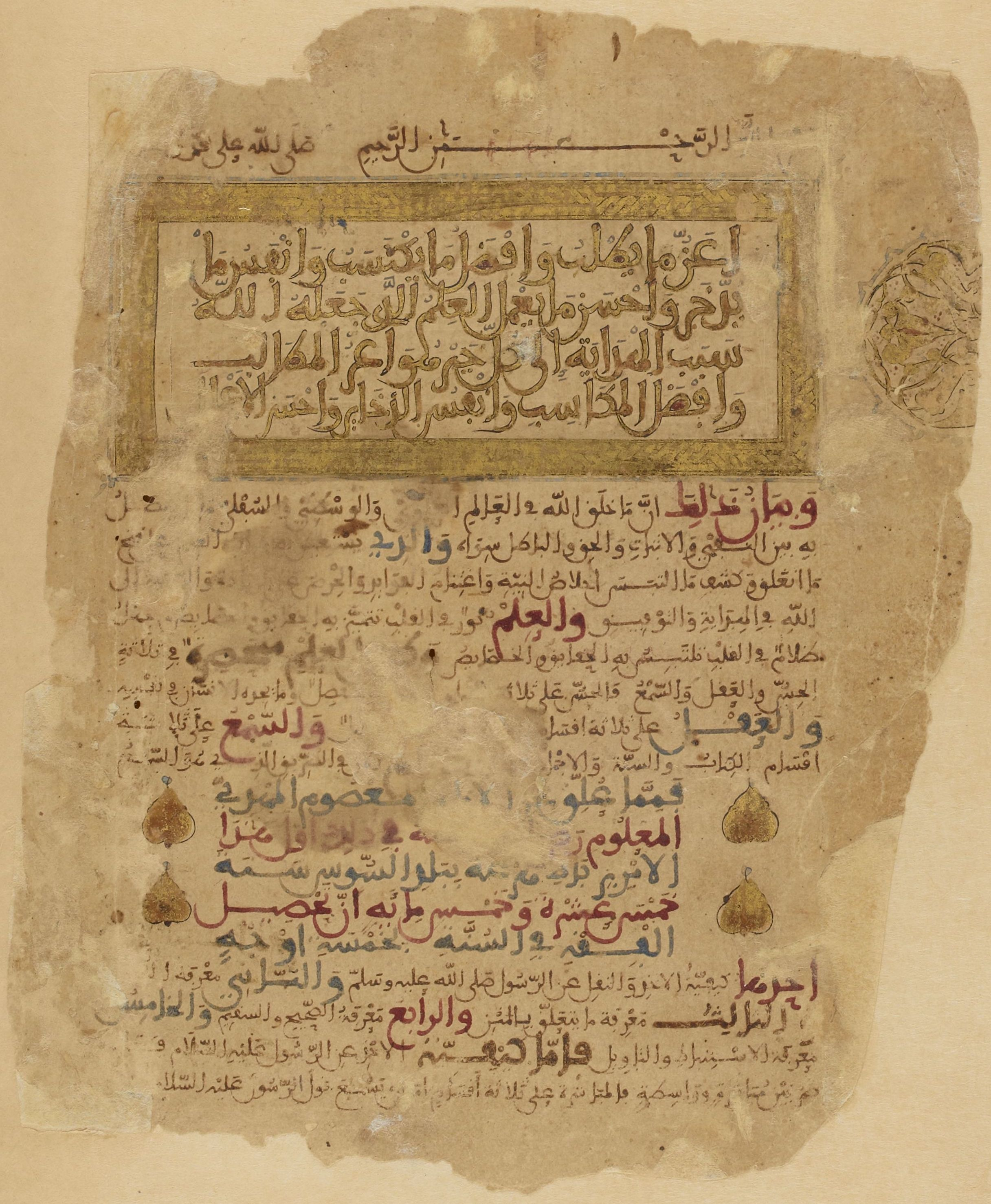
An 1183 manuscript of Ibn Tumart's Aʿazzu Mā Yuṭlab written in a Maghrebi script.

The Almohads worked to suppress the influence of the Maliki school of fiqh, even publicly burning copies of Muwatta Imam Malik and Maliki commentaries. They sought to disseminate ibn Tumart's beliefs; he was the author of the Aʿazzu Mā Yuṭlab, the Counterpart of the Muwatta (محاذي الموطأ), and the Compendium of Sahih Muslim (تلخيص صحيح مسلم).

Literary production continued despite the devastating effect of the Almohad reforms on cultural life in their domain. Almohad universities continued the knowledge of preceding Andalusi scholars as well as ancient Greek and Roman writers; contemporary literary figures included Averroes, Hafsa bint al-Hajj al-Rukuniyya, ibn Tufayl, ibn Zuhr, ibn al-Abbar, ibn Amira and many more poets, philosophers, and scholars. The abolishment of the dhimmi status of religious minorities further stifled the once flourishing Golden age of Jewish culture in Spain; Maimonides went east and many Jews moved to Castilian-controlled Toledo.

According to the research of Muhammad al-Manuni, there were 400 paper mills in Fez under the reign of Sultan Yaqub al-Mansur in the 12th century.

=== Theology and philosophy ===
The Almohad ideology preached by Ibn Tumart is described by Amira Bennison as a "sophisticated hybrid form of Islam that wove together strands from Hadith science, Zahiri and Shafi'i fiqh, Ghazalian social actions (hisba), and spiritual engagement with Shi'i notions of the imam and mahdi". This contrasted with the highly orthodox or traditionalist Maliki school (maddhab) of Sunni Islam which predominated in the region up to that point. Central to his philosophy, Ibn Tumart preached a fundamentalist or radical version of tawhid – referring to a strict monotheism or to the "oneness of God". This notion gave the movement its name: al-Muwaḥḥidūn (Arabic: المُوَحِّدون), meaning roughly "those who advocate tawhid", which was adapted to "Almohads" in European writings. Ibn Tumart saw his movement as a revolutionary reform movement much as early Islam saw itself relative to the Christianity and Judaism which preceded it, with himself as its mahdi and leader.

In terms of Muslim jurisprudence, the state gave recognition to the Zahiri (ظاهري) school of thought, though Shafi'ites were also given a measure of authority at times. While not all Almohad leaders were Zahirites, quite a few of them were not only adherents of the legal school but also well-versed in its tenets. Additionally, all Almohad leaders – both the religiously learned and the laymen – were hostile toward the Malikite school favored by the Almoravids. During the reign of Abu Yaqub, chief judge Ibn Maḍāʾ oversaw the banning of all religious books written by non-Zahirites; when Abu Yaqub's son Abu Yusuf took the throne, he ordered Ibn Maḍāʾ to undertake the actual burning of such books.

In terms of Islamic theology, the Almohads were Ash'arites, their Zahirite-Ash'arism giving rise to a complicated blend of literalist jurisprudence and esoteric dogmatics. Some authors occasionally describe Almohads as heavily influenced by Mu'tazilism. Scholar Madeline Fletcher argues that while one of Ibn Tumart's original teachings, the murshidas (a collection of sayings memorized by his followers), holds positions on the attributes of God which might be construed as moderately Mu'tazilite (and which were criticized as such by Ibn Taimiyya), identifying him with Mu'tazilites would be an exaggeration. She points out that another of his main texts, the 'aqida (which was likely edited by others after him), demonstrates a much clearer Ash'arite position on a number of issues.

Nonetheless, the Almohads, particularly from the reign of Caliph Abu Yusuf Ya'qub al-Mansur onward, embraced the use of logical reasoning as a method of validating the more central Almohad concept of tawhid. This effectively provided a religious justification for philosophy and for a rationalist intellectualism in Almohad religious thought. Al-Mansur's father, Abu Ya'qub Yusuf, had also shown some favour towards philosophy and kept the philosopher Ibn Tufayl as his confidant. Ibn Tufayl in turn introduced Ibn Rush (Averroes) to the Almohad court, to whom Al-Mansur gave patronage and protection. Although Ibn Rushd (who was also an Islamic judge) saw rationalism and philosophy as complementary to religion and revelation, his views failed to convince the traditional Maliki ulema, with whom the Almohads were already at odds. After the decline of Almohadism, Maliki Sunnism ultimately became the dominant official religious doctrine of the region. By contrast, the teachings of Ibn Rushd and other philosophers like him were far more influential for Jewish philosophers – including Maimonides, his contemporary – and Christian Latin scholars – like Thomas Aquinas – who later promoted his commentaries on Aristotle.

=== Emblem ===
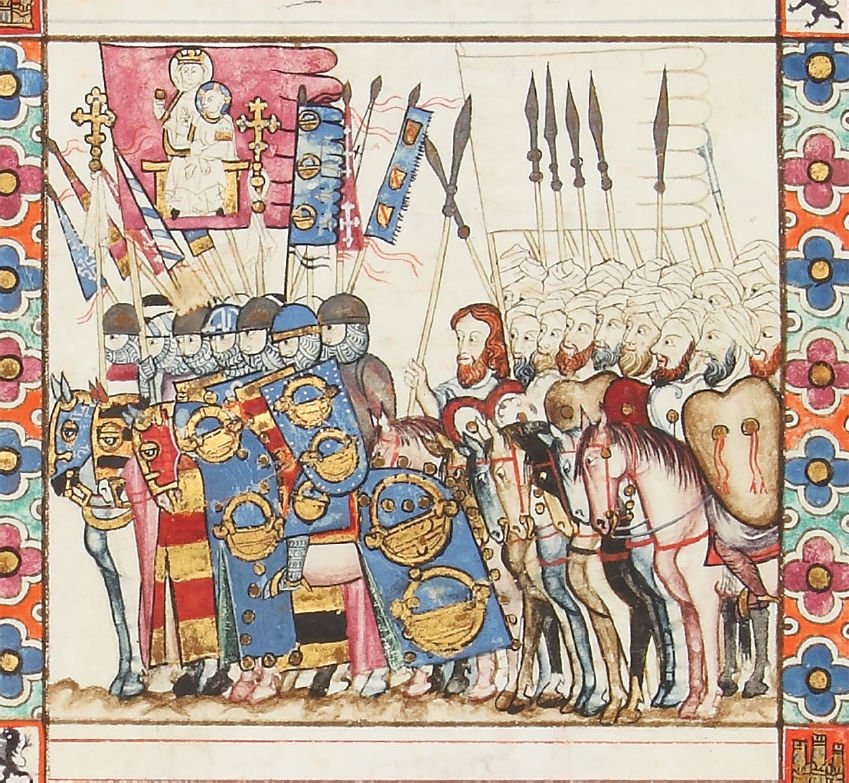
Almohad soldiers in the Cantigas de Santa Maria, depicted on the right under white banners

Most historical records indicate that the Almohads were recognized for their use of white banners, which were supposed to evoke their "purity of purpose". This began a long tradition of using white as main dynastic color in what is now Morocco for the later Marinids and Saadian sultanates. Whether these white banners contained any specific motifs or inscriptions is not certain. Historian Ḥasan 'Ali Ḥasan writes:

As for the flags of the Almohads, the main flag was white, and on one side was written during the reign of Ibn Tumart: "The one Allah, Muhammad is the Messenger of Allah, the Mahdi is the successor of Allah", and on the other side: "There is no god but Allah, and my success is only with Allah, and I entrust my affairs to Allah", and the white color continued with the rest of the caliphs, even if they adopted other colored flags, red, yellow and other colors. There is no doubt that these flags in their different colors delighted and pleased the people.

According to historian Amira Benninson, the caliphs usually left their capital Marrakesh for war in al-Andalus preceded by the white banner of the Almohads, the Quran of 'Uthman and Quran of Ibn Tumart. Egyptian historiographer Al-Qalqashandi (d. 1418) mentioned white flags in two places, the first being when he spoke about the Almohad flag in Tunisia, where he stated that: "It was a white flag called the victorious flag, and it was raised before their sultan when riding for Eid prayers or for the movement of the makhzen slaves (which were the ordinary people of the country and the people of the markets)". By the end of the Almohad reign, dissident movements would adopt black in recognition of the Abbasid caliphate and in rejection of the Almohad authority.

The Book of Knowledge of All Kingdoms, written by a Franciscan friar in the 14th century (well after the end of the Almohad period), describes the flag of Marrakesh as being red with a black-and-white checkerboard motif at its center. Some authors have assumed this flag to be the former flag of the Almohads.

In modern times, Islamic al-Andalus in Andalusian collective memory allowed more awareness of the colors of the Andalusian flag, chosen in 1918 by Blas Infante, a founding figure of Andalusia. Infante has explained the design of its flag by indicating that green was the color of the Umayyads and white that of the Almohads, the caliphates which represented periods of "greatness and power" in this region.

=== Art ===
==== Calligraphy and manuscripts ====
The Almohad dynasty embraced a style of cursive Maghrebi script known today as "Maghrebi thuluth" as an official style used in manuscripts, coinage, documents, and architecture. However, the more angular Kufic script was still used, albeit in a reworked form in Qur'an epigraphy, and was seen detailed in silver in some colophons. The Maghrebi thuluth script, frequently written in gold, was used to give emphasis when standard writing, written in rounded Maghrebi mabsūt script, was considered insufficient. Maghrebi mabsūt of the al-Andalus region during the 12th to 14th centuries was characterized by elongated lines, stretched out curves, and the use of multiple colors for vocalizations, as derived from the people of Medina.

Scribes and calligraphers of the Almohad period also started to illuminate words and phrases in manuscripts for emphasis, using gold leaf and lapis lazuli. While much of the script was written in black or brown ink, the use of polychromy for diacritical text and vocalizations also marked a departure from previous caliphates' calligraphic styles. Blue dots were used to indicate elif, orange dots denoted hamza, and yellow semicircles to marked shaddah. Separate sets of verses were denoted by various medallions, with distinctive designs for each set. For example, sets of five verses were ended with bud-like medallions while sets of ten were marked by circular medallions, all of which were typically painted in gold. Manuscripts attributed to this caliphate were characterized by interlacing geometric or recti-curvilinear illuminations, and abstract vegetal artwork and large medallions were often present in the margins and as thumbnails. Composite floral finials were also frequently used in decorating the margins and corners of the page. Color schemes focused on primarily using gold, white, and blue, with accentuating elements in red or pink.

During the Almohad dynasty, the act of bookbinding itself took on great importance, with a notable instance of the Almohad caliph Abd al-Mu'min bringing in artisans for a celebration of the binding of a Qur'an imported from Córdoba. Books were most frequently bound in goatskin leather and decorated with polygonal interlacing, goffering, and stamping. The primary materials used for the pages were goat or sheep vellum. However, the Almohad dynasty also saw industrial advancements in the spread of paper mills in Seville and Marrakesh, leading to the introduction of paper for Qur'an manuscripts, illuminated doctrine books, and official documents. Most Qur'anic manuscripts were close to square-shaped, though other religious texts were typically vertically oriented. With the exception of a few large-scale Qur'ans, most were modestly sized, ranging from 11 centimenters to 22 centimeters on each side, with 19 to 27 lines of script each page. In contrast, large-sized Qur'ans were typically approximately 60 centimeters by 53 centimeters and had an average of five to nine lines of script to a page, typically in Maghrebi thuluth.

Hadith Bayāḍ wa Riyāḍ, the love story of Bayad and Riyad, is one of the few remaining illustrated manuscripts dated to 13th century Almohad caliphate. Its use of miniatures displays a clear connection with previous illustrated tradition from the eastern Islamic world. However, it deviates in its depictions of the frontispiece, interior, and teaching scenes, which show similarities to scientific manuscripts from the central Islamic world, typically considered to have consisted of the Arabian peninsula, northeast modern Iran, and the Fertile Crescent. Depictions of architecture specific to the Almohad caliphate are also evident in several places in the manuscript.

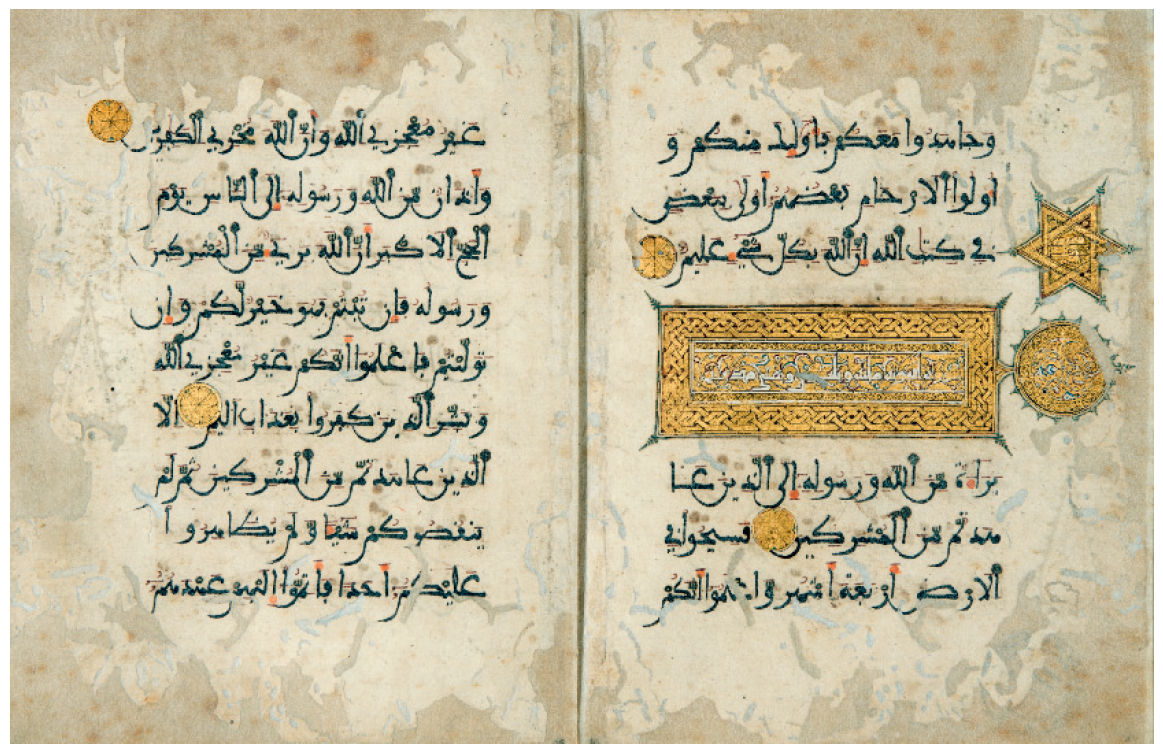
A copy of the Qur'an personally transcribed by Caliph al-Murtada, circa 1266

The penultimate Almohad caliph, Abu Hafs al-Murtada, was a notable calligrapher in his own right and composed poems and copied Qur'ans. A known bibliophile, he frequently endowed books to madrasas and mosques and established the first public manuscript transcription center in Marrakesh. One of the large Qur'ans that he copied has been preserved in Marrakesh and is the oldest surviving example in the western Islamic world of a Qur'an personally produced by a sovereign ruler. The 10-volume tome is written on parchment and bound with a leather cover decorated with a geometric motif, exhibiting the first dated use of gold tooling on a manuscript binding. The verses are written in Maghrebi mabsūt script and the end of each verse is marked by a gold circle divided into eight uniform segments. Using large Maghrebi script, there are five to 10 lines to a page, with relatively few words to each line. There is lavish use of gold, and this Qur'an, as with other Qur'ans of this size, was likely intended for court use.

==== Textiles ====
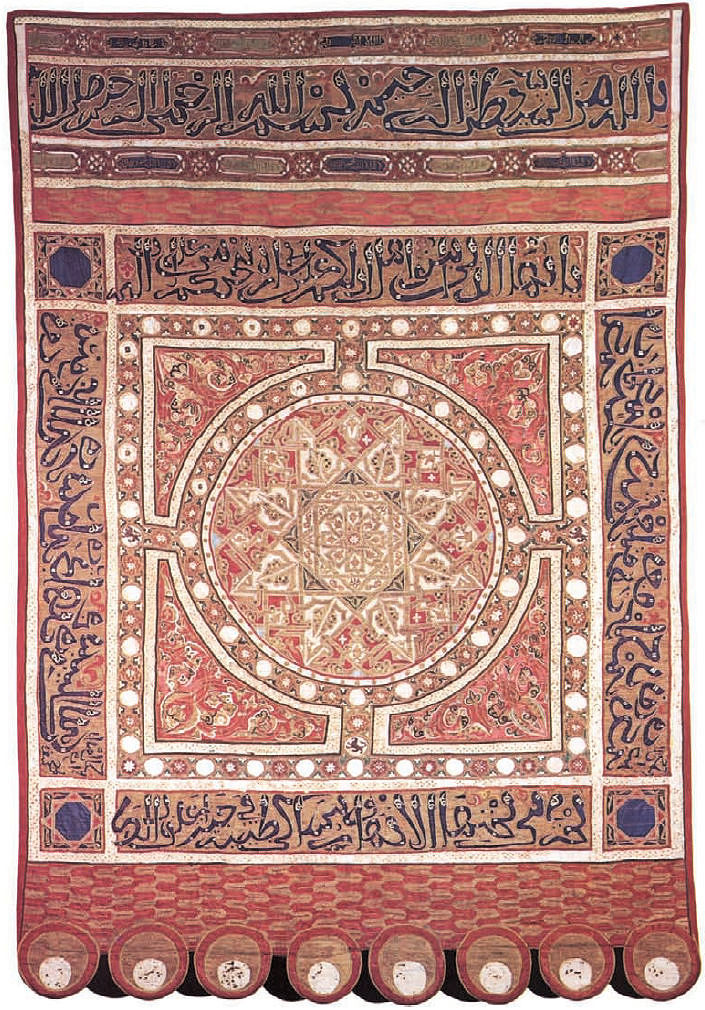
The "Las Navas de Tolosa banner", an Almohad banner captured by Ferdinand III in the 13th century

The Almohads initially eschewed the production of luxury textiles and silks, but eventually they too engaged in this production. Almohad textiles, like earlier Almoravid examples, were often decorated with a grid of roundels filled with ornamental designs or Arabic epigraphy. However, textiles produced by Almohad workshops used progressively less figural decoration than previous Almoravid textiles, in favour of interlacing geometric and vegetal motifs.

One of the best-known textiles traditionally attributed to the Almohads is the "Las Navas de Tolosa Banner", so-called because it was once thought to be a spoil won by Alfonso VIII at the Battle of Las Navas de Tolosa in 1212. More recent studies have proposed that it was actually a spoil won some years later by Ferdinand III. The banner was then donated to the Monastery of Santa Maria la Real de Huelgas in Burgos, where it remains today. The banner is richly designed and features blue Arabic inscriptions and white decorative patterns on a red background. The central motif features an eight-pointed star framed by a circle inside a larger square, with smaller motifs filling the bands of the frame and the corner spaces. This central design is surrounded on four sides by Arabic inscriptions in Naskhi script featuring Qur'anic verses (Surah 61: 10–12), and another horizontal inscription in the banner's upper part which praises God and Muhammad. Recent studies have argued that the banner is of 14th century origin rather than of Almohad origin, due to its similarities with captured Marinid banners kept at the Cathedral of Toledo and to its similarities with Nasrid motifs. It remains uncertain whether it was crafted either in Fez under the Marinids or in Granada under the Nasrids.

==== Metalwork ====
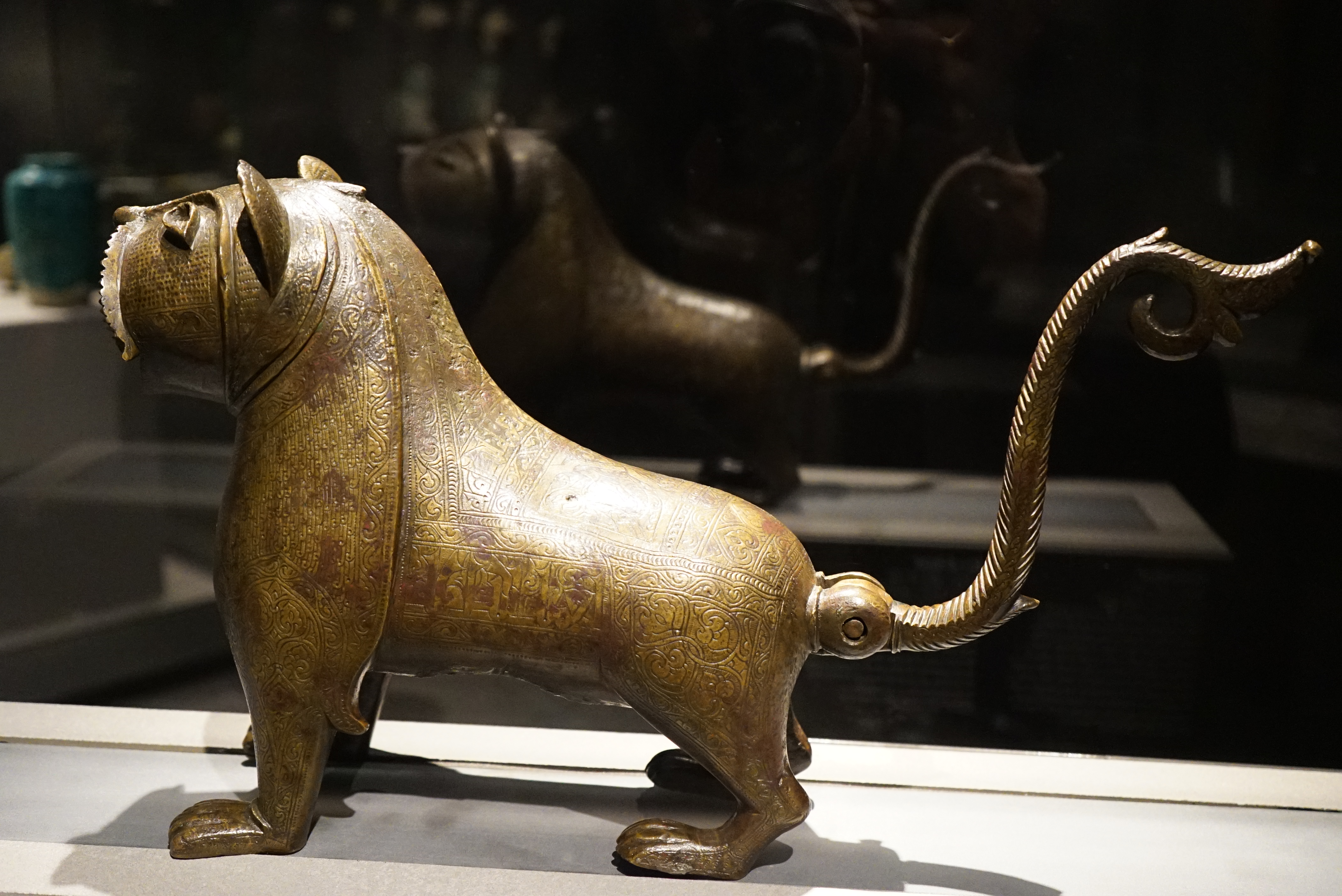
The Monzón Lion, a bronze fountain from Al-Andalus dating from the 12th-13th century

The French historian Henri Terrasse described al-Qarawiyyin's bronze grand chandelier, commissioned by Caliph Muhammad al-Nasir, as "the largest and most beautiful chandelier in the Islamic world." The chandelier consists of a 12-sided cupola on top of which is mounted a large cone crowned around its sides with nine levels of candlesticks. The visible surfaces of the chandelier are carved and pierced with intricate floral arabesque motifs as well as Kufic Arabic inscriptions. The chandelier is now the oldest surviving chandelier in the western Islamic world, and it likely served as a model for the later and nearly equally famous Marinid chandelier in the Great Mosque of Taza.

Another important piece, the so-called Monzón Lion, also dates from the Almohad period during the 12 or 13th century and is held in the Louvre Museum today. It is an example of figural bronze sculpture from al-Andalus that continues in the tradition of earlier objects such as the 11th-century Pisa Griffin (kept at the Cathedral Museum of Pisa) and the 10th-century Stag of Córdoba made in Madinat al-Zahra (now kept at the Archeological Museum of Córdoba). It was found in Monzón, near Palencia, but it is not known where exactly in the Iberian Peninsula it was made. As Palencia was outside the Almohad realm, it may have been made by Andalusi craftsman for a Christian patron. The lion, which served as a fountainhead, is sculpted in a highly stylized manner and its articulated tail is adjustable. Its surface is covered in incised decoration consisting of tapestry-like motifs, and a broad Kufic inscription on its side features well-wishes for its owner.

Other surviving metalwork objects from the Almohad period include a series of braziers and lamps discovered in Córdoba and now kept at the Archeological Museum of Córdoba. One of them, a hexagonal brazier, features both incised and pierced decoration. Along with prominent decorative Kufic inscriptions, it has an architectural motif of merlons resembling the decorative sawtooth-shaped merlons found along the tops of Moorish and Moroccan buildings of the same period.

==== Ceramics and tilework ====
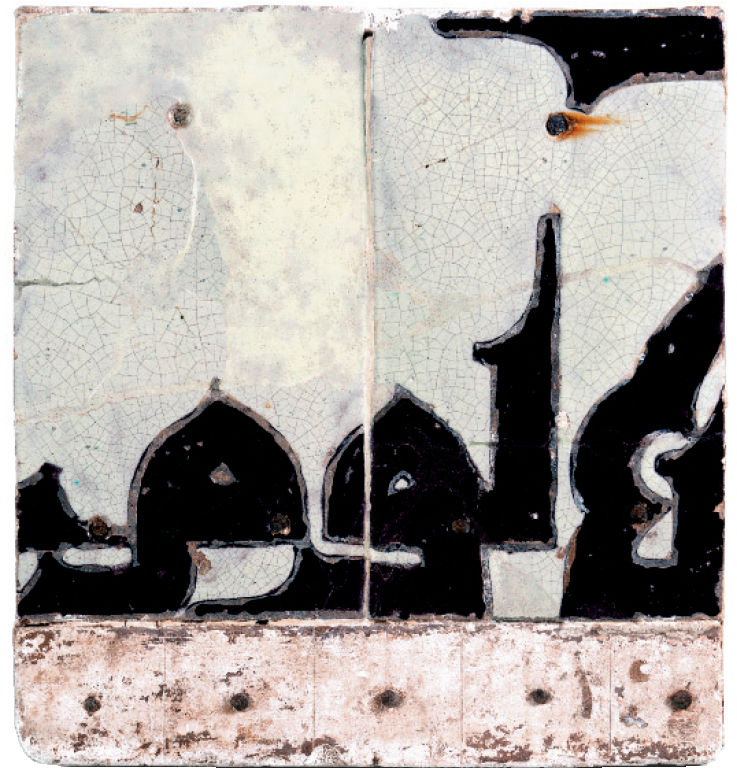
Fragment of Kufic inscription on cuerda seca tiles formerly around the minaret of the Kasbah Mosque

Jonathan Bloom cites the white and green glazed tiles on the minaret of the Kutubiyya Mosque, dating from the mid-12th century in the early Almohad period, as the earliest reliably-dated example of zellij in Morocco. The tiles currently installed on the minaret are modern reproductions of the original decoration, but some of the original tiles were preserved in a collection kept at the Badi Palace. The same collection has also preserved fragments of the original tile decoration on the minaret of the Kasbah Mosque, including fragments of a Kufic inscription which is no longer present on the minaret today. These latter fragments are also the earliest surviving example of cuerda seca tilework (a technique originating in al-Andalus) being used in an architectural context.

==== Painted decoration ====
The Kutubiyya Mosque's minaret in Marrakesh originally had polychrome painted decoration around the windows and blind arches on its exterior façades, featuring a mix of geometric and vegetal arabesque motifs. In Seville, some Almohad-era houses have been excavated in various locations in the city, particularly on the site of the present-day cathedral. At least one of these excavations have revealed the remains of mural decoration featuring interlacing geometric decoration. Decorations of a hammam dating back to the Almohad period were uncovered in a bar in Seville during renovations in 2020. The decorations feature red ochre paintings of concave hexadecagons and eightfold rosettes on engraved white lime mortar in a pattern that fits the hammam's geometric skylight holes.

=== Architecture ===
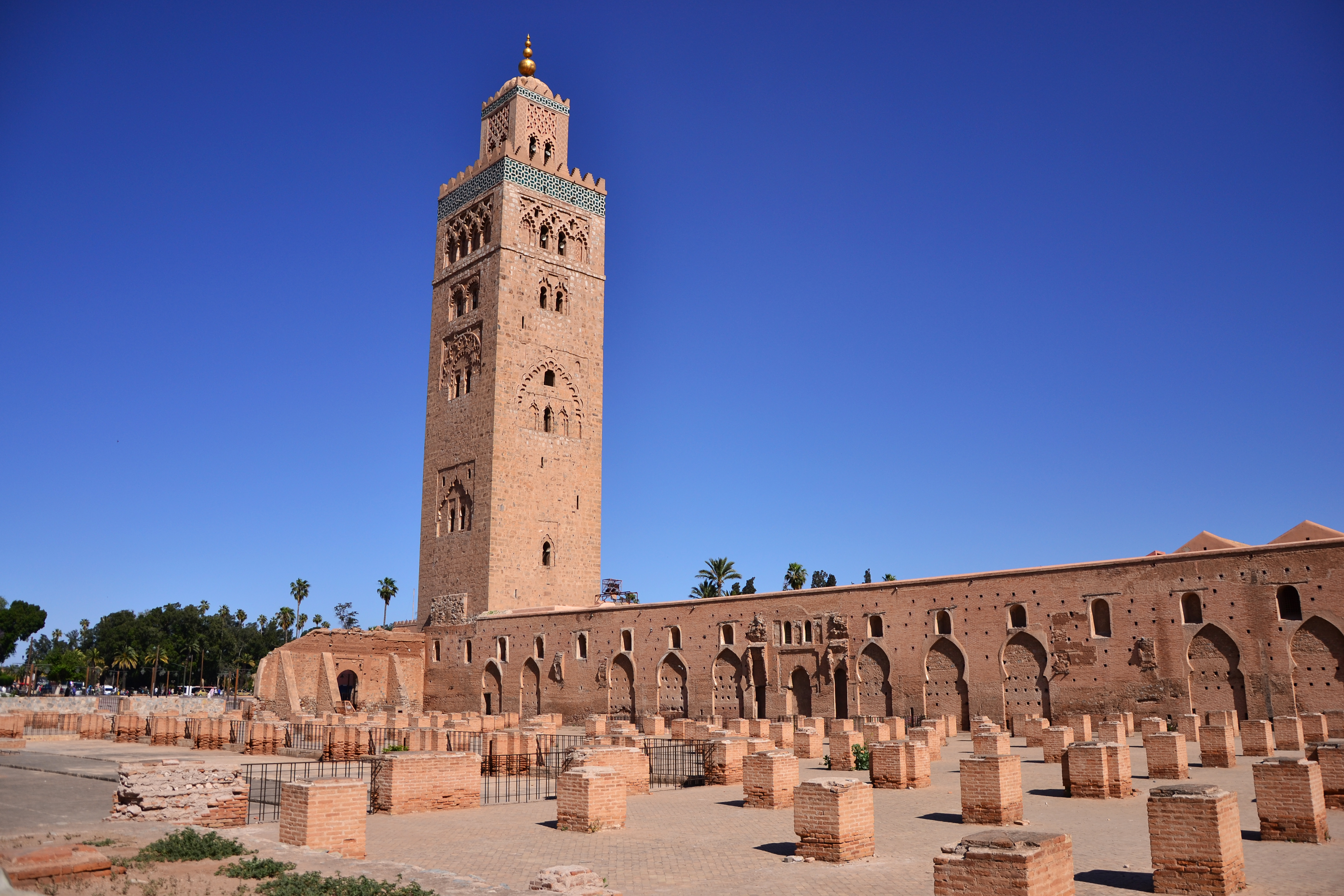
The Kutubiyya Mosque in Marrakesh, founded by Abd al-Mu'min in 1147

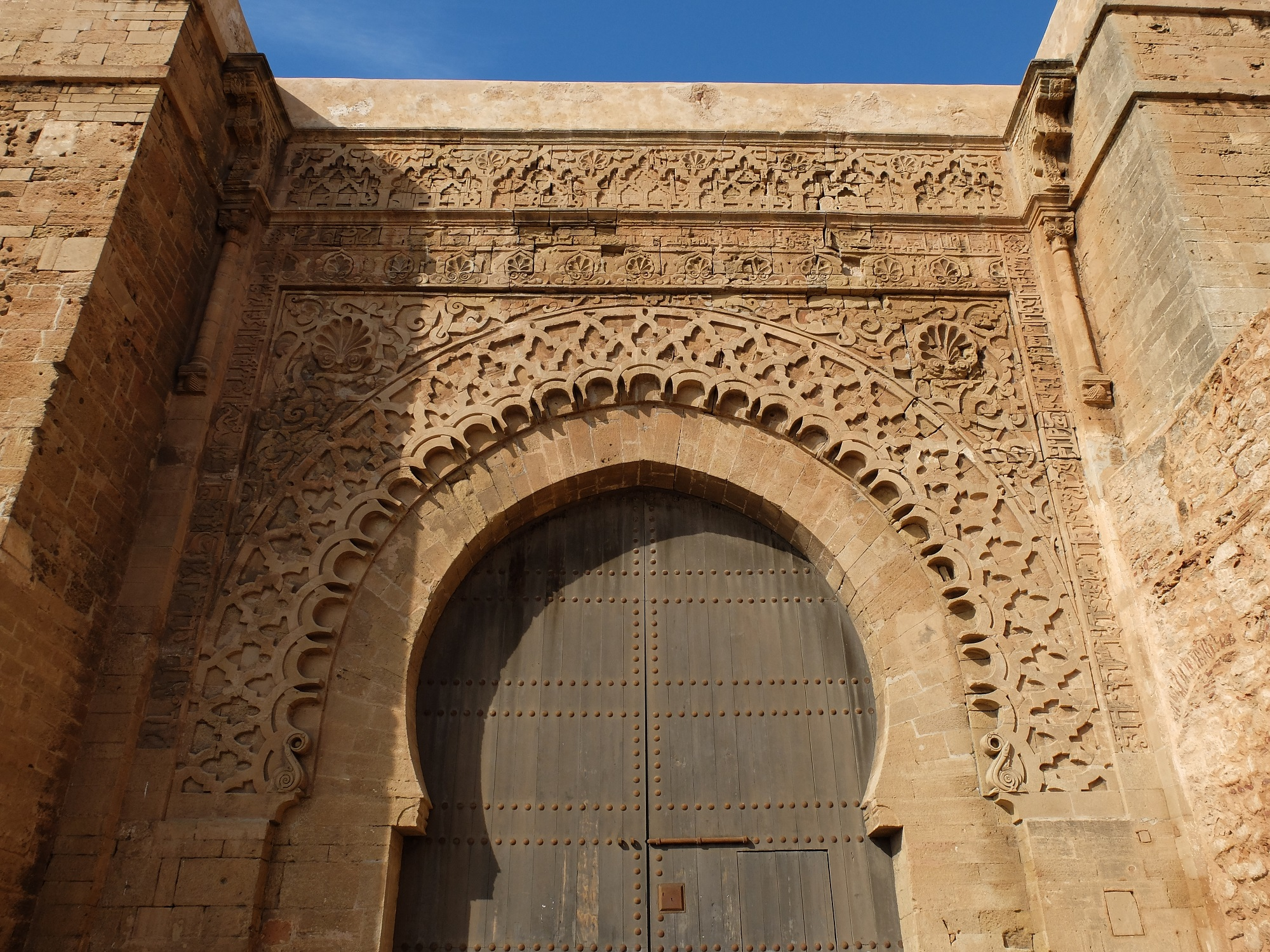
The ceremonial main gate of the Kasbah of the Udayas (in Rabat), added to the fortress by Ya'qub al-Mansur in the late 1190s

Along with the Almoravid period preceding it, the Almohad period is considered one of the most formative stages of Moroccan and Moorish architecture, establishing many of the forms and motifs that were refined in subsequent centuries. The main sites of Almohad architecture and art include Fez, Marrakesh, Rabat and Seville. In general, Almohad architecture was built mostly in rammed earth and brick rather than stone. These two materials were relatively cheap, readily available at most sites, and already widely used in the preceding centuries. Almohad architects refined both the manufacturing process of these materials and their on-site assembly, making the execution of numerous and ambitious construction projects possible. According to scholar Felix Arnold, during the Almohad period "construction became an industry on a scale not seen since Roman times."

Compared to the earlier Almoravid period and the Taifas or Caliphal period in al-Andalus, early Almohad architecture was much more restrained in its ornamentation, focusing its attention on overall architectural forms rather than on detailed surface decoration. In addition to continuing the integration of Moroccan and Andalusi artistic traditions, some currents in Almohad architecture may also reflect influences from Algeria and Tunisia (Ifriqiya). Some Almohad elements, such as polylobed arches, have their earliest precedents in Fatimid architecture in Ifriqiya and Egypt and had also appeared in Andalusi architecture such as the Aljaferia palace. In the Almohad period, this type of arch was further refined for decorative functions while horseshoe arches continued to be standard elsewhere. The decoration around mihrab arches inside mosques also evolved into richer and more monumental forms in the great ceremonial stone gates of Almohad architecture such as Bab Agnaou in Marrakesh and Bab Oudaia and Bab er-Rouah in Rabat. These gates employed varying decorative motifs arranged in concentric semi-circles around the arch of the gate, all of which was in turn framed inside an outer rectangular band with other motifs. This style remained evident in Marinid gateways (e.g. the main gate of Chellah) and in later Moroccan gateways.

The Almohad Kutubiyya and Tinmal mosques are often considered the prototypes of later Moroccan and Andalusi mosques, although the Great Mosque of Taza (later modified by the Marinids) is the oldest surviving Almohad mosque (begun in 1142). Like earlier mosques in the region, Almohad mosques have interiors consisting of large hypostyle halls divided by rows of arches that create a repetitive visual effect. However, the aisle or "nave" leading towards the mihrab (niche symbolizing the qibla in the southern/southeastern wall) and the aisle running along the qibla wall itself were usually wider than the others and were highlighted with distinctive arches and greater decoration. This layout, already present in Almoravid mosques, is often referred to as the "T-plan" by art historians (because the aisle running parallel to the qibla wall and the aisle leading to the mihrab, perpendicular to it, form a "T" shape), and became standard in mosques of the region for centuries. The minarets of Almohad mosques also established the standard form and style of subsequent minarets in the region, with a square base and two-tiered shaft covered in polylobed arch and darj wa ktaf motifs. The minaret of the Kasbah Mosque of Marrakesh was particularly influential and set a style that was repeated, with minor elaborations, in the following Marinid period. The most famous minarets of this time, however, are the minarets of the Kutubiyya Mosque (begun in 1147 by Abd al-Mu'min but subsequently rebuilt before 1195), the Giralda of Seville (part of a Great Mosque begun in 1171 by Abu Ya'qub Yusuf), and the unfinished "Hassan Tower" of Rabat (part of a huge mosque begun by Abu Yusuf Ya'qub al-Mansur in 1191 but never completed).

The Almohads were also prolific builders of fortifications and forts across their realm. They were responsible for building (or rebuilding) the city walls of Córdoba, Seville, Fez, and Taza, as well as many smaller forts and castles across Morocco and southern Spain and Portugal. In Rabat, Abd al-Mu'min built most of the current Kasbah of the Udayas in 1150–1151 (after having destroyed an earlier Almoravid ribat there), while Abu Yusuf Ya'qub al-Mansur embarked on the construction of a vast new capital and citadel on its south side called Ribat al-Fath (for which the enormous unfinished mosque of the Hassan Tower was also intended). While never finished, this project created the current outer walls of the historic center of Rabat, along with multiple gates such as Bab er-Rouah and the ceremonial main gate of the Kasbah of the Udayas. Al-Mansur also created the Kasbah of Marrakesh, a large royal citadel and palace complex to house the caliph's family and administration. The main public entrance of this kasbah was the ornamental gate of Bab Agnaou. In Seville, the Almohads built the Torre del Oro, a defensive tower on the shores of the Guadalquivir River which dates from 1220 to 1221 and remains a landmark of the city today. Likewise, the Calahorra Tower in Córdoba is believed to be an originally Almohad structure designed to defend the river and the city's old bridge.

The Almohad caliphs also constructed multiple country estates just outside the main cities where they resided, continuing a tradition that existed under the Almoravids. The best-known examples of these estates were centered around large water basins or reservoirs that sustained orchards of fruit trees and other plants. Some of them are referred to as al-Buḥayra ("little sea") in Arabic sources, likely in reference to these artificial lakes. Small palaces or pleasure pavilions were built on the edge of the reservoirs. In Marrakesh, the present-day Agdal and Menara gardens both developed from such Almohad creations. In Seville, the remains of the al-Buḥayra garden, founded in 1171, were excavated and partly restored in the 1970s. A similar garden estate was also created in Rabat but has not been found by archaeologists. The Alcázar Genil (originally called al-Qaṣr as-Sayyid) in Granada, created in the late Almohad period and later remodeled by the Nasrids, stood next to an enormous pool on the outskirts of the city. A small ribat, consisting of a square hall covered by a sixteen-sided dome on squinches, was built nearby at the same time and has been preserved today as a Christian hermitage. Sunken gardens were also part of Almohad palace architecture. In some cases the gardens were divided symmetrically into four parts, much like a riyad garden. Examples of these have been found in several courtyards in the Alcázar of Seville, where former Almohad palaces once stood.

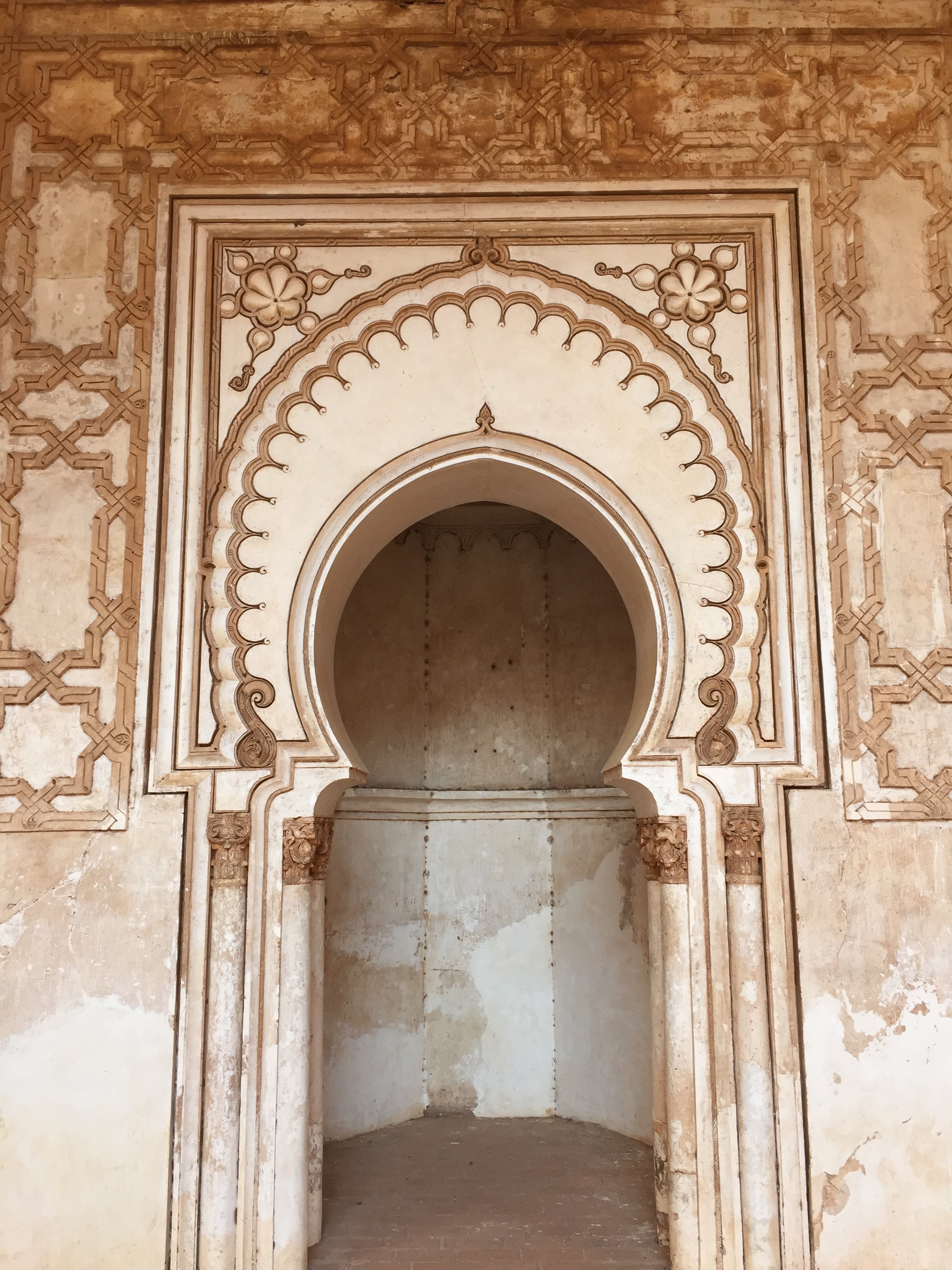
Mihrab of the Great Mosque of Tinmal

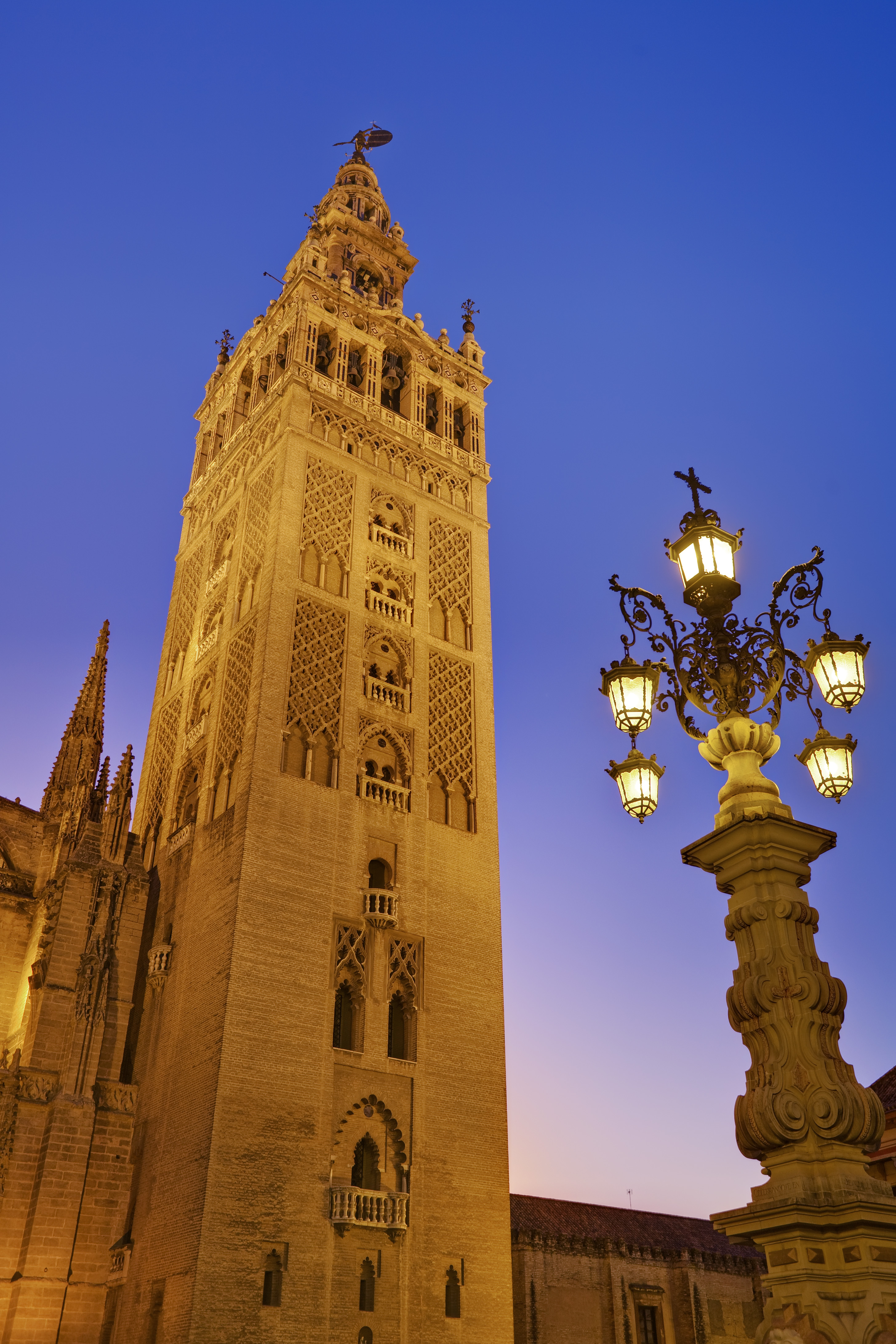
La Giralda, the former minaret of the Great Mosque of Seville, built during the Almohad period

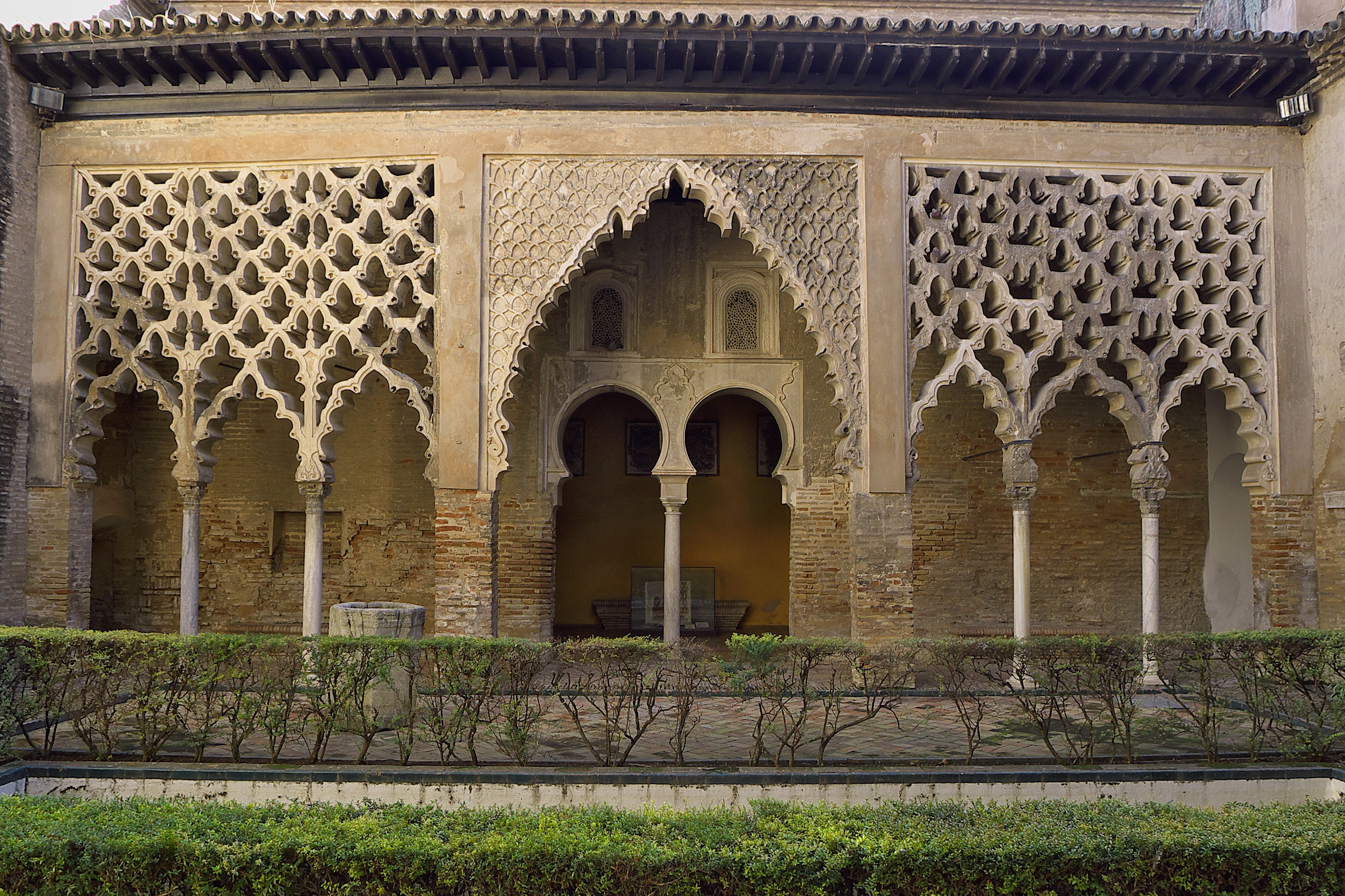
The south portico of the Patio del Yeso of the Alcázar of Seville, built during the Almohad period

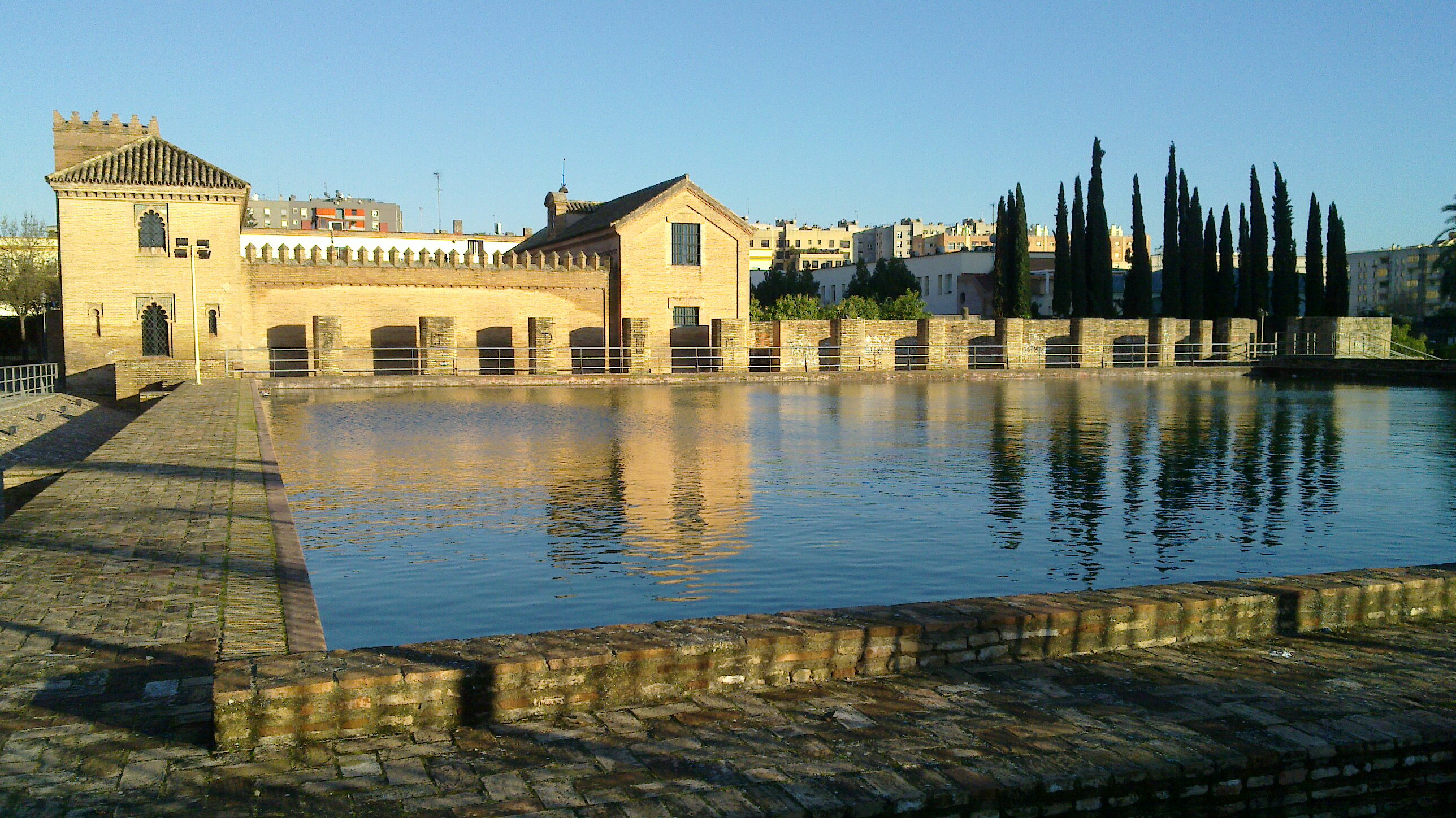
Reservoir of the al-Buḥayra gardens in Seville, with remains of palace structure behind it (partly occupied by later building)

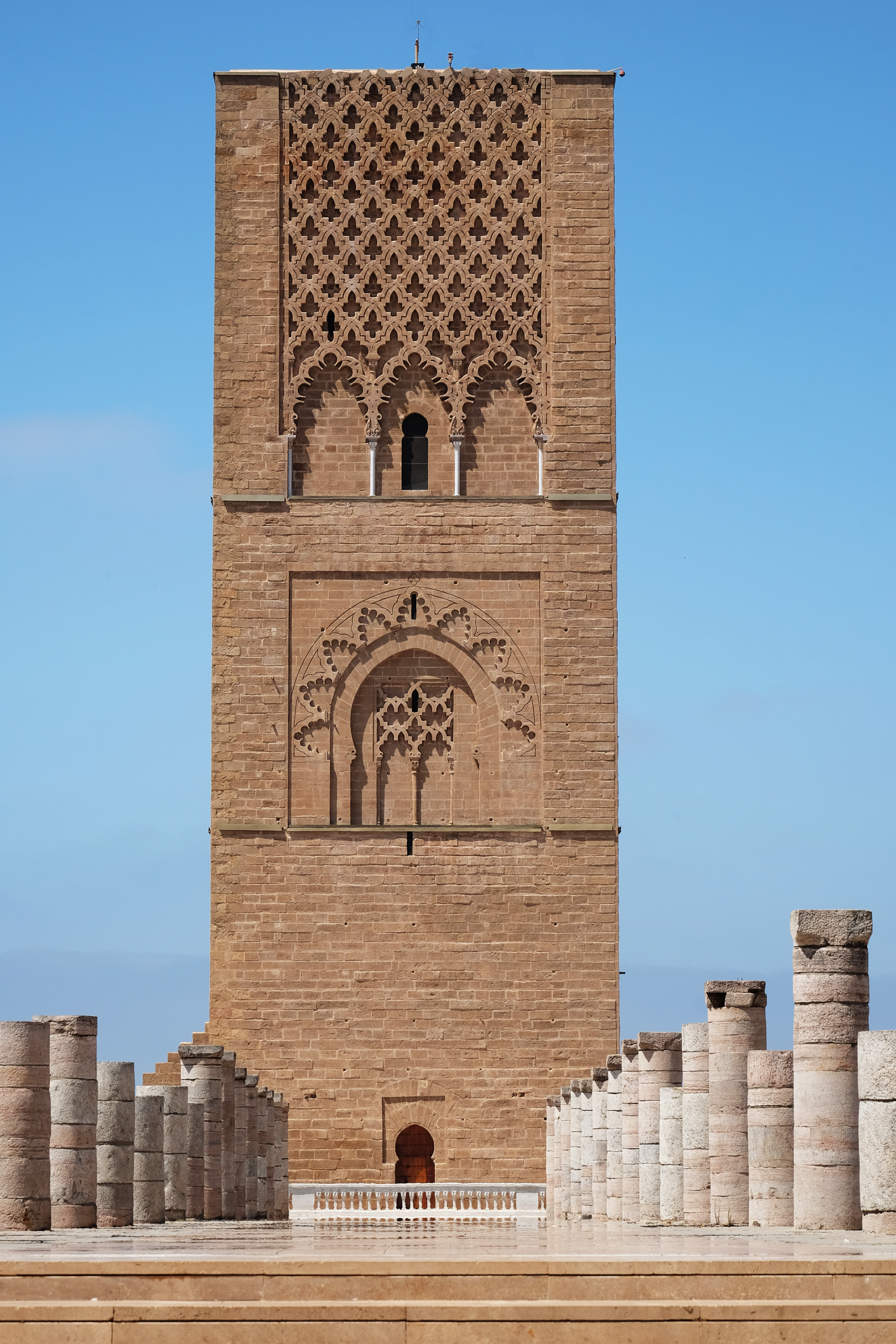
Hassan Tower in Rabat: an incomplete minaret intended for an enormous mosque begun by Ya'qub al-Mansur in the 1190s

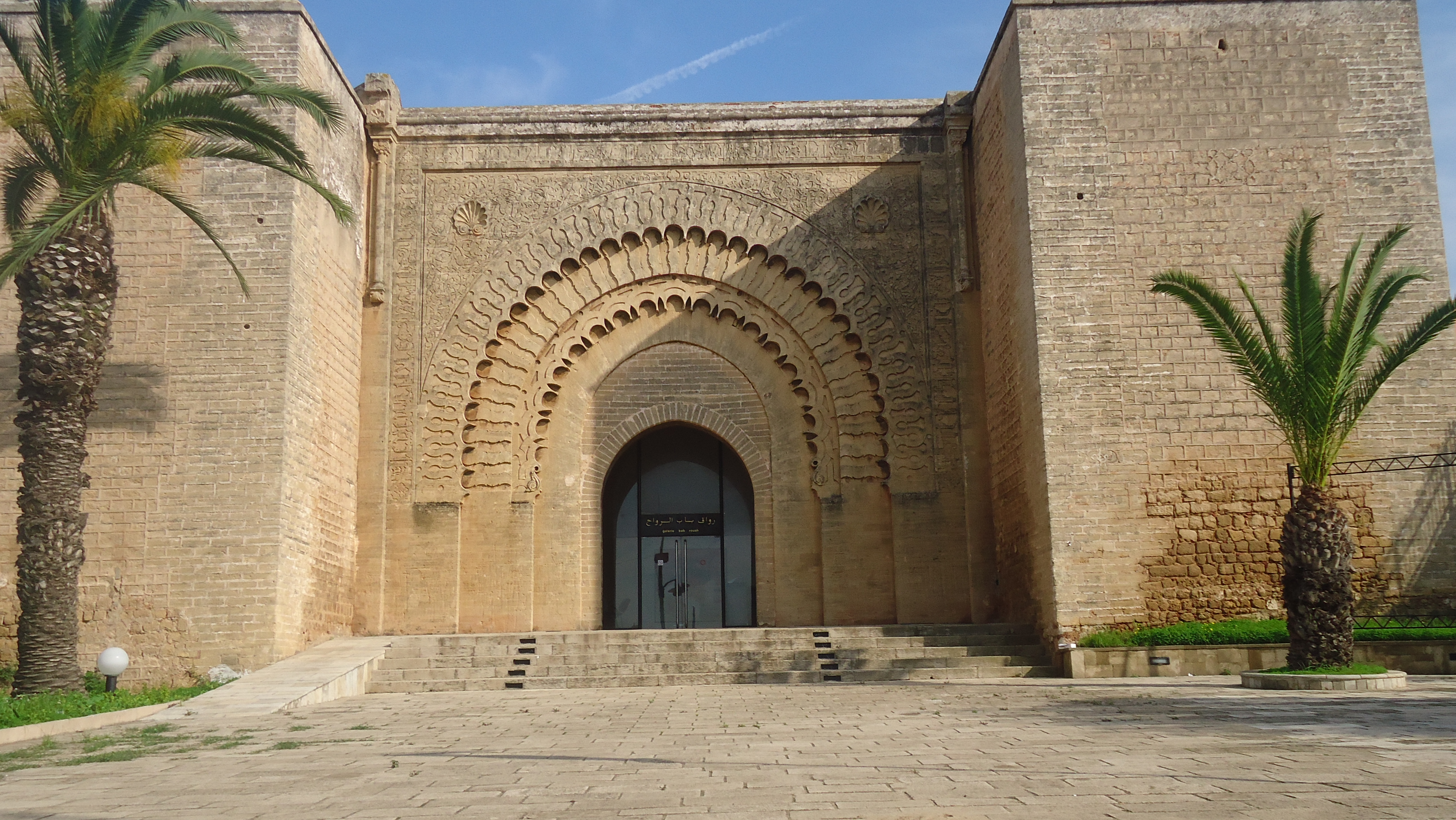
Bab Ruwah ('Gate of the Winds') in Rabat

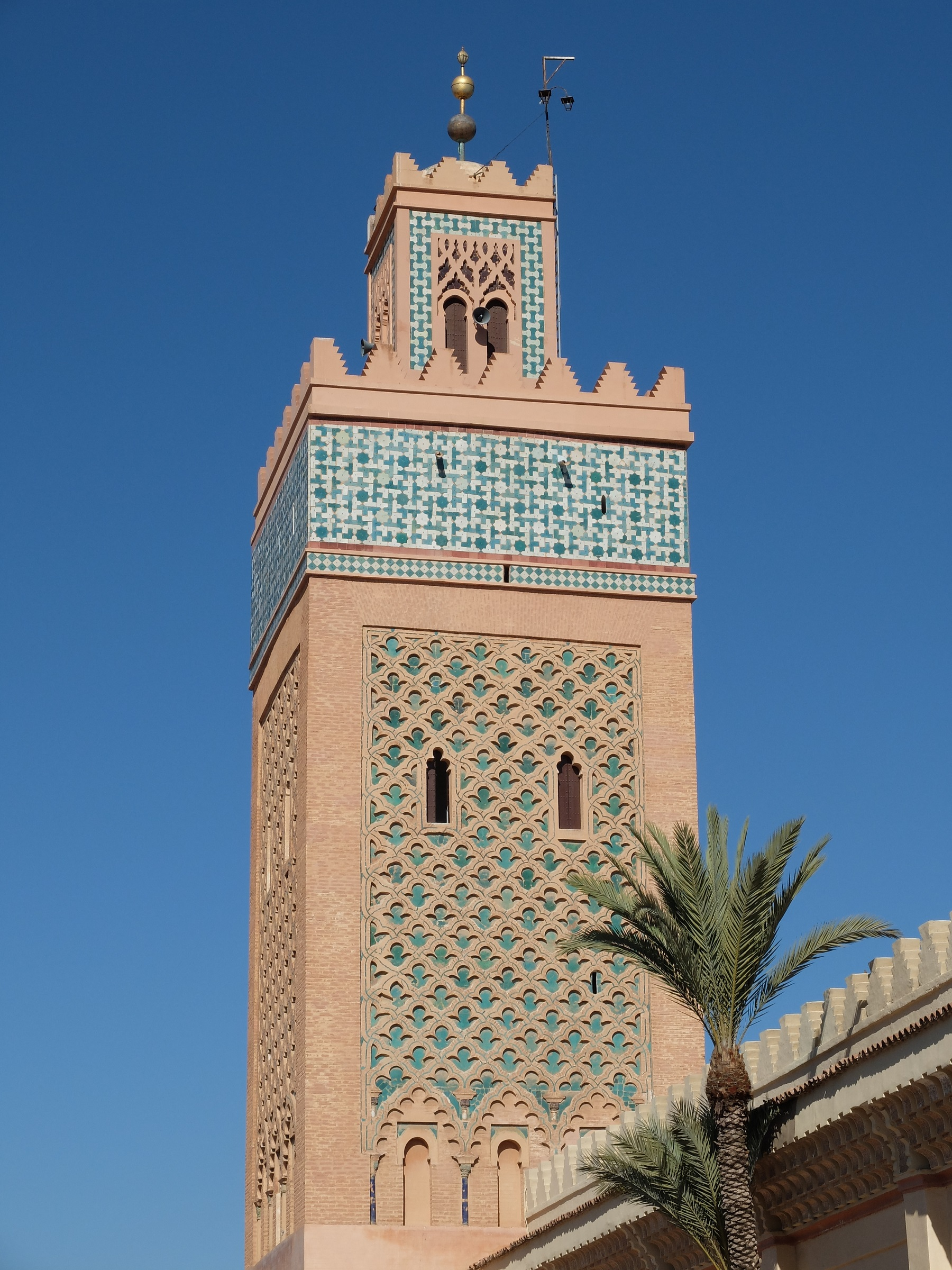
The minaret of the Kasbah Mosque (or Al-Mansuriyya Mosque) in the Kasbah of Marrakesh

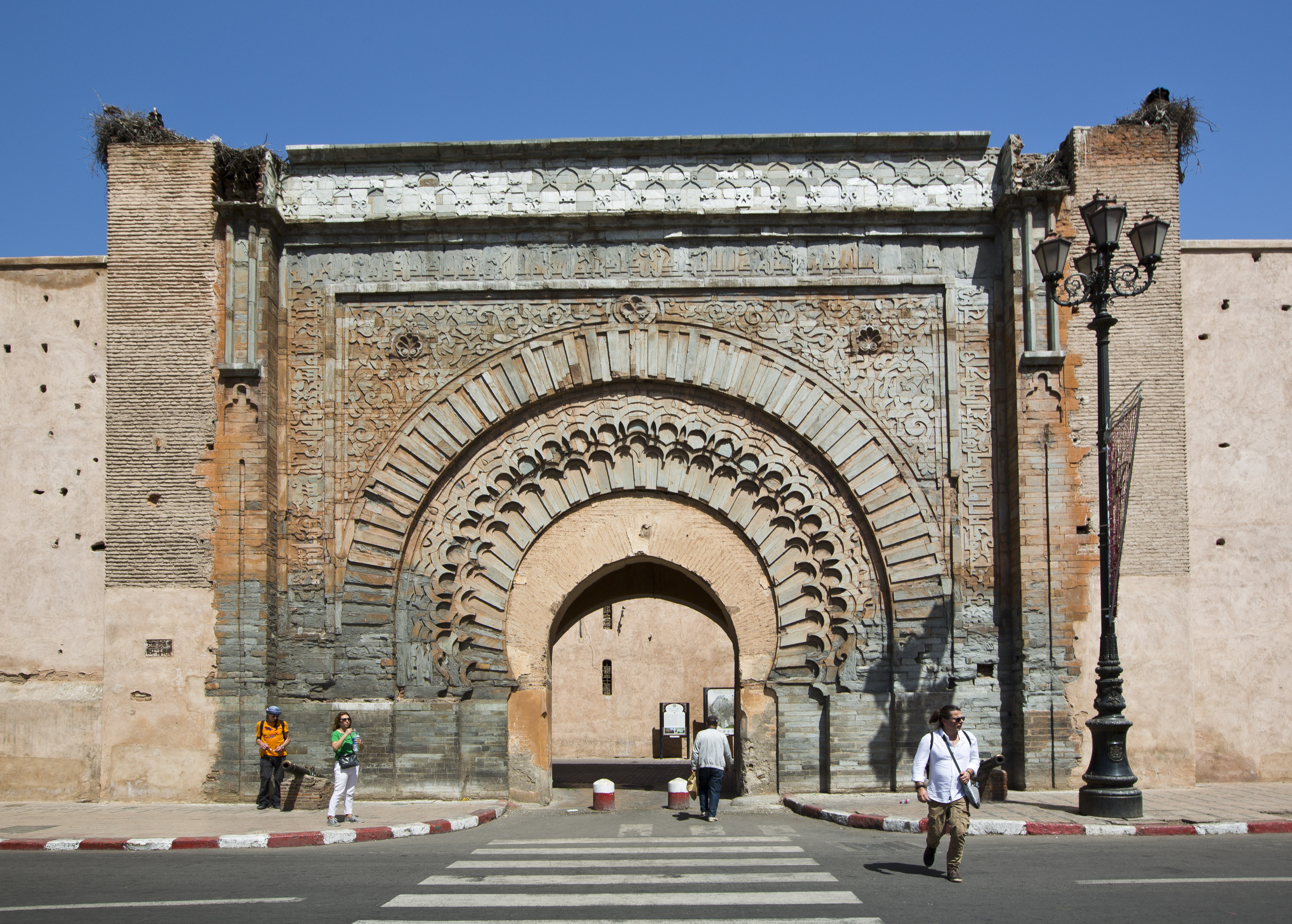
Bab Agnaou, the original public entrance to the Kasbah of Marrakesh

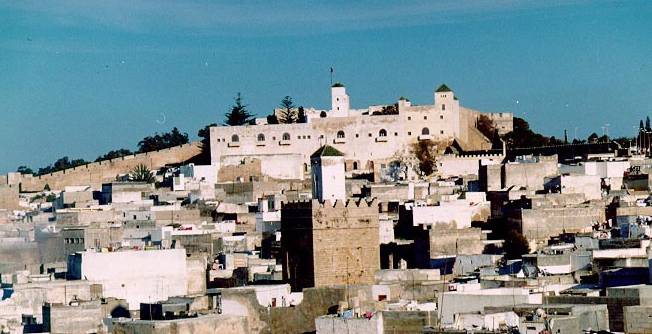
The Almohad minaret in Safi

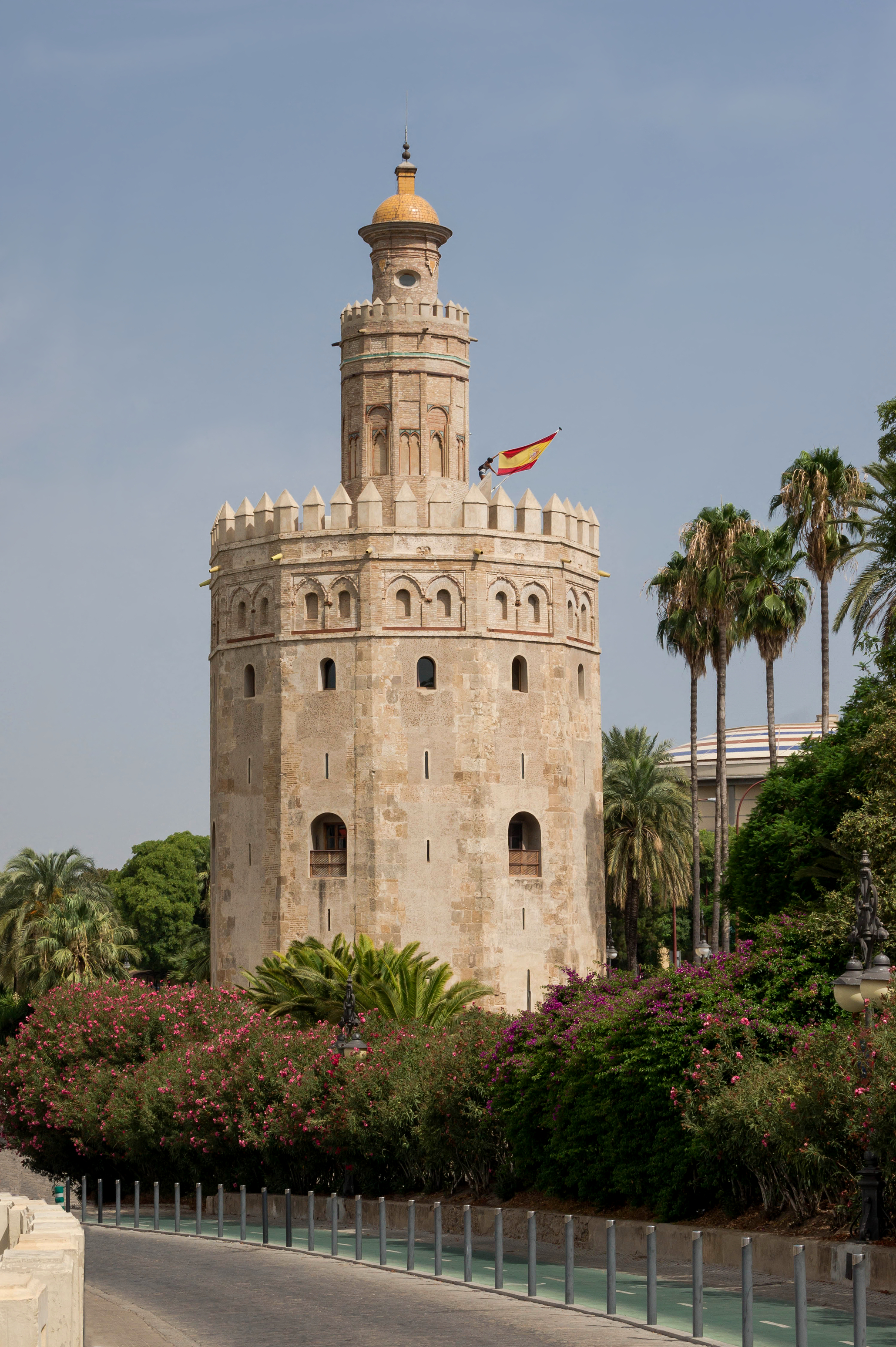
The Torre del Oro in Seville

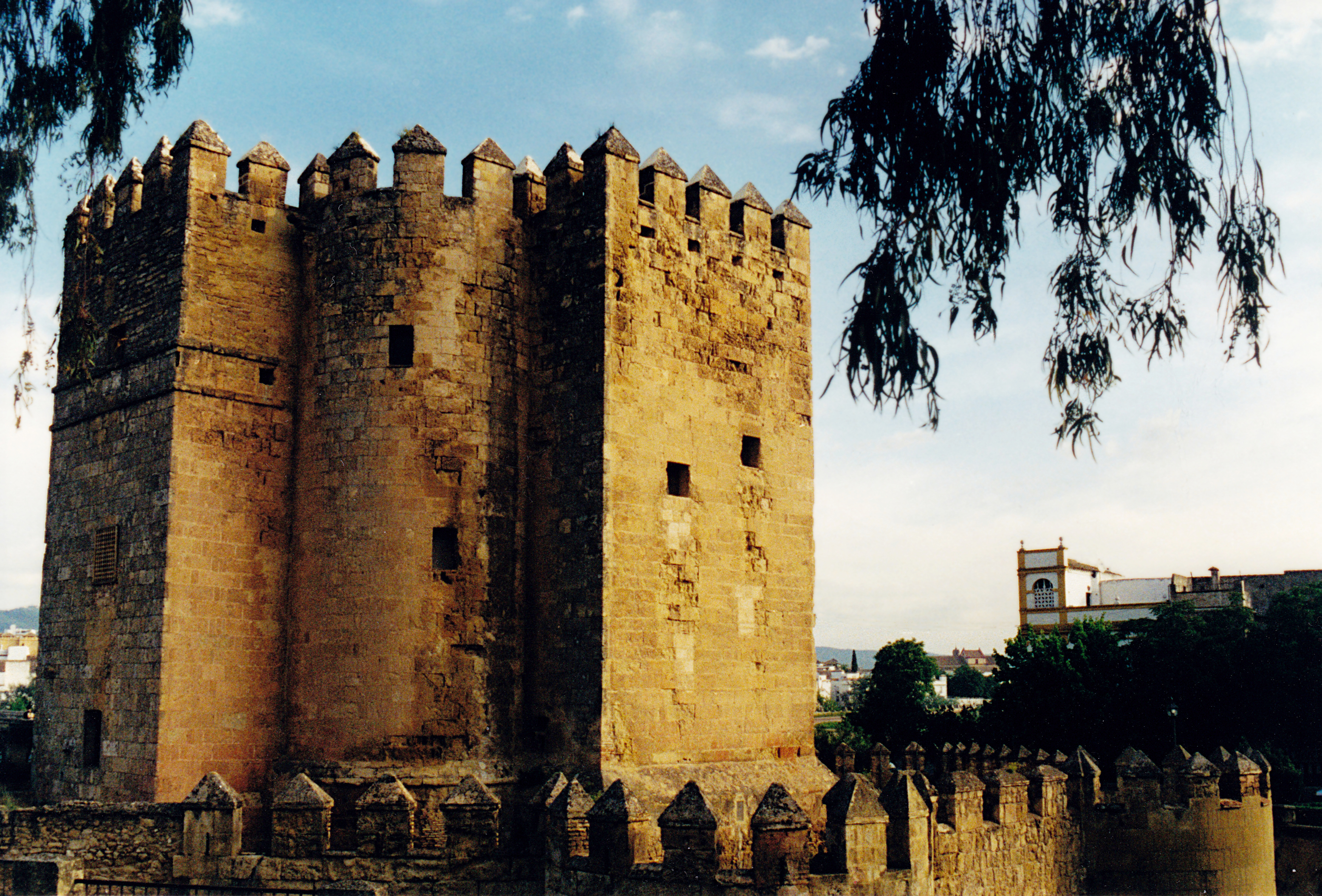
Calahorra Tower in Córdoba

== Status of Non-Muslims ==
Almohad social pyramid according to Ibn al-Qattan

The Almohads had taken control of the Almoravid Maghribi and Andalusian territories by 1147. The Almohads rejected the mainstream Islamic doctrine that established the status of dhimmi, a Non-Muslim resident of a Muslim country who was allowed to practice his religion on condition of submission to Muslim rule and payment of jizya.

The treatment and persecution of Jews under Almohad rule was a drastic change. Prior to Almohad rule during the Caliphate of Córdoba, Jewish culture experienced a Golden Age. María Rosa Menocal, a specialist in Iberian literature at Yale University, has argued that "tolerance was an inherent aspect of Andalusian society", and that the Jewish dhimmis living under the Caliphate, while allowed fewer rights than Muslims, were still better off than in Christian Europe. Many Jews migrated to al-Andalus, where they were not just tolerated but allowed to practice their faith openly. Christians had also practiced their religion openly in Córdoba, and both Jews and Christians lived openly in Morocco as well.

The first Almohad ruler, Abd al-Mumin, allowed an initial seven-month grace period. Then he forced most of the urban dhimmi population in Morocco, both Jewish and Christian, to convert to Islam. In 1198, the Almohad emir Abu Yusuf Yaqub al-Mansur decreed that Jews must wear a dark blue garb, with very large sleeves and a grotesquely oversized hat; his son altered the colour to yellow, a change that may have influenced Catholic ordinances some time later. Those who converted had to wear clothing that identified them as Jews since they were not regarded as sincere Muslims. Cases of mass martyrdom of Jews who refused to convert to Islam are recorded. The treatment and persecution of Christians under Almohad rule was a drastic change as well.

Many of the conversions were superficial. Maimonides urged Jews to choose the superficial conversion over martyrdom and argued, "Muslims know very well that we do not mean what we say, and that what we say is only to escape the ruler's punishment and to satisfy him with this simple confession." Abraham Ibn Ezra (1089–1164), who himself fled the persecutions of the Almohads, composed an elegy mourning the destruction of many Jewish communities throughout Spain and the Maghreb under the Almohads. Many Jews fled from territories ruled by the Almohads to Christian lands, and others, like the family of Maimonides, fled east to more tolerant Muslim lands. However, a few Jewish traders still working in North Africa are recorded.

Idris al-Ma'mun, a late Almohad pretender (ruled 1229–1232 in parts of Morocco), renounced much Almohad doctrine, including the identification of Ibn Tumart as the Mahdi, and the denial of dhimmi status. He allowed Jews to practice their religion openly in Marrakesh and even allowed a Christian church there as part of his alliance with Castile. In Iberia, Almohad rule collapsed in the 1200s and was succeeded by several "Taifa" kingdoms, which allowed Jews to practice their religion openly.

== List of Almohad rulers ==
- Ibn Tumart 1121–1130
- Abd al-Mu'min 1130–1163
- Abu Ya'qub Yusuf I 1163–1184
- Abu Yusuf Ya'qub 'al-Mansur' 1184–1199
- Muhammad al-Nasir 1199–1213
- Abu Ya'qub Yusuf II 'al-Mustansir' 1213–1224
- Abu Muhammad Abd al-Wahid I 'al-Makhlu' 1224
- Abdallah al-Adil 1224–1227
- Yahya 'al-Mutasim' 1227–1229
- Abu al-Ala Idris I al-Ma'mun, 1229–1232
- Abu Muhammad Abd al-Wahid II 'al-Rashid' 1232–1242
- Abu al-Hassan Ali 'al-Said' 1242–1248
- Abu Hafs Umar 'al-Murtada', 1248–1266
- Abu al-Ula (Abu Dabbus) Idris II 'al-Wathiq' 1266–1269

== Almohad family tree ==
Ali al-Kumi
Abd al-Mu'min (1)
Muhammad	Abu Yaqub Yusuf I (2)	Abu al-Hassan Ali	Abu Zayd Abd al-Rahman	Abu Zakariya Abd al-Rahman	Abu Abd al-Rahman Yaqub	Abu Ibrahim Ismail	Abu Said Uthman	Abu Ali al-Hussein	Abu Muhammad Abd Allah	Abu Musa Isa	Abu Ishaq Ibrahim	Abu al-Rabi Sulayman	Abu Imran Musa	Abu Hafs Umar
Abu Yusuf Yaqub 'al-Mansur' (3)	Abu al-Ula Idris the Old	Abu Yahya	Abu Ishaq Ibrahim	Abu Hafs Umar 'al-Rashid'	Abu Zayd Muhammad	Abu Muhammad Abd al-Wahid I 'al-Makhlu' (6)	Abu Ibrahim Ishaq 'al-Tahir'	Abu Zayd Abd al-Rahman	Abu Zakariya Yahya	Abu al-Hassan Ali	Abu Yusuf Yaqub	Abu al-Rabi Sulayman	Abu Abd Allah Muhammad
Muhammad al-Nasir (4)	Abdallah al-Adil (7)	Abu Muhammad Said	Abu Musa	Ibrahim	Abu Said	Abu al-Ala Idris I 'al-Ma'mun' (9)	Abu Hafs Umar 'al-Murtada' (12)	Abu Zayd	Abu Ishaq	Abu Dabbus Idris II 'al-Wathiq' (13)	Abu Ali	Abd Allah 'al-Bayyansi'	Abu Zayd
Yahya 'al'Mutasim' (8)	Musa	Zakariya	Ali	Yusuf II 'al'Mustansir' (5)	Abu al-Hassan Ali 'al-Said' (11)	Abu Muhammad Abd al-Wahid II 'al-Rashid' (10)

== See also ==
- List of Mahdi claimants
- Mahdist War

== Sources ==
- Abun-Nasr, Jamil (1987). A history of the Maghrib in the Islamic period. Cambridge: Cambridge University Press. ISBN 0521337674.
- Arnold, Felix (2017). Islamic Palace Architecture in the Western Mediterranean: A History. Oxford University Press. ISBN 9780190624552.
- Baadj, Amar S. (2015). Saladin, the Almohads and the Banū Ghāniya: The Contest for North Africa (12th and 13th centuries). Brill. ISBN 978-90-04-29857-6.
- Bel, Alfred (1903). Les Benou Ghânya: Derniers Représentants de l'empire Almoravide et Leur Lutte Contre l'empire Almohade. Paris: E. Leroux.
- Bennison, Amira K. (2007). Cities in the Pre-Modern Islamic World The Urban Impact of Religion, State and Society. Routledge. ISBN 978-1-134-09650-3.
- Bennison, Amira K. (2016). The Almoravid and Almohad Empires. Edinburgh University Press. ISBN 9780748646821.
- Bloom, Jonathan M. (2020). Architecture of the Islamic West: North Africa and the Iberian Peninsula, 700–1800. Yale University Press. ISBN 9780300218701.
- Coppée, Henry (1881). Conquest of Spain by the Arab-Moors. Boston: Little, Brown. OCLC 13304630.
- Dodds, Jerrilynn D., ed. (1992). Al-Andalus: The Art of Islamic Spain. New York: The Metropolitan Museum of Art. ISBN 0-87099-637-1.
- Dozy, Reinhart (1881). History of the Almohades (2nd ed.). Leiden: Brill. OCLC 13648381.
- Fromherz, Allen J. (2010). The Almohads: The Rise of an Islamic Empire. Bloomsbury Publishing. ISBN 978-0-85771-207-3.
- Goldziher, Ignác (1903). Le livre de Mohammed ibn Toumert: Mahdi des Almohades (PDF). Alger: P. Fontana.
- Kennedy, Hugh N. (1996). Muslim Spain and Portugal: A Political History of al-Andalus. New York: Longman. pp. 196–266. ISBN 978-0-582-49515-9.
- Lintz, Yannick; Déléry, Claire; Tuil Leonetti, Bulle, eds. (2014). Maroc médiéval: Un empire de l'Afrique à l'Espagne (in French). Paris: Louvre éditions. ISBN 9782350314907.
- Magill, Frank Northen; Aves, Alison (1998). Dictionary of World Biography: The Middle Ages. Routledge. ISBN 9781579580414 – via Google Books.
- Marçais, Georges (1954). L'architecture musulmane d'Occident. Paris: Arts et métiers graphiques.
- Julien, Charles André (1970). History of North Africa: Tunisia, Algeria, Morocco, from the Arab Conquest to 1830. Routledge & K. Paul. ISBN 978-0-7100-6614-5.
- Popa, Marcel D.; Matei, Horia C. (1988). Mica Enciclopedie de Istorie Universala. Bucharest: Editura Politica. OCLC 895214574.
- Buresi, Pascal; Aallaoui, Hicham El (2012-11-15). Governing the Empire: Provincial Administration in the Almohad Caliphate (1224-1269): Critical Edition, Translation, and Study of Manuscript 4752 of the Ḥasaniyya Library in Rabat Containing 77 Taqādīm (“Appointments”). Translated by Bruce, Travis. Brill. ISBN 978-90-04-23971-5.
