= Hintata =

Berber Tribal Confederation

Hintata Hin Tata
- Tribal confederation
- Ethnicity: Berber (Masmuda)
- Location: Marrakesh, Morocco
- Demonym: Hintati
- Branches: Banu (Ait) Galgaʾiya, Banu (Ait) Lamazdur, Banu (Ait) Tagurtant, Banu (Ait) Taklawwuh-tin, Banu (Ait) Talwuh-rit, Banu (Ait) Tumsidin, Banu (Ait) Wawazgit, Banu (Ait) Yigaz, and their allies the Mazala

The Hintata or Hin Tata were a Berber tribal confederation belonging to the tribal group Masmuda of the High Atlas, Morocco. They were historically known for their political power in the region of Marrakesh between the twelfth century and sixteenth century. Having helped the Almohads come to power, the Hintata have always been very close to the Almohad caliphs and during the Marinid period, controlled the region of Marrakesh from the Jabal Hintata, in the High Atlas, coming to reign independently on fifteenth century and early sixteenth century. The Hafsid dynasty of Tunis were a descendant of the Hintata.

== Branches ==
The hintata were composed of nine clans. These clans were the Banu (Ait) Galgaʾiya, the Banu (Ait) Lamazdur, the Banu (Ait) Tagurtant, the Banu (Ait) Taklawwuh-tin, the Banu (Ait) Talwuh-rit, the Banu (Ait) Tumsidin, the Banu (Ait) Wawazgit, the Banu (Ait) Yigaz, and their allies the Mazala.

== History ==
=== Almohad era ===
The Hintata entered the historical scene at the beginning of the twelfth century, when their principal sheikhs, Wanudin ibn Yansilt, Namir ibn Dawud, Abu Magalifa and Faska U-Mzal, supported the Almohad Mahdi, Ibn Tumart, from 1123. The latter, Faska, henceforth got his name changed by the Almohad Mahdi to the name of a famous companion of the Islamic Prophet Muhammad and, under his new name of Abu Hafs Umar ibn Yahya, contributed to the triumph of the Almohads, occupying important positions in their government—having been mainly the closest collaborator of caliph 'Abd al-Mu'min—until his death in 1181. This hintata sheikh, Abu Hafs 'Umar, was the ancestor of the Hafsids—his grandson, Abu Zakariyya Yahya was the founder of this dynasty—the governors of Tunis since 1224, where they settled as an independent dynasty from 1229 to 1573.

The Hintata formed an elite military unit in the Almohad armies, which participated in the Almohad expansion in North Africa and the Al-andalus. They also passed in al-Andalus, where they are expressly mentioned participating in some campaigns, like the Siege of Santarém in 1184, conducted with troops brought from the Maghreb by the caliph Abu Ya'qub, who ended with his defeat and his death in front of Santarem. However, the presence of the Hintata did not leave any trace in the toponymy of the Iberian Peninsula. The Hintata were involved in dynastic struggles between Almohad claimants in the first half of the 13th century. A grandson of the hintati sheikh Abu Hafs Umar, called Ibn al Shahid, supported from the Maghreb the Almohad caliph al-'Adil, insurgent in Murcia in 1224, until he occupied Marrakesh, where he was murdered in 1227. Then Ibn al-Shahid proposed Yahya ibn al-Nasir as caliph, withdrawing his previous agreement with al-Ma'mun, who, when he entered Marrakesh in 1229, ordered the execution of a hundred sheikhs, in particular of the Hintata and Tinmal, as well as their families.

=== Marinid era ===
After the fall of the Almohad, the Hintata retained their power since one of their families, the Awlad Yunus, a family that seems to descend from the Almohad general Abu Hafs 'Umar, rendered political and fiscal services to the Marinids. After being defeated in the civil war with his son Sultan Abu Inan Faris in 1350, the marinid sultan Abu al-Hasan Ali ibn Othman took refuge in jabal Hintata, where he was protected by 'Amir ibn Muhammad ibn 'Ali, the sheikh of Hintāta, the dethroned Sultan died at Jabal Hintata the following year. When the Sultan Abu 'Inan died in 1358, the kingdom was divided between several of his sons. The south of the Maghreb fell to Muhammad al-Mu'tamid who settled in Marrakesh, supported and advised by this sheikh of the Hintata, 'Amir, who in 1360 received the visit, in the "Hintata mountain", of the vizier and writer Ibn al-Khatib, who gave a complimentary description of him and his people, "supporters of the da'wa [Almohad], close friends of the Marinid dynasty".

Later, in return for their participation in the dynastic intrigues of Marinids, Sheikh 'Amir was officially recognized as "governor of the whole of the Maghreb beyond Umm Rabbi'a" by the powerful vizier al-Yabani, a title he held until 1362. At the same time, the marinid vizier entrusted him with the custody of the prince Abu l-Fadl, who had been charged with governing Marrakesh. Thus was set up, under the protection of the Marinids, an era of domination of the south of the Maghreb by the Hintata. They were under the direction of the Awlad Yunus branch which, along with other local dynasties, "ruled in the mountains to the account of the Sultan while waiting to make themselves independent ". In fact, 'Amir eventually rose up against the Marinids who arrested him and then executed him in 1370. However, his family managed to stay at the head of the tribe, more and more detached from the central power, which was gradually declining.

=== Saadid era ===
The Hintata, "kings of Marrakesh", saw their power reduced to this single city and its surrounding territory, while they had to face, without much success, the Portuguese. On 23 April 1515, Nuno Fernandes de Ataide, led an unsuccessful attack on Marrakesh, because of the support of Saadians. These latter dynasty allowed the Hintata to maintain their power over the city for another ten years, until they themselves occupied Marrakesh, killing Muḥammad ibn al-Nasir Bu-Shantuf, the last Hintata amir, whose family was sent to Taroudant. The Hintata have since disappeared from Maghrebi historical sources and the traces of this confederation vanished.

=== Modern era ===
In contemporary times, the name "Hintata" is no longer used in Morocco where, nevertheless, some of their clans, as is the case of Gaygāya, who in turn acquired the quality of a tribe. Some families still retain the traditional memory of their belonging to the Hintata, especially in the city of Sfax, Tunisia.

== Bibliography ==
- Buresi, Pascal; Aallaoui, Hicham El (2013). Governing the Empire: Provincial Administration in the Almohad Caliphate (1224-1269). Translated by Bruce, Travis. BRILL. ISBN 9789004239715.
- Deverdun, G. (1986) [1971]. "Hintāta". In Lewis, B.; Ménage, V. L.; Pellat, C.; Schacht, J. (eds.). Encyclopaedia of Islam. Vol. III (2nd ed.). Leiden, Netherlands: E. J. BRILL. ISBN 9004081186.
- Fromherz, Allen J. (2010). The Almohads: The Rise of an Islamic Empire. I.B. Tauris. ISBN 9781780764054.
- Idris, H. R. (1986) [1971]. "Ḥafṣids". In Lewis, B.; Ménage, V. L.; Pellat, C.; Schacht, J. (eds.). Encyclopaedia of Islam. Vol. III (2nd ed.). Leiden, Netherlands: E. J. BRILL. ISBN 9004081186.
- Viguera-Molins, M.-J. (2000). "Hin Tata". In Camps, Gabriel (ed.). Encyclopédie berbère. Vol. 23 | Hiempsal – Icosium. Aix-en-Provence: Edisud. ISBN 2744902071.
