= Ibn al-Qattan =

Scholar from Fez

Personal life
- Born: Ali ibn Muhammad ibn Abd al-Malik ibn Yahya; 1166 Fez
- Died: 1231 (aged 64–65) Sijilmasa
- Notable work(s): Kitab al-nazar fi ahkam al-nazar bi-hassat al-basar, Bayan al-Wahm wa al-iham al-waqi'in fi kitab al-ahkam
- Occupation: Imam, Hadith Scholar, Intellectual

Religious life
- Religion: Islam

Abu al-Hasan Ali ibn Muhammad ibn Abd al-Malik ibn Yahya (Arabic: أبو الحسن علي بن محمد بن عبد الملك بن يحيى; 1166–1231), better known as Ibn al-Qattan al-Fasi (Arabic: ابن القطان الفاسي) was an imam, a hadith scholar and one of the leading intellectuals of the time of the Almohads. He was born in Fez (in present-day Morocco) and died in Sijilmasa. He is the author of Kitab al-nazar fi ahkam al-nazar bi-hassat al-basar and Bayan al-Wahm wa al-iham al-waqi'in fi kitab al-ahkam.

== See also ==
- Muhammad ibn Yusuf al-Warraq
