= Abd al-Mu'min =

Founder and Caliph of the Almohad Caliphate from 1133 to 1163

Abd al-Mu'min عبد المؤمن
- Khalīfa ʾAmīr al-Muʾminīn; Imām
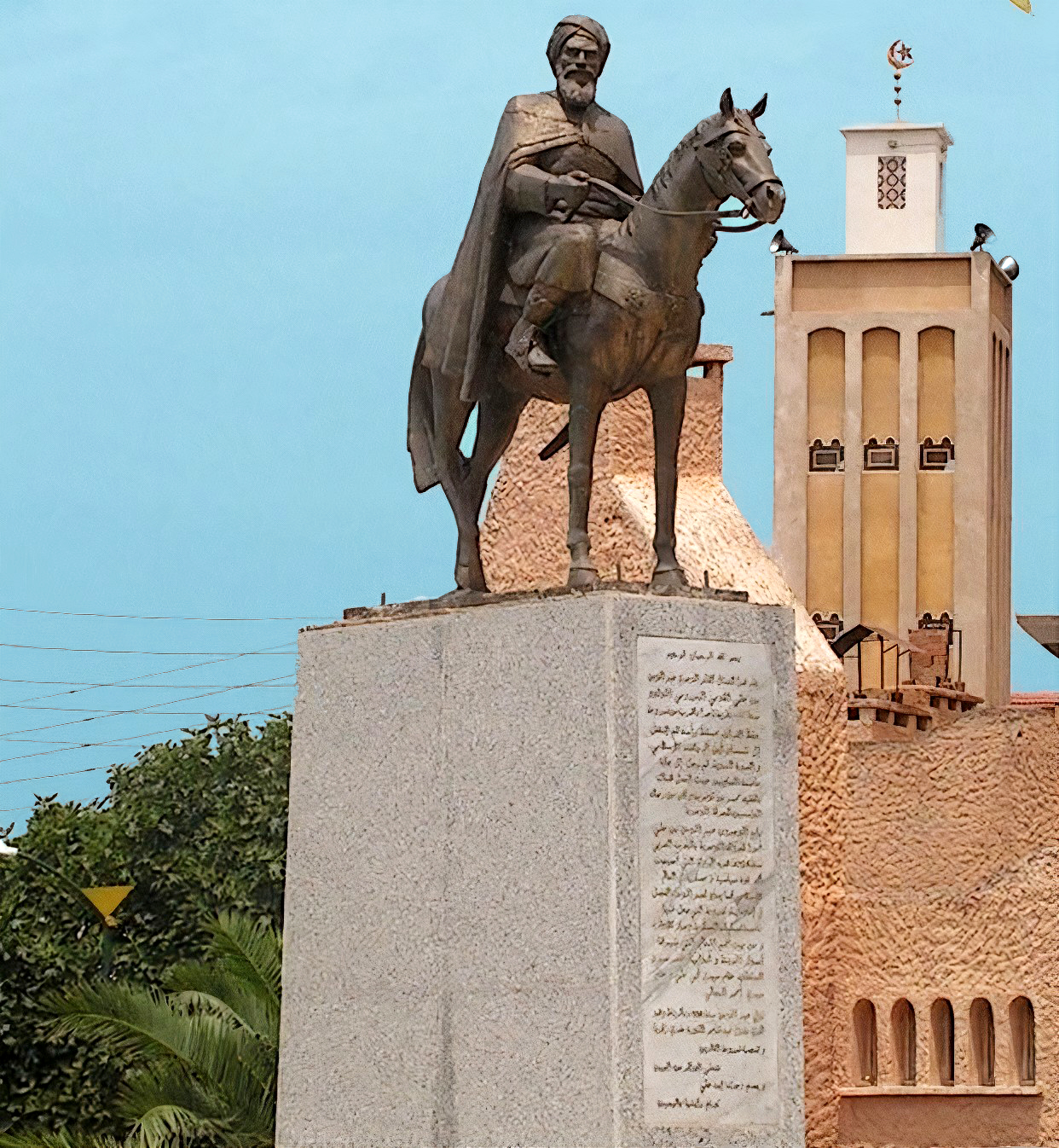
- Statue of Abd al Mumin in Nedroma, Algeria

Ruler of the Almohad Caliphate
- Reign: 1133–1163
- Successor: Abu Yaqub Yusuf
- Born: c. 1094; Tagra, Tlemcen, Hammadid kingdom
- Died: 1163 (aged c. 69); Salé, Almohad Caliphate
- Spouse: Safiya bint Abi Imran
- Issue: Abu Yaqub Yusuf; Aisha bint Abd al-Mu'min
Names
- Abd al-Mu'min ibn Ali al-Kumi
- Dynasty: Almohad
- Father: Ali ibn Makhluf al-Kumi
- Mother: Ta'lu bint Atiyya ibn al-Khayr
- Religion: Islam

ʿAbd al-Muʾmin (Arabic: عبد المؤمن; (Note: Full name: Abū Muḥammad ʿAbd al-Muʾmin ibn ʿAlī ibn ʿAlwī ibn Yaʿlā al-Kūmī (Arabic: أبو محمد عبد المؤمن بن علي بن علوي بن يعلى الكومي)) c. 1094–1163) was a prominent member of the Almohad movement. Although the Almohad movement itself was founded by Ibn Tumart, Abd al-Mu'min was the founder of the ruling dynasty and creator of the Almohad empire. As a leader of the Almohad movement he became the first Caliph of the Almohad Empire in 1133, after the death in 1130 of the movement's founder, Ibn Tumart, and ruled until his death in 1163. Abd al-Mu'min put his predecessor's doctrine of Almohadism into practice, defeated the Almoravids, and extended his rule across Al-Andalus (on the Iberian Peninsula) and as far as Tunis in Ifriqiya (present-day Tunisia), thus bringing the Maghreb in North Africa and Al-Andalus in Europe under one creed and one government.

== Early life ==
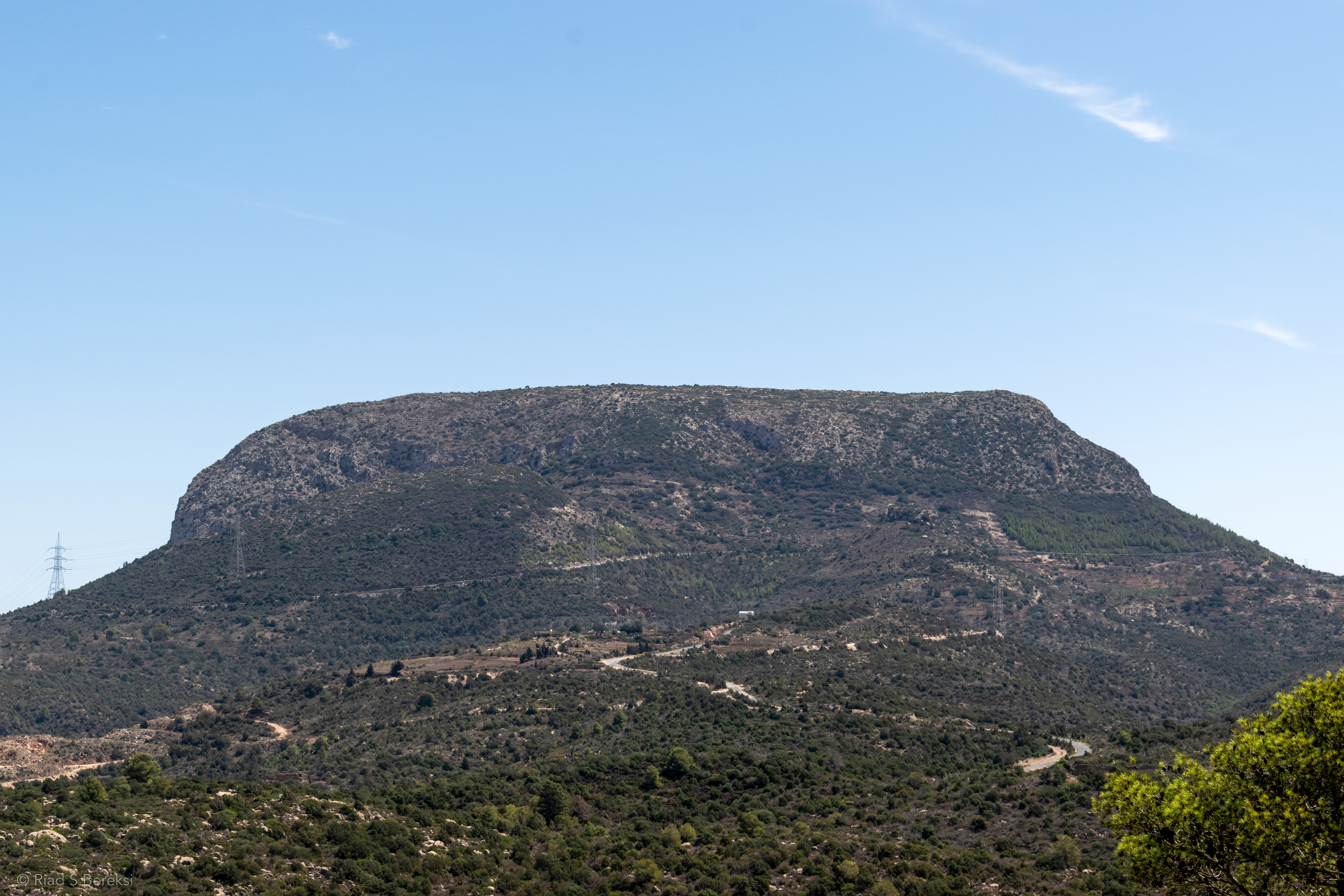
Mount Tajra, the highest point of the Eastern Trara mountains range, where Abd al-Mu'min was born, in Tlemcen Province

Abd al-Mu'min was born in the village of Tagra, near Tlemcen, in the Kingdom of the Hammadids, present-day Algeria, into the Kumiya tribe, an Arabized section of the Berber Zenata tribal confederation. This tribe settled in the north of what is now the province of Oran, not far from Nedroma. His father was a potter from Nedroma.

While young, Abd al-Mu'min went to Tlemcen to learn the Fiqh. His tutor died before he could complete his study. He then was made aware of a learned and pious Faqih called Feqih Soussi (later known as Ibn Tumart) who was travelling from the east on his way to his native land in Tinmel, present-day Morocco. Abd al-Mu'min and his peers wanted to convince Ibn Tumart to settle in Tlemcen, so he was sent to Ibn Tumart with a letter from the students inviting him to come to their land. The two met at Mellala near Bejaïa. Ibn Tumart turned down the invitation, but Abd al-Mu'min stayed with him and they continued the journey together to Morocco.

== Political life ==
=== Under Ibn Tumart ===
Some time around 1117, Abd al-Mu'min became a follower of Ibn Tumart, leader of the Masmudas (a Berber tribe of present-day western Morocco), a religious and military leader of renowned piety who had founded the Almohads as a religious order with the goal of restoring purity in Islam. His group had long been at odds with the Almoravids and had been forced into exile in the mountains. Abd al-Mu'min stayed with Ibn Tumart as he journeyed slowly towards Marrakesh. It was there that his mentor declared himself the Mahdi (divinely guided one) and that he was opposed to the Almoravid dynasty. After this pronouncement, the group moved to the Atlas Mountains and gathered followers there. In time they created a small Almohad state. During an attack on Marrakesh, al-Bashir the second in command, was killed and Abd al-Mu'min was named to take his place.

=== Accession ===
When Ibn Tumart died in 1130 at his ribat in Tinmel, after suffering a severe defeat at the hands of the Almoravids, Abd al-Mu'min and the council of ten kept the death of Ibn Tumart secret for 3 years, since the Almohads were going through a difficult time in their fight against the Almoravids. Abd al-Mu'min also feared that the Masmuda (the Berber tribe of Ibn Tumart) would not accept him as their leader since he was an outsider. He did eventually lead the Almohads when a family relationship was arranged between him and Cheikh Abu Hafs, the leader of the Masmuda. He then came forward as the lieutenant of Ibn Tumart, became the leader of the movement, and forged it into a powerful military force. He proclaimed himself Caliph, with the titles of Khalifat al-Mahdi ('Representative of the Mahdi') and later – probably after the conquest of Marrakesh – of Amir al-Mu'minin ('Prince/Commander of the Believers'). He eventually adopted an Arab Qaysi genealogy that included the prophet Muhammad. Under him, the Almohads swept down from the mountains, eventually destroying the power of the faltering Almoravid dynasty by 1147.

=== War against the Almoravids ===
Abd al-Mu'min created his empire by first winning control of the high Atlas Mountains, then the Middle Atlas, into the Rif region, eventually moving into his homeland north of Tlemcen. In 1145, after the Almoravids lost the leader of their Catalan mercenaries, Reveter, the Almohads defeated them in open battle. From this point the Almohads moved west onto the Atlantic coastal plain. After laying siege to Marrakesh, they finally captured it in 1147. Traditional accounts state that after establishing his capital at Marrakesh, Abd al-Mu'min created a dilemma in that the Almohads considered it a city of heretics. He contented himself with the destruction of their palace and mosques, although it is not clear whether these were actually demolished or merely abandoned.

=== Expansion ===
The Almohads' involvement in Al-Andalus began as early as 1145, when Ali ibn Isa ibn Maymun, the Almoravid naval commander of Cadiz, defected to 'Abd al-Mu'min. In the same year, Ibn Qasi, the ruler of Silves, was one of the first Andalusian leaders to appeal for Almohad intervention in Al-Andalus in order to stop the advance of the Christian kingdoms, whom the faltering Almoravids were unable to contain. In 1147 Abd al-Mu'min sent a military force led by another Almoravid defector, Abu Ishaq Barraz, who captured Algeciras and Tarifa before moving west to Niebla, Badajoz, and the Algarve. The Almoravids in Seville were besieged in 1147 until the city was captured in 1148 with local support.

Around this time a major rebellion centred in the Sous valley, led by Muhammad ibn 'Abd Allah al-Massi, shook the Almohad Empire and took on religious dimensions, rallying various tribes to counter the Almohads. Some important cities such as Ceuta, Salé, and Sijilmassa overthrew their Almohad governors. An Almoravid, Yahya ibn al-Sahrawiyya, was declared ruler of Ceuta. After initial Almohad setbacks, the rebellion was eventually suppressed thanks to Abd al-Mu'min's lieutenant, Umar al-Hintati, who led a force that killed al-Massi. Abd al-Mu'min is said to have resorted to more draconian measures afterwards and initiated a purge of people he thought might be disloyal among the subject Berber tribes, allegedly resulting in around 30,000 executions.

The rebellion had taxed Almohad resources and resulted in temporary reversals in Al-Andalus too, but the Almohads soon went on the offensive again. Responding to local appeals from Muslim officials, they took control of Cordoba in 1149, saving the city from the forces of Alfonso VII. The remaining Almoravids in Al-Andalus, led by Yahya ibn Ghaniya, were by then confined to Granada. In 1150 or 1151 Abd al-Mu'min summoned the leaders and notables of Al-Andalus under his control to Ribat al-Fath (Rabat), where he made them pledge loyalty to him, apparently as a political demonstration of his power. The Almoravids in Granada were defeated in 1155 and retreated to the Balearic Islands, where they held out for several decades.

For much of the 1150s, however, Abd al-Mu'min concentrated his efforts on expanding eastwards across North Africa to Ifriqiya. By 1151, he had reached Constantine where he confronted a coalition of Arab tribes that had been marching through Berber lands. Rather than destroying these tribes, he utilised them for his campaigns in al-Andalus and they also helped to quell any internal opposition from the family of Ibn Tumart. Abd al-Mu'min led his forces to conquer Tunis in 1159, going on to progressively establish control over Ifriqiya by conquering the cities of Mahdia (then held by Roger II of Sicily), Kairouan, and other coastal cities as far as Tripoli (in modern-day Libya). He then returned to Marrakesh and left for an expedition to Al-Andalus in 1161. Abd al-Mu'min had ordered the construction of a new citadel at Gibraltar, where he based himself during his stay in Al-Andalus.

== Final years ==
The Almohad empire was built by Abd al-Mu'min and effectively ruled by his family (known as the Mu'minids). This plus his ongoing military activity angered those who considered themselves the founders of the Almohad movement. These founders made an unsuccessful attempt to assassinate Abd al-Mu'min in 1160.

Abd al-Mu'min returned from Al-Andalus to the Maghreb in 1162. Over the next year he stayed in Ribat al-Fath and began to gather troops within its walls with the intention of launching another expedition to Al-Andalus. However, he fell ill and, after long period of sickness, died there in May 1163 (Jumada II 558 AH). His body was transported to Tinmel, where he was buried, following a ceremony, next to Ibn Tumart in the religious complex (which was centred around the Great Mosque of Tinmel) he had built there years earlier. His son Abu Ya'qub Yusuf succeeded him.

== Legacy ==
Abd al-Mu'min established a central government that would control North Africa for more than a half century after he died. He founded a dynasty which his family, the Mu'minids, controlled. He added to the traditional clan organisations of the Berbers the concept of Makhzan, a central administration staffed by Spanish Muslims. To keep the Empire's revenue flowing, he created a land registry. Abd al-Mu'min also supported the arts, but in keeping with the founders' wishes, when mosques were built he kept them simple and plain compared to other structures of that time. He is considered as a national hero in Algeria.

He was also a prodigious builder of monuments and palaces. He notably founded the Kutubiyya Mosque in Marrakesh and the Mosque of Tinmel. In 1150 he built the Kasbah of the Udayas, across the river from Salé, and founded an adjacent settlement. Naming the new fortress al-Mahdiyya or Ribat al-Fath, he intended to use it as a staging point for future campaigns on the Iberian Peninsula. The settlement was further embellished and fortified by Yaq'ub al-Mansur at the end of the 12th century, and eventually became modern-day Rabat.

=== Family tree of Almohad dynasty ===
Almohad family tree

Ali al-Kumi
Abd al-Mu'min (1)
Muhammad	Abu Yaqub Yusuf I (2)	Abu al-Hassan Ali	Abu Zayd Abd al-Rahman	Abu Zakariya Abd al-Rahman	Abu Abd al-Rahman Yaqub	Abu Ibrahim Ismail	Abu Said Uthman	Abu Ali al-Hussein	Abu Muhammad Abd Allah	Abu Musa Isa	Abu Ishaq Ibrahim	Abu al-Rabi Sulayman	Abu Imran Musa	Abu Hafs Umar
Abu Yusuf Yaqub 'al-Mansur' (3)	Abu al-Ula Idris the Old	Abu Yahya	Abu Ishaq Ibrahim	Abu Hafs Umar 'al-Rashid'	Abu Zayd Muhammad	Abu Muhammad Abd al-Wahid I 'al-Makhlu' (6)	Abu Ibrahim Ishaq 'al-Tahir'	Abu Zayd Abd al-Rahman	Abu Zakariya Yahya	Abu al-Hassan Ali	Abu Yusuf Yaqub	Abu al-Rabi Sulayman	Abu Abd Allah Muhammad
Muhammad al-Nasir (4)	Abdallah al-Adil (7)	Abu Muhammad Said	Abu Musa	Ibrahim	Abu Said	Abu al-Ala Idris I 'al-Ma'mun' (9)	Abu Hafs Umar 'al-Murtada' (12)	Abu Zayd	Abu Ishaq	Abu Dabbus Idris II 'al-Wathiq' (13)	Abu Ali	Abd Allah 'al-Bayyansi'	Abu Zayd
Yahya 'al'Mutasim' (8)	Musa	Zakariya	Ali	Yusuf II 'al'Mustansir' (5)	Abu al-Hassan Ali 'al-Said' (11)	Abu Muhammad Abd al-Wahid II 'al-Rashid' (10)

== Sources ==
- Buresi, Pascal; El Aallaoui, Hicham (2012-11-15). Governing the Empire: Provincial Administration in the Almohad Caliphate (1224-1269): Critical Edition, Translation, and Study of Manuscript 4752 of the Ḥasaniyya Library in Rabat Containing 77 Taqādīm (“Appointments”). Translated by Bruce, Travis. Brill. ISBN 978-90-04-23971-5.

Preceded by Ishaq ibn Ali (end of Almoravid dynasty)	Almohad dynasty 1147–1163	Succeeded by Abu Ya'qub Yusuf
