= 1224 =

1224 in various calendars
- Gregorian calendar: 1224; MCCXXIV
- Ab urbe condita: 1977
- Armenian calendar: 673; ԹՎ ՈՀԳ
- Assyrian calendar: 5974
- Balinese saka calendar: 1145–1146
- Bengali calendar: 630–631
- Berber calendar: 2174
- English Regnal year: 8 Hen. 3 – 9 Hen. 3
- Buddhist calendar: 1768
- Burmese calendar: 586
- Byzantine calendar: 6732–6733
- Chinese calendar: 癸未年 (Water Goat); 3921 or 3714 — to — 甲申年 (Wood Monkey); 3922 or 3715
- Coptic calendar: 940–941
- Discordian calendar: 2390
- Ethiopian calendar: 1216–1217
- Hebrew calendar: 4984–4985
- Hindu calendars
- Vikram Samvat: 1280–1281
- Shaka Samvat: 1145–1146
- Kali Yuga: 4324–4325
- Holocene calendar: 11224
- Igbo calendar: 224–225
- Iranian calendar: 602–603
- Islamic calendar: 620–621
- Japanese calendar: Jōō 3 / Gennin 1 (元仁元年)
- Javanese calendar: 1132–1133
- Julian calendar: 1224; MCCXXIV
- Korean calendar: 3557
- Minguo calendar: 688 before ROC 民前688年
- Nanakshahi calendar: −244
- Thai solar calendar: 1766–1767
- Tibetan calendar: ཆུ་མོ་ལུག་ལོ་ (female Water-Sheep); 1350 or 969 or 197 — to — ཤིང་ཕོ་སྤྲེ་ལོ་ (male Wood-Monkey); 1351 or 970 or 198

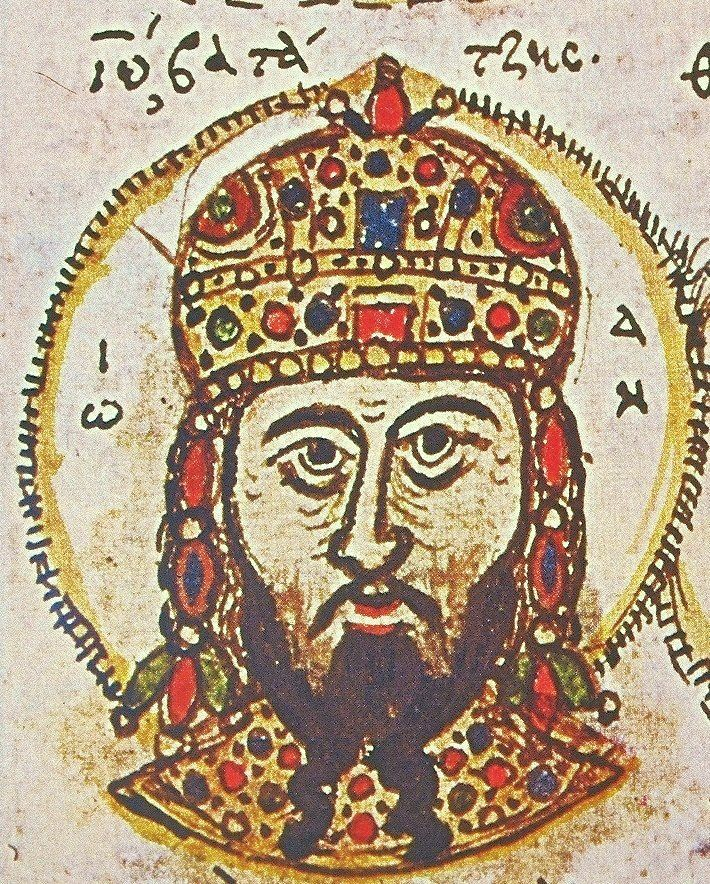
Emperor John III (Doukas Vatatzes)

Year 1224 (MCCXXIV) was a leap year starting on Monday of the Julian calendar.

== Events ==
=== January – March ===
- January 14 – Emperor Xuan Zong of the Chinese Jurchen-led Jin dynasty dies after a 10-year reign. He is succeeded by his 25-year-old son, Ai Zong, who conquers more Song territory during the Jin–Song Wars.
- February 20 – Jacopo Tiepolo (later: Doge of the Republic of Venice, 1229–1249), reaches an agreement in his capacity as Podestà, with Robert I, Emperor of Constantinople Latin Emperor, for favorable treatment for the Venetians in the Empire.
- February – King Ferdinand III (the Saint) announces his intention to resume the Reconquista against the realm of the Almohad Caliphate. Caliph Yusuf II al-Mustansir dies and is succeeded by Abu Muhammad al-Wahid, but in Al-Andalus, two competing pretenders also claim their rights to the throne: Abu Muhammad Ibn al-Mansur al-Adil in Seville and Abu Muhammad abu Abdallah al-Bayyasi in Córdoba. The chronic political instability on the Almohad site allows Ferdinand to begin his campaign victoriously in October, with the capture of Quesada in Spain.
- March 1 – Pope Honorius III sends a letter to the Roman Catholic Patriarch of Jerusalem, Francisco Clemente Pérez Capera, notifying him that the armies and navies of the Holy Roman Empire, the Teutonic Knights and the Kingdom of Sicily will be departing soon to begin the Sixth Crusade to recapture Jerusalem from the Arab rulers.

=== April – June ===
- April 23 – William Marshal, 2nd Earl of Pembroke, one of the enforcers of the Magna Carta, marries Eleanor of England, Countess of Leicester, the nine-year-old daughter of the late King John of England and sister of King Henry III, in order to strengthen the Marshal family's connection with the House of Plantagenet.
- May 5 – King Louis VIII (the Lion) declares war on King Henry III of England. He allies himself with Hugh X of Lusignan and invades first Poitou and then Northern Gascony. The English forces in Poitou are under-strength and lack support from the Poitevin nobles; as a result, the province quickly falls into French hands by the end of June.
- June 5 – The University of Naples is founded by Emperor Frederick II. Frederick's main purpose is to create an institution of higher learning that will put an end to the predominance of the universities of northern Italy, most notably these of Bologna and Padua, which are considered either too independent or under the strong influence of \Pope Honorius III.
- June 20 – The siege of Bedford Castle by King Henry III of England begins.

=== July – September ===
- July 16 – (28th day of 6th month of Gennin 1); Hōjō Yasutoki becomes the new regent (shikken) for the Kamakura shogunate in Japan after the death of his father, Hōjō Yoshitoki.
- August 15 – The garrison at Bedford Castle, belonging to Falkes de Bréauté, surrenders to Henry III after a two-month siege that ends after the castle has been undermined by a fire and fallen. After the garrison surrenders, the defenders are all hanged by order of the king. Falkes is allowed to leave the country but loses all his possessions. Bedford Castle is badly damaged as a result.
- September 14 – Francis of Assisi, while praying on the mountain of La Verna during a 40-day fast, has a vision, as a result of which he receives the stigmata. Brother Leo, who is with Francis at the time, leaves a clear and simple account of this event, the first definite account of the phenomenon of stigmata.
- September 17 – Emperor Ning Zong of the Chinese Song dynasty dies at Hangzhou, possibly from poisoning, after a 30-year reign. He is succeeded by his relative, Li Zong, as all of Ning Zong's children have died.
- September – Abdallah al-Adil (the Just), governor in Al-Andalus, challenges the Almohad throne and captures Seville. He marches to Marrakesh to confront Abu Muhammad al-Wahid. Abdallah seizes the royal palace and deposes Muhammad al-Wahid, who is strangled to death.

=== October – December ===
- October – Lý Huệ Tông, Emperor of Vietnam, cedes the throne to his second daughter, the Princess Chiêu Thánh, who becomes the Empress Regnant Lý Chiêu Hoàng. Trần Thủ Độ then arranges a marriage between the Empress and Trần Cảnh, the 8-year-old son of Trần Thừa, and ends the rule of the Lý dynasty by making the Empress pass the throne to Trần Cảnh the following year.
- November 24 – Representatives of King Louis VIII of France and Frederick II, Holy Roman Emperor, sign a treaty at Catania, providing that neither of the monarchs would harbor rebels from the other.
- December – Theodore Komnenos (Doukas), ruler of the Despotate of Epirus, captures Thessaloniki – beginning the de facto Byzantine Empire of Thessalonica. Later, Theodore Komnenos was crowned Byzantine emperor but is not recognized as such by the rest of the Greek or Latin population.

=== By place ===
==== Byzantine Empire ====
- Spring – Battle of Poimanenon: Byzantine forces under Emperor John III (Doukas Vatatzes', ruler of Nicaea, defeat the Latin army under the brothers Alexios Laskaris and Isaac Laskaris. They begin a revolt and decide to aid the request of Emperor Robert I of Courtenay. The two armies meet at Poimanenon, south of Cyzicus in Mysia, near Lake Kuş ("Bird Lake"). In the ensuing battle, John III achieves a decisive victory; among the captives taken are the two Laskaris brothers, who are blinded. The victory opens the way for the recovery by the Byzantines of most of the Latin possessions in Asia Minor.

==== Europe ====
- Livonian Crusade: The Livonian Brothers of the Sword defeat the Estonians and reconquer the captured strongholds on the Estonian mainland. With the surrender of the Tartu stronghold, only the islands of Saaremaa and Muhu remain under Estonian control.
- Spring – Falkes de Bréauté, English high sheriff and a rival of Henry III, refuses to relinquish his castles and starts a rebellion. Cardinal Stephen Langton and forces under Hubert de Burgh, Earl of Kent deal with Falkes and the castles are handed over. Falkes is found guilty of 16 counts of wrongful disseisin; he and his brother William are excommunicated by Langton.

==== Asia ====
- Spring – The Mongol army led by Subutai and Jochi cross the steppes of modern Kazakhstan, and returns to the horde of Genghis Khan on the Irtysh River. At a great kurultai or gathering of chiefs, Subutai reports on the Western campaign. Jochi submits to Genghis and his supposed 'insubordination' (see 1220) is forgiven. As a result of the Mongol invasion in 1219–1223, Kazakhstan and Central Asia become part of the Mongol Empire.

== Births ==
- March 5 – Kinga of Poland, high duchess of Poland (d. 1292)
- March 20 – Sophie of Thuringia, duchess of Brabant (d. 1275)
- June 14 – Matilda of Brabant, countess of Artois (d. 1288)
- Alice de Lusignan, countess of Surrey (d. 1256)
- Elena of Bulgaria, empress of Nicaea (d. 1258)
- Herman I, German nobleman and knight (d. 1290)
- Hōjō Tsunetoki, Japanese regent (shikken; d. 1246)
- Isabelle of France, French princess and nun (d. 1270)
- Jean de Joinville, French historian and writer (d. 1317)
- Kanezawa Sanetoki, Japanese nobleman (d. 1276)
- Margery de Burgh, Norman noblewoman (d. 1252)
- Maud de Braose, English noblewoman (d. 1301)
- Pribislaw I, German nobleman and knight (d. 1275)
- Teruko, Japanese princess and empress (d. 1262)
- Theobald Butler, Norman chief governor (d. 1248)
- William II, French nobleman and knight (d. 1251)

== Deaths ==
- January 14 – Xuan Zong, Chinese emperor (b. 1163)
- March 24 – Conrad III, German cleric and bishop (b. 1165)
- March 27 – William of Sainte-Mère-Église, Norman bishop
- April 14 – Matilda of Dendermonde, Flemish noblewoman
- April 30 – Bernard II, German nobleman and knight (b. 1140)
- July 1 – Hōjō Yoshitoki, Japanese regent (shikken; b. 1163)
- July 24 – Christina the Astonishing, Flemish saint (b. 1150)
- August 15 – Marie of France, duchess of Brabant (b. 1198)
- September 17 – Ning Zong, Chinese emperor (b. 1168)
- Abu Muhammad al-Wahid, ruler of the Almohad Caliphate
- Cathal Crobdearg Ua Conchobair, king of Connacht (b. 1153)
- Durand of Huesca, Spanish monk and theologian (b. 1160)
- Judah ben Isaac Messer, French Jewish rabbi (b. 1166)
- Liu Songnian, Chinese landscape painter (b. 1174)
- Máel Muire Ó Connaig, Irish bishop of Kilmacduagh
- Raoul of Mérencourt, Latin patriarch of Jerusalem
- Simon Rochfort (or de Rupeforti), English bishop
- Thomas I, Hungarian chancellor and archbishop
- William d'Aubigny, English nobleman and knight
- William de Mowbray, English nobleman and knight
- Xia Gui, Chinese landscape painter
- Yusuf II al-Mustansir, ruler of the Almohad Caliphate
