= Almohad dinar =

The Almohad dinar is the gold coin minted in the Muslim West under Almohad rule.

== Description ==
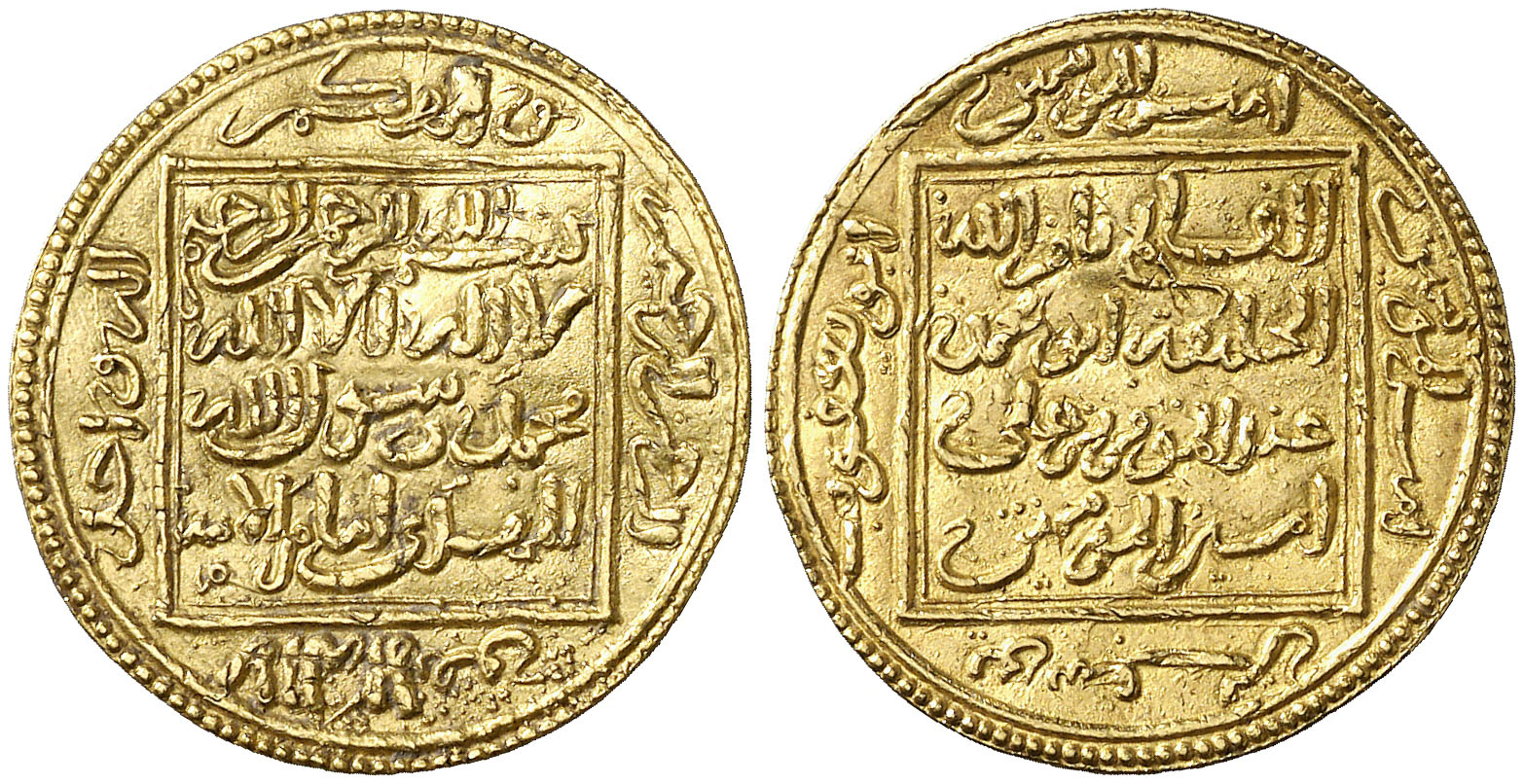
Almohad dinar, minted in Marrakesh by Caliph Abu Yaqub Yusuf (in the 12th century).

The Almohad dinar has several original features. It includes a square motif on the obverse, an original legend, and a weight reformed from the standard of the Muslim world: the mithqal, inherited from the Umayyad and Abbasid caliphs. Indeed, Abd al-Mumin fixed the weight at 2.3 g instead of the 4.72 g then in force according to the Abbasid standard. This Almohad dinar, and later the one minted under his son Yusuf (the Yusuf dinar), therefore probably had an Eastern influence; the weight was simply halved. This policy of monetary reform was continued by Abd al-Mumin's successors.

The Almohad dinar was divided into a sub-multiple, the masmodina (literally "Masmuda coin"), weighing 2.3 g. The masmoudina, also called the small Almohad dinar, was the dinar most frequently minted by the Almohads. It was also the most important fractional coin.

The majority of Almohad dinar mints were located in Morocco and Al-Andalus. Indeed, according to Khaled Ben Romdhane's counts, out of a total of 262 Almohad dinars collected bearing an indication of minting location, only 26 are from Bougie, and 7 from Tunis, the majority of the dinars originating from Morocco or al-Andalus.
