= Yahya al-Mu'tasim =

Almohad rival caliph (died 1236)

Yahya al-Mu`tasim
- Almohad Caliph

Ruler of the Almohad Caliphate
- Reign: 1227–1229
- Predecessor: Abdallah al-Adil
- Successor: Idris al-Ma'mun
- Born: unknown date
- Died: 1236
Names
- Abū Zakarīyā' Al-Mu`taṣim Yaḥyā ibn An-Nāṣir
- Father: Muhammad al-Nasir
- Religion: Islam

Yahya al-Mu`tasim (Arabic: أبو زكرياء المعتصم يحي بن الناصر; Abū Zakarīyā' Al-Mu`taṣim Yaḥyā ibn An-Nāṣir; died 1236) was an Almohad rival caliph who reigned from 1227 to 1229. He was a son of Muhammad al-Nasir and brother of Yusuf II, Almohad caliph.

== Life ==
At the death of his uncle Abdallah al-Adil, Yahya was supported by the sheikhs of Marrakesh, but two years later he was turned down by another pretender, his other uncle Idris al-Ma'mun. At the latter's death in 1232, Yahya renewed his pretenses, but his cousin Abd al-Wahid II was preferred to him. He was anyway able to keep Marrakesh until his death in 1236, after which the Almohad territories were again united under Abd al-Wahid.

== Sources ==
- Charles-André Julien. Histoire de l‘Afrique du Nord, des origines à 1830.

== Notes ==
Preceded by Abdallah al-Adil	Almohad dynasty 1227–1229	Succeeded by Idris al-Ma'mun
