= Military campaigns against Mahdia =

There have been several military campaigns against the Tunisian city of Mahdia, including:

- Mahdia campaign of 1087, in which Genoese and Pisan forces sacked the city
- Capture of Mahdia (1148), the city was sacked during the creation of the Norman kingdom of Africa
- Battle of Mahdia (1159), part of Almohad conquest of Norman Africa
- Siege of Mahdia (1159–1160), part of Almohad conquest of Norman Africa
- Barbary Crusade (1390), in which French and Genoese crusaders unsuccessfully besieged the city
- Capture of Mahdia (1550), in which Spanish forces besieged and captured the city
