= Al-Adil (disambiguation) =

Al-Adil I (1145–1218), also known as Safadin (Sayf-ad-Din), was the Ayyubid sultan of Egypt and brother of Saladin.

Al-Adil (the Just) is a laqab (an Arabic cognomen or epithet). It may also refer to:

- Al-Adil II (c. 1221–1248), Ayyubid sultan of Egypt, great-nephew of Saladin
- Abdallah al-Adil (died 1227), Almohad caliph of Morocco
- Al-Adil Kitbugha (died 1303), Mamluk sultan of Egypt
- Saif al-Adel (born 1960 or 1963), Egyptian former special forces officer and explosives expert, purported de facto leader of al-Qaeda
