= Banu al-Rand =

Sunni Muslim Berber dynasty

Banu al-Rand بنو الرند
- 1053–1159
- Status: Nominal vassal of the Abbasid Caliphate
- Capital: Gafsa
- Other languages: Berber languages Arabic
- Religion: Sunni Islam
- Government: Monarchy
- Emir
  - 1053-1072: Abdullah ibn al-Rand
  - 1072-1159: Abu Umar al-Mu'tazz
  - 1168: Ali ibn al-Aziz
- History
  - Established: 1053
  - Disestablished: 1159
Preceded by	Succeeded by
Zirid Dynasty	Almohad Caliphate
- Today part of: Tunisia

Banu al-Rand, was a Sunni Muslim Berber dynasty, centered on Gafsa, in present-day Tunisia, between approximately 1053 and 1159. It was established by Abdullah ibn al-Rand.

== History ==
Banu al-Rand dynasty was found by Abdullah ibn Muhammed ibn al-Rand, Historians differed on his origin, Ibn Khaldun claims that he was from Djerba, from the Banu Sedghiyan who lived in al-Jussayn in Nefzawa, Ibn Nukhayl said that their origin was from the Banu Marin (or Banu Azmerten) of Maghrawa. Abdullah was the governor of Gafsa during the reign of al-Mu'izz ibn Badis, when Banu Hilal invaded Ifriqiya, Abdullah succeeded in protecting Gafsa, consolidating security in it, removing corrupt individuals, and ensuring the comfort of the residents and the safety of travelers by paying tribute to the Hilalian Bedouins, Then he decided to take independence with the city in 1053, and Tozeur, El Hamma, Nefzaoua, Nefta, Taqius and all the lands of Djerid pledged allegiance to him. During his reign, the Battle of Taqius took place between the Arabs and the people of Taquis, ending in a victory for the inhabitants. Ibn al-Rand brought a political and economic renaissance in his state. He was also pious and relegious, so poets, writers, and clerics flocked to him.

Abdullah died in 1072, and his son Abu Umar al-Mu'tazz succeeded him, his reign was successful, the people of Gafsa obeyed him, and he spread security and collected taxes, and succeeded in annexing Qamuda, Jabal Hawara and the Djerid region to the state, but he became blind and his son Tamim died, so he handed over the crown princeship to his grandson Yahya bin Tamim, who also took over the rule (de facto) from his blind grandfather, Al-Zarkashi said about him: "Yahya was a famous hero, his son too, and they are from Maghrawa the peoples of Nefzawa".

When Almohads led by Abd al-Mu'min ibn Ali, came to invade Ifriqiya, Yahya ibn Tamim led a delegation to negotiate the surrender of Gafsa, when they arrived, the Hajib (chamberlain) informed Abd al-Mu'min, who said, "You are mistaken; these are not the people of Gafsa." The chamberlain replied, "I am not mistaken." Abd al-Mu'min said, "How can that be, when the Mahdi says that our people [Almohads] are cutting down its [Gafsa] trees and demolishing its walls? Yet we accept this and refrain from attacking them, so that God's will may be done.", then he sent the delegation back to Gafsa with a group of Almohads and the new governor of Gafsa, Zikri ibn Barmoun or Nu'man ibn 'Abd al-Haqq al-Hintati. When the people of Gafsa entered the Caliph's presence, their poet, Abu Muhammad Abdullah ibn Abi al-Abbas al-Tifashi, recited: "None has ever stirred the swords and spears, like Caliph Abd al-Mu'min ibn Ali.", upon hearing this opening verse, the Caliph signaled him to stop there and rewarded him with a thousand dinars.

Then Banu al-Rand were moved to Bejaia, were al-Mu'tazz ibn Abdullah died in 1162 at the age of 114, his grandson Yahya ibn Tamim died shortly after him. Another account tells that after the delegation arrived, Abd al-Mu’min honored the Banu al-Rand and ordered them to move to Bejaia, where they stayed until the death of Abu Umar al-Mu’tazz, then they returned to live in Gafsa.

=== Gafsa Revolt (1168) ===
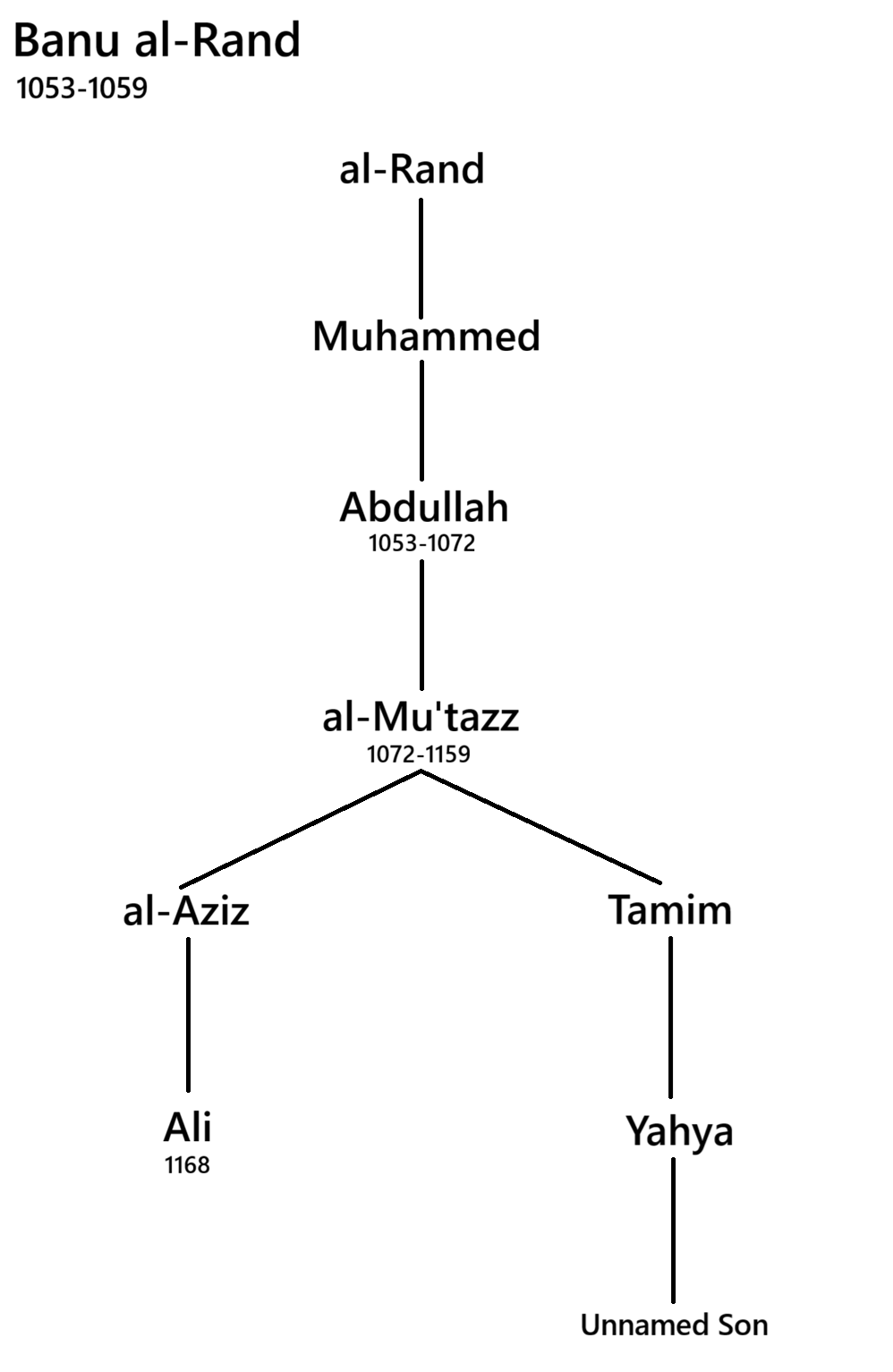
Banu al-Rand lineage map

Nu'man ibn 'Abd al-Haqq al-Hintati was appointed governor of Gafsa. After three years, he was dismissed and replaced by Maymun ibn Ajana al-Kansifi. Maymun was then dismissed and replaced by 'Imran ibn Musa al-Sanhaji, who mistreated the people, so they then contacted Ali ibn al-Aziz ibn al-Mu'tazz, also known as an Ali al-Tawil, a poor tailor residing in Bejaia, and asked him to come and take control of the city. They revolted against Imran, killed him, and surrendered the city to Ali and the poor tailor became the ruler of Gafsa, Ali ruled the city well, governing the emirate and protecting the people. However, the time for the Almohad response had come. Abu Yaqub Yusuf sent his brother, Abu Zakariya, who besieged Gafsa in 1168 until he was victorious, he captured Ali ibn al-Aziz and sent him to Marrakesh with his family and possessions. Ali then ruled Salé until his death, and with his death, the Banu al-Rand dynasty came to an end.

Other accounts relate this temporar restoration to Qaraqush expedition, as a spillover, and mention that Ali ibn al-Aziz pledged allegiance to the Abbasids (which his ancesotors have been accustomed to since their early days) and named himself "Al-Nasir li din al-Nabi", and when Abu Yaqub marched to Ifriqiya to face Qaraqush, he went to Gafsa first and sieged it by himself until it fell in 1181.

== List of Rulers ==
- Abdullah ibn al-Rand (1053–1072)
- Abu Umar al-Mu'tazz (1072–1159)
- Almohad Governors (1159-1168)
- Ali ibn al-Aziz (1168)
