= Banu Khazrun =

Former ruling dynasty in Tripoli, Libya

- 1001–1146
- Capital: Tripoli
- Common languages: Arabic, Berber
- Religion: Islam
- History
  - Established: 1001
  - Disestablished: 1146
| Preceded by | Succeeded by |
| Zirid dynasty | Kingdom of Africa |
- Today part of: Libya

The Banu Khazrun were a family of the Maghrawa that ruled Tripoli from 1001 to 1146.

== History ==
During the 10th century, the region of Ifriqiya and Tripolitania came under the control of the Fatimid Caliphate. After the Fatimids moved their capital to Cairo in the 970s, they left their territories in the Maghreb under the control of their vassals, the Zirid dynasty. After 1001, Tripolitania broke away from Zirid control under the leadership of Fulful ibn Sa'id ibn Khazrun, a leader of the Banū Khazrūn tribe, from the Maghrawa Berber confederation. This established the Banu Khazrun dynasty that lasted up to the mid-12th century.

Fulful fought a protracted war against Badis ibn al-Mansur, the Zirid emir, and sought outside help from the Fatimid caliphs themselves in Cairo and even from the Andalusi Umayyads in Córdoba. After his death in 1009, the Zirids were able to retake Tripoli for a time. The region nonetheless remained effectively under control of the Banu Khazrun, who fluctuated between practical autonomy and full independence, often playing the Fatimids and the Zirids against each other.

After the death of Fulful ibn Sai'd ibn Khazrun in 1009–10, his brother Warru was proclaimed as leader. He warred against the Zirids but was forced to recognize their authority several times. After his death in 1014–5, the Maghrawa tribes were divided in a succession dispute between Warru's brother, Khazrun ibn Sa'id, and Warru's son, Khalifa. Khalifa prevailed and Khazrun left for Egypt along with his two sons, Sa'id and al-Muntasir. Khalifa initially recognized the Zirid ruler, Badis, but refused to recognize the authority of his successor, al-Mu'izz ibn Badis (r. 1016–1062). He launched attacks in the regions around Gabès and Tripoli. The Zirids finally ceded Tripoli to the Banu Khazrun in 1022. In 1026–7, Khalifa obtained from the Fatimid caliph in Cairo, al-Zahir, a formal confirmation of his position as governor of Tripoli, while agreeing to send gifts to al-Mu'izz ibn Badis.

Khalifa died at some point during the reign of the Fatimid caliph al-Zahir (r. 1021–1036). Within his lifetime, the sons of Khazrun ibn Sa'id returned to contest control of Tripolitania. Eventually, al-Muntasir emerged victorious as the ruler of Tripoli and the Maghrawa in the region, a position which he kept for a long period. Between 1038 and 1049, he waged a long war against the Zirids, defeating two of their expeditions against him. He was defeated by a third Zirid expedition and agreed to a peace treaty. During the invasions of the Banu Hilal in 1051–1052, he accepted the authority of al-Mu'izz ibn Badis and came to his aid. The Zirids and their allies were nonetheless defeated and forced to retreat, leaving the Banu Hilal to occupy the inland plains across the region, although Al-Muntasir still retained control of Tripoli.

Sometime around 1075, al-Muntasir led the Banu Adi, an Arab tribe, on an expedition against the Hammadid kingdom to the west (in present-day Algeria). He occupied the towns of Ashir and al-Masila, along with the M'zab and Righ regions, while retaining control of Tripoli. He made a new base for himself in Waghlana (modern-day Ourlal), near Biskra. The Hammadid governor of Biskra later succeeded in having him killed.

Little is known about the history of the Banu Khazrun after al-Muntasir. In 1143, Roger II of Sicily tried and failed to take Tripoli from Muhammad ibn Khazrun. By 1146, a famine drove the city's inhabitants to expel the Banu Khazrun. This afforded Roger the opportunity to finally capture the city in 1146 or 1147. The dynasty's rule came to an end at this time and the Normans extended their influence to the coastal cities in this region.

== List of Khazrunid rulers ==
The following list includes the Khazrunid rulers of Tripoli:

- Fulful ibn Sa'id ibn Khazrun (1000/1001–1009/1010)
- Warru ibn Sa'id (1009/1010–1014/1015)
- Khalifa ibn Warru (c. 1015–?)
- Sa'id ibn Khazrun (?–1037/1038)
- Khazrun ibn Khalifa (1037/1038–1038)
- Al-Muntasir ibn Khazrun (1038–1049)

Other rulers after al-Muntasir are not known by name. The last Khazrunid ruler was expelled by the Normans circa 1146.
