= Almohad conquest of Norman Africa =

12th c. military conflict in Africa

Almohad conquest of Ifriqiya
Date	1159–1160
Location	Ifriqiya
Result	Almohad victory: End of the Norman presence in the eastern Maghreb
Territorial changes	Establishment of the Almohad province of Ifriqiya

Belligerents
Almohad Caliphate	Kingdom of Sicily; Kingdom of Africa; Khurasanid Emirate

Commanders and leaders
Abd al-Mumin; Abū ʿAbdallāh	William I

The Almohad conquest of Norman Africa was the invasion of Norman Africa by the Almohads, which put an end to the presence of the Normans in the region.

== Background ==
By the time the 12th century arrived, the Zirid dynasty's control over Ifriqiya had noticeably weakened. This allowed the Normans of Sicily to expand their territory under the leadership of King Roger II. Following the conquest of numerous coastal cities in Ifriqiya, King Roger II declared himself the King of Africa or "Ifriqiya". By 1148, the Normans had managed to take control of most of key Ifriqiyan cities, including Tripoli, Gabis, Sfax, and even the Zirid capital of Mahdiyya, this marked the end of the Zirid dynasty's control in the region. The Normans' growing Christian presence in Ifriqiya posed a significant threat to the Almohads, who were a newly formed caliphate in the western Maghreb, in the same time Abd al-Mu'min saw it as an opportunity to expand the Almohad rule in the east. The Almohad army, originally intended for a campaign in Spain, redirected its focus towards the east. The central Maghrib cities of Algiers and Bijaya had already fallen to Almohad rule, marking the end of Hammadid rule in the region. However, instead of continuing on to Norman-controlled territories in Ifriqiya, Abd al-mu'min returned to western Maghreb.

Starting in 1156, Ifriqiyan cities such as Tripoli, Sfax, Jirba, and Gabes revolted against the Normans, resulting in their expulsion from these cities. Soon after, Abd al-mu'min received delegations from Ifriqiyan Muslims seeking assistance against the Normans.

== Invasion ==
In 1159, a massive Almohad army, estimated to be the size of 100,000 men by Ibn Athir, departed from Salé and headed eastwards, led by Abd al-Mu'min who was accompanied by Abu'l-Hasan the last Zirid sultan. Abū ʿAbdallāh b. Maymūn led a fleet of seventy galleys sailing along the coast in alignment with the Almohad army. The army captured Tunis after a three-day siege, expelling the Banu Khurasan and installing an Almohad governor in the city. Next, they moved on to Mahdia, which was under siege for at least three months. The Almohad navy also achieved a victory against the Sicilian fleet, which had attempted to break the siege. Eventually, the siege was lifted with an Almohad victory.
