= Idris al-Ma'mun =

Almohad Caliph from 1229 to 1232

Abu al-Ala Idris al-Ma'mun
- Almohad Caliph

Ruler of the Almohad Caliphate
- Reign: 1229–1232
- Predecessor: Yahya al-Mu'tasim
- Successor: Abd al-Wahid II
- Born: unknown date
- Died: 16/17 October 1232
- Issue: Abd al-Wahid II; Abu al-Hasan as-Said al-Mutadid
- Father: Abu Yusuf Yaqub al-Mansur
- Mother: Safiya bint Abu Abdallah ben Merdnych
- Religion: Islam

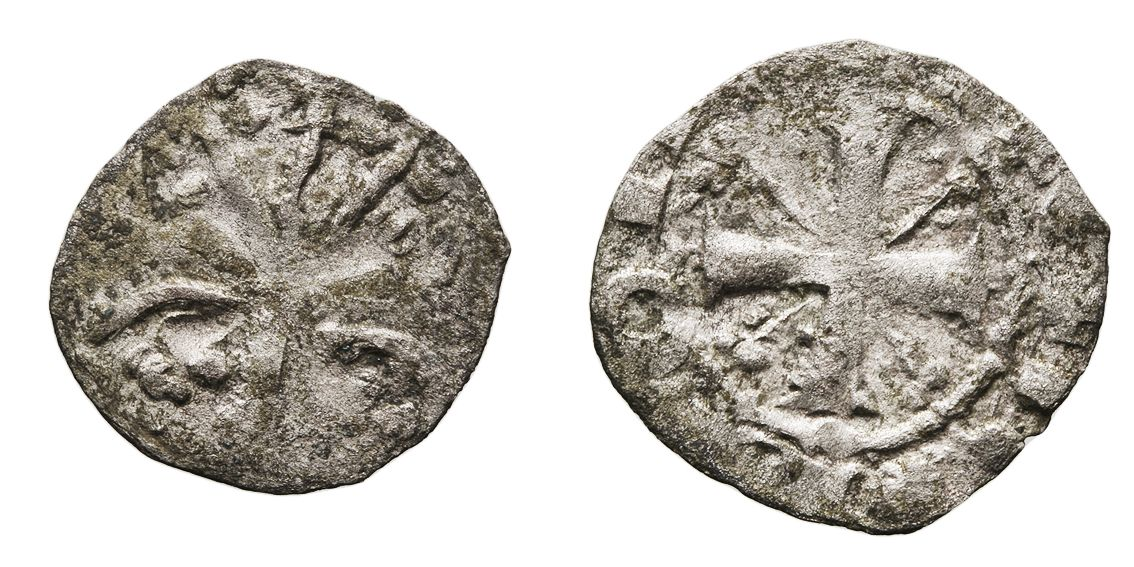
Coins of Ferdinand III of Castile, who helped Idris al-Ma'mun

Abu al-Ala Idris al-Ma'mun (Arabic: أبو العلا المأمون إدريس بن المنصور; Abū Al-`lā Al-Mā'mūn Idrīs ibn Al-Manṣūr; died 16 or 17 October 1232) was an Almohad rival caliph who reigned in part of the empire from 1229 until his death. He was a son of Abu Yusuf Yaqub al-Mansur and brother of Muhammad al-Nasir and Abdallah al-Adil.

== Life ==
Al-Ma'mun was the first Almohad ruler to officially renegade on the Imamate of the Mahdi Ibn Tumart, recognizing instead the Abbasid caliph in Baghdad as Imam and reverted back to promoting the Taqlid of the Maliki madhab formerly promoted by the Almoravids whom the Almohads had ousted less than a century earlier. He claimed instead that the title Mahdi applied to Jesus. His nephew Yahya took this step as license to proclaim himself caliph and a civil war broke out. At the same time, a revolt took place in Murcia under emir al-Mutawakkil. Al-Ma'mun therefore send his relative Abu Zayd from Valencia to Murcia to squash the revolt, but Abu Zayd was defeated. Al-Ma'mun then went with an army to confront al-Mutawakkil, but he could not capture the city itself. As the situation in North Africa also became worse, al-Ma'mun departed to Morocco and ended thus Almohad rule on the peninsula.

Idris asked Ferdinand III of Castile for help, receiving 12,000 knights (Note: Ibn 'Idhari states the number was likely 500 knights) who allowed him to conquer that city and to massacre the sheikhs that had supported Yahya. Following his victory, Idris honored the treaty with Ferdinand III and allowed the construction of a Christian church in Marrakesh in 1230, which was destroyed two years later by Yahya. The side changes of Idris soon lost him popular consent. In the early 1232, when he was besieging Ceuta, Yahya took the occasion to capture Marrakesh. Idris died during the march to reach the city, and was succeeded by his son Abd al-Wahid II.

In 1229 Abu Zakariya Yahya of the Hafsid dynasty in Ifriqiya rebelled once more against caliphate's authority after he heard that the Almohad caliph in Marrakesh Idris al-Ma'mun, had overthrown and killed two of his brothers and that he had cancelled the creed of Ibn Tumart. Additionally, Idris al-Ma'mun instructed the Imams to insult Ibn Tumart in the mosques and cancelled the call to prayer in Berber.

One of his consort was a Christian woman, Habbaba, who upon his death informed the Christian palace militia before she informed the Muslim members of the court, giving the former an advantage.

Idris’ other son was Abu al-Hasan as-Said al-Mutadid.

== Sources ==
- Lower, Michael (2014). "The Papacy and Christian Mercenaries of Thirteenth-Century North Africa". Speculum. 89 (3 JULY). The University of Chicago Press: 601–631. doi:10.1017/S0038713414000761. S2CID 154773840.
- Minnema, Anthony H. (15 May 2024). The Last Ta'ifa: The Banu Hud and the Struggle for Political Legitimacy in Al-Andalus. Cornell University Press. ISBN 978-1-5017-7490-4.

Preceded by Yahya, Almohad Caliph	Almohad dynasty 1229–1232	Succeeded by Abd al-Wahid II
