= Zaynab bent Youssef =

Almohad princess

Zaynab bent Youssef Ibn ‘Abd al-Moumen (Arabic: زينب بنت يوسف بن عبد المومن; c. late 12th century – c. early 13th century ?) was an Almohad princess who took part at conferences on the sources of the law, she went down in history as a learned woman. She was the daughter of Almohad caliph Abu Yaqub Yusuf.

== Life ==
Zaynab was born in Andalusia. She received a sophisticated education, studying philosophy, al-kalam (theology) and usul al-fiqh (Islamic law). She became a learned woman whose sound opinions were recognized. She was then engaged to her cousin, Abou Zayd Abd Ar-Rahmane, who lived in Tunis.

However, on her way there, the boat of Princess Zaynab was attacked by Sicilian pirates. She was taken as a captive to the palace of William II of Sicily, known by the nickname of William the Good. When he discovered Zaynab's identity, he ordered that she be treated with respect and brought with dignity to her father's palace. However, for some twenty years, relations between Sicily and the Almohads had been tense, because of the military operations that the Almohads had carried out to free the port of Kairaouane from Sicilian occupation. Touched by such treatment, the Almohad caliph Abu Yaqub Yusuf sent a diplomatic mission to thank William II for his kindness. Without delay, in August 1181, Morocco and Sicily signed a peace and trade agreement.
