= Norman expedition to Tripoli (1143) =

Norman Expedition to Tripoli
- Part of Norman conquest of North Africa
Date	1143
Location	Tripoli, Libya
Result	Khazrunid victory

Belligerents
Khazrunid Dynasty	Kingdom of Sicily

Commanders and leaders
Muhammad ibn Khazrun	Roger II

Strength
Unknown	Unknown

Casualties and losses
Unknown	Unknown

The Norman Expedition to Tripoli was one of the many conflicts between the Kingdom of Sicily and the Zirids allied with the Banu Khazrun, where the Normans attempted to expand their influence in North Africa.

== Expedition ==
Roger II initiated an expedition in 1143 with the objective of capturing Tripoli, an additional port under the dominion of Banu Khazrun which controlled a part of Ifriqiya. The expedition was unsuccessful because the neighboring Banu Khazrun tribes staunchly defended the city.

== Aftermath ==
After the failure of the 1143 expedition, Norman fleets instead conducted raids along the Maghreb coast, extending as far as contemporary western Algeria, through 1144 and 1145. A famine by 1146 forced the people of the city to drive out the Banu Khazrun. Roger was able to take the city in 1146 or 1147 at last because of this. Around this time, the dynasty's rule came to an end, and the Normans began to exert influence over the coastal cities in this area.
