= Abd al-Wahid I =

Almohad Caliph in 1224

Abd al-Wahid ibn Yusuf
- Almohad Caliph

Ruler of the Almohad Caliphate
- Reign: February–September 1224
- Predecessor: Yusuf II
- Successor: Abdallah al-Adil
- Died: September 1224
- Dynasty: Almohad
- Father: Abu Yaqub Yusuf
- Religion: Islam

Abu Muhammad Abd al-Wahid 'al-Makhlu' (also known as Abd al-Wahid I, Arabic: أبو محمد عبد الواحد بن يوسف Abū Muḥammad ʿAbd al-Wāḥid ibn Yūsuf) was the Almohad Caliph for less than a year in 1224.

== Life ==
Abd al-Wahid was the son of the great Almohad conqueror Abu Yaqub Yusuf and younger brother of the late Caliph Yaqub al-Mansur (d.1199). He had served with distinction on campaign in al-Andalus, was appointed governor of Málaga in 1202, and sheikh of the Masmuda tribe of the Haskura in 1206. He served for some time after that as governor in Sijilmassa, and around 1221, was briefly governor in Seville.

Abd al-Wahid was back in Marrakesh in February 1224, when his grand-nephew, the young Almohad caliph Yusuf II, was accidentally killed, leaving no heirs. The palace vizier Abu Sa`id Uthman ibn Jami'i quickly drafted the elderly Abd al-Wahid, then in his sixties, and presented him before the Almohad sheikhs of Marrakesh, who promptly elected him as the new Almohad Caliph. However, the hastiness of the election and the probable unconstitutionality of these proceedings, was disputed by his other nephews, the brothers of al-Nasir, who governed in al-Andalus. Like other leading Almohad family nobles, the brothers had probably hoped for a less-experienced and more pliable candidate, likelier to give them freer rein to carry on autonomously in the provinces, as they had enjoyed during the caliphate of Yusuf II. The succession stunt unbalanced the careful coalition that had been built up over decades, setting different branches of the Almohad family member against each other, and against the palace bureaucrats and the tribal sheikhs.

It was the first serious succession dispute in the Almohad Caliphate. Despite disagreements, the Almohad coalition had hitherto loyally lined up behind the new caliph. Not this time. Instigated by the shadowy figure of Abu Zayd ibn Yujjan, a former high bureaucrat who had been disgraced and exiled by ibn Jami'i, the brothers decided to elect their own Caliph Abdallah al-Adil in Seville, and set about ferrying troops from Spain to challenge Abd al-Wahid I in Morocco.

Abd al-Wahid I did not last long as Caliph. Ibn Yujjan used his contacts in southern Morocco, notably Abu Zakariya, the sheikh of the Hintata tribe, and Yusuf ibn Ali, governor of Tinmal, who seized the Marrakech palace and removed Ibn Jami'i and his supporters (Ibn Jami'i was eventually killed, while in exile in the Atlas Mountains). The caliph, Abd al-Wahid I, was murdered by strangulation in September 1224. The nickname by which he is frequently referred to in the chronicles, "al-Makhlu", means "the Deposed".

| Preceded by Yusuf II | Almohad dynasty 1224–1224 | Succeeded by Abdallah al-Adil |
