= Siege of Mahdia (1159–1160) =

- Part of Almohad conquest of Norman Africa
Date	1159–1160
Location	Mahdia, Tunisia
Result	Almohad victory

Belligerents
Almohad Caliphate	Normans

Commanders and leaders
Abd al-Mu'min	William I of Sicily

Strength
100,000	Unknown

Casualties and losses
Unknown	Unknown

The siege of Mahdia was a seven month siege led by the Almohad Caliph Abd al-Mu’min against the Norman forces of King William I of Sicily.

== History ==
The people of Ifriqiya sought help from Abd al-Mu’min against Norman occupation. Abd al-Mu’min led a large army into Tunisia and took Tripoli, Sfax and other cities from the Normans. Abd al-Mu’min besieged Mahdia for seven months, eventually the Almohad navy defeated the Normans and Abd al-Mu’min negotiated with them which resulted in the Normans surrendering Mahdia thus ending Norman rule in Africa.
