= Abu al-Hasan as-Said al-Mutadid =

Almohad Caliph from 1242 to 1248

- Almohad Caliph

Ruler of the Almohad Caliphate
- Reign: 1242–1248
- Predecessor: Abd al-Wahid II
- Successor: Abu Hafs Umar al-Murtada
- Died: June 1248; Oujda
- Father: Idris al-Ma'mun
- Religion: Islam

Abu al-Hasan as-Said al-Mutadid (Arabic: أبو الحسن المعتضد بالله السعيد بن المأمون; abū al-ḥasan al-mu`taḍid bi-llah as-sa`īd ben al-mā'mūn; died 1248) was an Almohad caliph who reigned from 1242 until his death. He was a son of Idris al-Ma'mun.

== Life ==
He succeeded his brother Abd al-Wahid II in a period in which the Almohads controlled only parts of present-day Morocco. During his reign, he tried to recover Meknes from the Marinids and Tlemcen from the Zayyanids. As-Said was able to obtain a contingent from the Marinids who made a nominal submission to him, but was killed by the Zayyanids in the Battle of Oujda after which his head was taken and ordered to be shown to his mother.

The Marinids then took the opportunity to conquer Fes, reducing the Almohads’ effective control to the Marrakesh area.

== Sources ==
- Julien, Charles-André. Histoire de l'Afrique du Nord, des origines à 1830, Payot, Paris, 1994.

Preceded by Abd al-Wahid II	Almohad dynasty 1242–1248	Succeeded by Umar
