= Abd al-Wahid II =

Almohad rival caliph (died 1242)

- Almohad Caliph

Ruler of the Almohad Caliphate
- Reign: 1232–1242
- Predecessor: Idris al-Ma'mun
- Successor: Abu al-Hasan as-Said al-Mutadid
- Died: 4 December 1242
- Father: Idris al-Ma'mun
- Religion: Islam

Abu Muhammad ar-Rashid Abd al-Wahid (Arabic: أبو محمد الرشيد عبد الواحد بن المأمون; Abū Muḥammad Ar-Rashīd `Abd al-Wāḥid ibn Al-Mā'mūn; died 4 December 1242) was an Almohad caliph who reigned from 1232 until his death.

== Life ==
Following the death of his father Idris I (who lost his life marching against the rival caliph, Yahya al-Mu'tasim, who was in control of the capital Marrakesh), Abd al-Wāḥid became the new caliph, marking the beginning of the final fragmentation of the Almohad Caliphate. He was not able to oust Yahya from Marrakesh, while the Emir of Tlemcen become independent from 1236 (founding the Zayyanid dynasty), following the example of the Hafsid ruler Abu Zakariya Yahya in Tunisia. Due to unrest in the southern part of the caliphate, he had to turn his attention away from recapturing Marrakesh and Tlemcen and focused on quelling the rebellions in the southern Sahara realm of the caliphate. He campaigned against the rebels in the Sahara decisively crushing them and ending their rebellion in 1239. He then focused his attention towards recapturing his lost territories.

=== Death and succession ===
In 1242 Abd al-Wahid ordered his governor to fight another secession, that of the Marinid Abu Yahya ibn Abd al-Haqq, who had captured Fes. However, Abd al-Wahid was discovered drowned in a pool (or he died from a fall) in his palace in December of the same year. He was succeeded by his brother Abu al-Hasan as-Said al-Mutadid.

== Sources ==
- Julien, Charles-André. Histoire de l'Afrique du Nord, des origines à 1830, Payot, Paris, 1994.

Preceded by Idris I	Almohad dynasty 1232–1242	Succeeded by Abu al-Hasan as-Said al-Mutadid
