= Abu Hafs Umar al-Murtada =

Almohad Caliph from 1248 to 1266

Abū Ḥafṣ ‘Umar al-Murtaḍā
- Almohad caliph
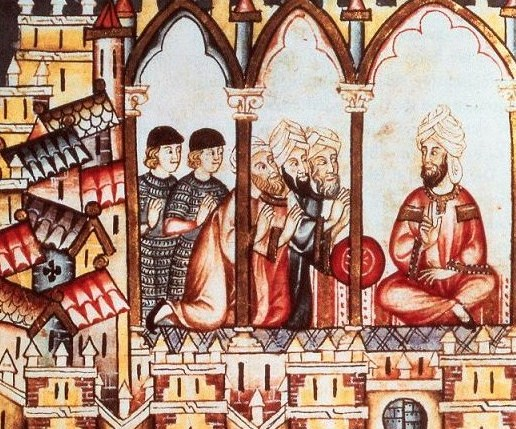
- Castilian ambassadors meeting al-Murtaḍā, from the Cantigas de Santa Maria.

Ruler of the Almohad Caliphate
- Reign: 1248–1266
- Predecessor: Abu al-Hasan as-Said al-Mutadid
- Successor: Idris al-Wathiq
- Died: 1266
Names
- Abu Hafs Umar al-Murtada ibn Ishaq
- Dynasty: Almohad
- Father: Abu Ibrahim Ishaq ibn Yusuf
- Religion: Islam

Abū Ḥafṣ ‘Umar al-Murtaḍā (Arabic: أبو حفص عمر المرتضى بن أبي إبراهيم اسحاق بن يوسف بن عبد المؤمن; died 1266) was an Almohad caliph who reigned over parts of present-day Morocco from 1248 until his death.

== Life ==
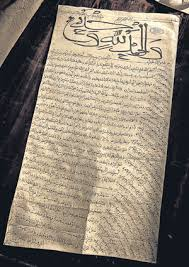
A letter from Abu Hafs Umar al-Murtada to Pope Innocent IV.

During his reign, the area of present-day Morocco under Almohad control was reduced to the region around and including Marrakesh. He was forced to pay tribute to the Marinids. He was ousted by his cousin Abu al-Ula al-Wathiq Idris with the help of Marinid ruler Abu Yusuf Yaqub ibn Abd Al-Haqq, with Idris II then proclaiming himself as caliph.

He was interested in Maghrebi script and established the first public manuscript transcription center at the madrasa attached to his mosque in Marrakesh.

== Sources ==
- Julien, Charles-André. Histoire de l'Afrique du Nord, des origines à 1830, Payot, Paris, 1994.

Preceded by Abu al-Hasan as-Said al-Mutadid	Almohad dynasty 1248–1266	Succeeded by Idris II
