= Abdallah al-Adil =

Almohad Caliph from 1224 to 1227

Abdallah al-Adil عَبْدُ اللهِ العَادِلُ
- Almohad Caliph
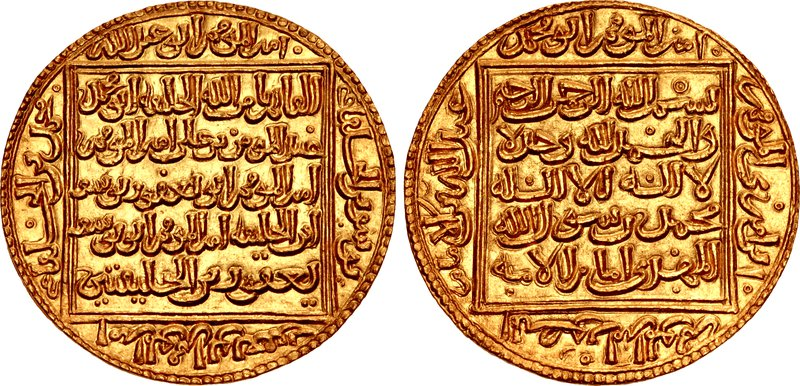
- Gold dinar of Abdallah al-Adil

Ruler of the Almohad Caliphate
- Reign: September 1224 – October 4, 1227
- Predecessor: Abdul-Wahid I
- Successor: Yahya
- Died: October 4, 1227
Names
- Abu Muhammad Abdallah al-Adil
- Dynasty: Almohad
- Father: Yaqub al-Mansur
- Religion: Islam

Abu Muhammad ʿAbdallah 'al-ʿAdil' (Arabic: عبد الله العادل ʿAbd Allāh; d. October 4, 1227) was an Almohad Caliph, a former governor in al-Andalus who challenged and secured the murder of his predecessor, Abd al-Wahid I. His 1224 coup ushered in a period of instability that lasted well beyond his own death in 1227. He is often regarded as one of the most disastrous of Almohad caliphs. His coup divided the Almohads and set in motion the loss of al-Andalus and the eventual collapse of the Almohad state.

== Biography ==
=== Birth and background ===
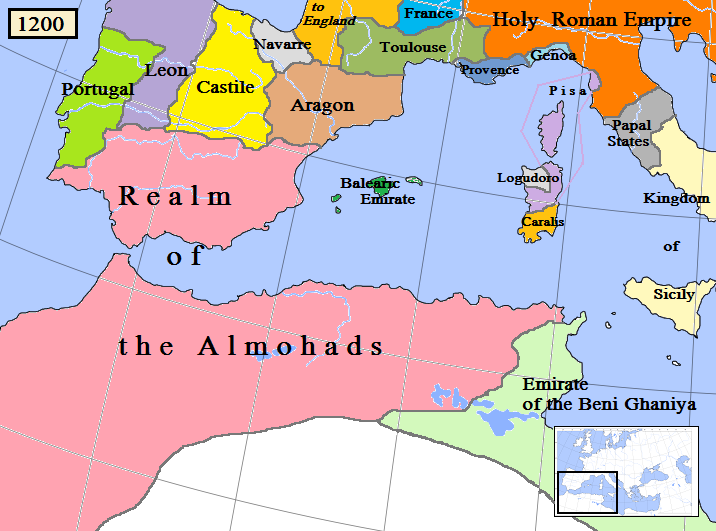
Almohad realm of the 13th century

Abu Muhammad Abdallah was a son of Almohad conqueror Yaqub al-Mansur and a brother of the famous caliph Muhammad al-Nasir. Along with his other brothers, Abdallah served as an Almohad governor in al-Andalus.

In January 1224, the young Caliph Yusuf II al-Mustansir and nephew of Abdallah, prematurely died without heirs. In response, the Marrakesh palace bureaucrats, led by the vizier Abu Sa'id Uthman ibn Jami'i and the regional Masmuda tribal sheikhs, engineered the election of his elderly grand-uncle as the new caliph Abd al-Wahid I, and presented this to the remaining Almohad family members as a fait accompli. Abdallah, then governing in Murcia, and his brothers, Abu al-'Ala Idris (governing in Córdoba), Abu Musa (in Málaga) and Abu al-Hassan (in Granada), who formed a powerful clique in Almohad hierarchy, were upset at the hastiness and the probable unconstitutionality of the Marrakesh proceedings. Moreover, Abd al-Wahid I, despite his age, had a distinguished record and centralising tendencies, and was less likely to give the brothers free rein in al-Andalus as the young and neglectful Yusuf II had done.

The Almohad dynasty had never had a disputed succession. Despite disagreements, they had always loyally lined up behind the elected caliph, so rebellion was no casual matter. But Abdallah was soon visited in Murcia by the shadowy figure of Abu Zayd ibn Yujjan, a former high bureaucrat in Marrakesh, whose fall had been engineered some years earlier by al-Jami'i, and was now serving a sentence of exile nearby in Chinchilla (Albacete). Ibn Yujjan persuaded Abdallah to contest the election, assuring him of his high connections in the Marrakesh palace and among the Masmuda sheikhs. In consultation with his brothers, Abdallah soon declared himself as the new Almohad caliph, taking up the caliphal title of "al-Adil" ("the Just" or "the Justicer") and immediately seized Seville, and began to make preparations to march on Marrakesh and confront Abd al-Wahid I. In the meantime Ibn Yajjan worked on his Moroccan connections. Before the end of the summer, Abu Zakariya, the sheikh of the Hintata tribe, and Yusuf ibn Ali, governor of Tinmal, declared for al-Adil, seized the Marrakesh palace, deposed the caliph and expelled al-Jami'i and his coterie. The fallen caliph Abd al-Wahid I was murdered by strangulation in September 1224.

=== Aftermath ===
Abdallah al-Adil's murderous breach of dynastic precedence and constitutional propriety shocked the rest of the Almohads. But Abdallah and his brothers were dominant in al-Andalus, and had little trouble imposing themselves on the province, replacing those who refused to recognize the usurpation. In al-Andalus, everyone fell in line, with the notable exception of three of Abdallah's cousins, (the sons of Abu Abd Allah Muhammad ibn Abi Hafs, the powerful governor of Ifriqiya): Abu Zayd (governor of Valencia), Abd Allah (governor of Jaén) and Abu Dabbus. They were promptly deprived of their posts. The Jaén governor, Abd Allah (nicknamed "al-Bayyasi", the Baezan), took a small group of followers and set up camp in the hills of Baeza, calling for open rebellion against al-Adil.

In Morocco, Abdallah al-Adil's coup had barely succeeded. Many of the Masmuda tribal sheikhs, unwilling to see the balance in the Almohad coalition swinging into the hands of the Almohads of Spain, invoked their constitutional role, and refused to ratify al-Adil's usurpation, rallying instead around the figure of his nephew Yahya, the son of al-Nasir. With the coup in danger of being reversed, Abdallah al-Adil made the fateful decision to begin shipping the bulk of the Almohad forces in Spain across the straits to Morocco, intending to march on Marrakesh and imposing himself on the sheikhs.

Eager to depart, al-Adil undertook only a half-hearted effort to dislodge al-Bayyasi from the hills of Baeza in the winter of 1224–25. The campaign proved a humiliation – al-Bayyasi's little band of followers managed to fend off the much larger armies that al-Adil sent after them. Al-Adil quickly acquired a reputation for incompetence and poor military skills, which spread across the water to Morocco, emboldening the recusants and shaking the confidence of his allies. Determined to seize Marrakesh before it was too late, al-Adil decided to ignore al-Bayyasi and stepped up the transportation of troops. Al-Bayyasi, in the meantime, struck up an alliance with the hitherto quiet Ferdinand III of Castile. Bemused at the turn of events, and delighted at the evacuation of Almohad troops, Ferdinand sensed an opportunity and decided to lend al-Bayyasi a large Castilian army.

In 1225, al-Bayyasi's band, accompanied by the Castilian army, descended from the Baeza hills. With al-Andalus practically denuded of Almohad troops, they ravaged the lands of Jaén, the vega de Granada and by the end of the summer, al-Bayyasi had captured the city of Córdoba. Seeing the vacuum, Alfonso IX of Leon and Sancho II of Portugal also took the opportunity to launch their own raids. Caceres held up the Leonese, but the Portuguese raiders, facing no opposition, advanced rapidly and reached the outskirts of Seville in late 1225.

=== Heroes and cowards ===
Caliph Al-Adil, his minister Abu Zayd ibn Yajjan and leading Almohad commanders were at that moment in Seville, but they did not have the manpower to challenge the Christian army in the open. As a result, the Portuguese raiders ravaged the outlying areas with impunity. At length, the civilian population of Seville, disgusted at the inactivity of the Almohad rulers, decided to take matters into their own hands. A popular levy was raised in the city and marched out on their own to meet the Portuguese in the field. It was a massacre. The Portuguese men-at-arms mowed down the poorly armed townsfolk. Thousands – in one report as many as 20,000 – were slain before the walls of Seville.

Blame for the Seville massacre – and other disasters – was placed fully on the incompetence and cowardice of Caliph al-Adil and his Almohad lieutenants. But al-Adil's fortunes soon turned. Al-Bayyasi had promised three frontier fortresses to Ferdinand III in payment for his services. But one of the fortresses, Capilla, refused to allow itself to be passed over. The Castilians were forced to lay a long and difficult siege. The brave defiance of little Capilla, and al-Bayyasi's shipping of provisions to the Castilian besiegers, soon turned opinion against al-Bayyasi and back towards the Almohad Caliph. An uprising in Cordoba followed, al-Bayyasi was killed and his head dispatched to the Caliph in Marrakesh.

But Abdallah al-Adil did not relish this victory for long. On October 4, 1227, he was drowned in a palace bathtub, and his nephew and rival was elected as the new Almohad Caliph Yahya 'al-Mutasim'.

Preceded by Abdul-Wahid I	Almohad dynasty 1224–1227	Succeeded by Yahya
