= Kingdom of Africa =

12th century Norman area in North Africa

Kingdom of Sicily and its territories in 1154

The Kingdom of Africa was an extension of the frontier zone of the Kingdom of Sicily in the former Roman province of Africa (Ifrīqiya in Arabic), (Note: Before it was finally conquered by the Muslims, this province was reorganised as the Byzantine exarchate of Africa.) corresponding to Tunisia and parts of Algeria and Libya today. The main primary sources for the kingdom are Arabic (Muslim); (Note: All the Arabic sources can be found in Michele Amari, Biblioteca Arabo-Sicula (Rome and Turin: 1880).) the Latin (Christian) sources are scanter. (Note: According to Hubert Houben, since "Africa" was never mentioned in the royal title of the kings of Sicily, "one ought not to speak of a 'Norman kingdom of Africa'". Rather, "[Norman Africa] really amounted to a constellation of Norman-held towns along coastal Ifrīqiya.")

While the island of Djerba was conquered by Roger II in 1135, conquests of mainland Africa started between 1146–1148. Sicilian rule consisted of military garrisons in the major towns, exactions on the local Muslim population, protection of Christians, and the minting of coin. The local aristocracy was largely left in place, and Muslim princes controlled the civil government under Sicilian oversight. Economic connections between Sicily and Africa, which were strong before the conquest, were strengthened, while ties between Africa and northern Italy were expanded. Early in the reign of William I, the Kingdom of Africa fell to the Almohad Caliphate (1158–1160). Its most enduring legacy was the realignment of Mediterranean powers brought about by its demise and the Siculo-Almohad peace finalised in 1180.

== Background ==
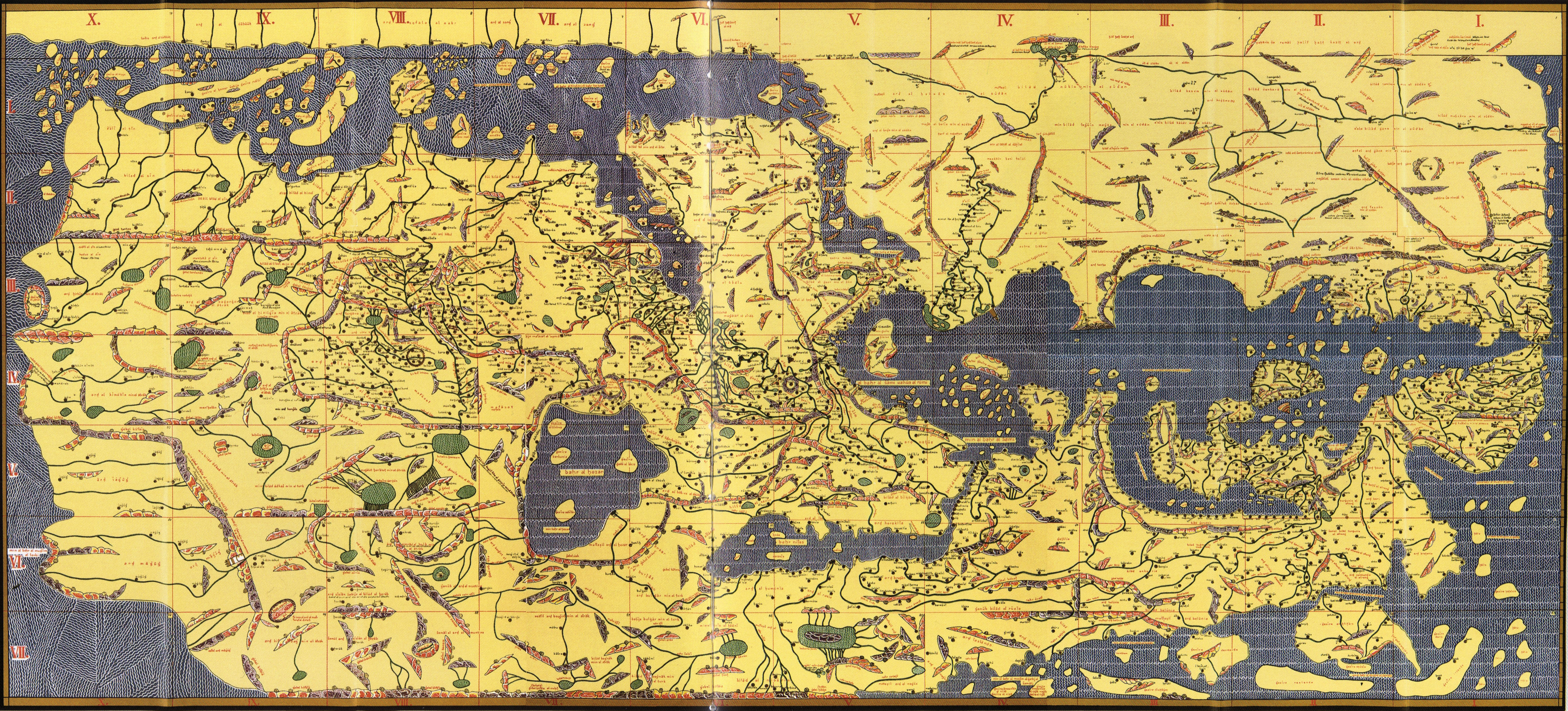
The Tabula Rogeriana, an early world map drawn by Muhammad al-Idrisi for Roger II of Sicily in 1154. Note that the north is at the bottom, and so the map appears "upside down" compared to modern cartographic conventions. Al-Idrisi is also the author of the historical-biographical Book of Roger.

Regarding the motive for the Normans' military involvement in Africa, historian David Abulafia raises three possibilities: religious ("the extension of crusading activity into a relatively neglected arena"), economic (such as "the protection of key trade routes"), or imperialistic ("an attempt to build a vast Mediterranean empire").

=== Economic motives ===
Sicily and Africa had close and growing economic ties during the period 1050–1150. The Sicilians imported gold, shipped by caravan across the Sahara to Kairouan (Qayrawan) and Mahdia (al-Mahdiyya), and cloth manufactured of Egyptian and local flax or cotton imported from India and Sicily. Besides this cotton, the Sicilians exported large quantities of wheat, cheese and processed meats. The Greek Orthodox monastery of San Salvatore in Messina was permitted to export its surplus wheat to north Africa in return for wax for its candles. During this time, Africa (i.e., the old Roman province) underwent rapid urbanisation as famines depopulated the countryside and industry shifted from agriculture to manufactures. The depredations of the Banū Hilal and the Banū Sulaym also destroyed many fields and orchards, and forced the population to seek refuge in the towns.

Count Roger I of Sicily (1071–1101) is known to have maintained men in Mahdia to collect export duties, while Roger II (count from 1105, king 1130–1154) twice sent forces against African towns when their rulers defaulted on payments for grain imports. In 1117, when Rafi, governor of Gabès, challenged the trading monopoly of his overlord, Ali ibn Yahyā, emir of Mahdia, he asked Roger for assistance. (Note: Reported in an-Nuwayrī, Nihayat al-Arab, and Abu Muhammad Abdallah at-Tijani, Rihlah. The Cairo Geniza shows how north African trade was monopolised by Tunis and Mahdia.) Rafi was trying to send out a merchant ship from his own port, and Roger responded by sending a small flotilla, which fled when confronted by Mahdian forces. Ali then arrested the Sicilian agents in his town and requested help from his allies, the Almoravids, and Roger pleaded with him to return relations to normal. A low-level naval war of raids and counter-raids ensued between the Normans and the Almoravids into the 1120s. The most serious raid took place against Nicotera in 1122, when women and children were taken captive.

In 1135 Roger II made his first permanent conquest (excluding Pantelleria in 1123). The isle of Djerba, which, according to Arabic sources, "acknowledged no sultan" and was a den of pirates, was captured by Roger, who carried off many of its inhabitants. Sicilian Muslims participated in the conquest of Djerba, but it is unknown what happened to the ancient Jewish community on the island, which was still there (or re-established) in the early thirteenth century. Djerba gave Roger a base from which to exert more influence over Mahdia, which, unable to pay for its grain, was forced to become a protectorate of Sicily by 1142. Its foreign affairs fell to Roger, who forbade alliances with other Muslim states inimical to Sicily, and probably received its customs revenues in lieu of payment for the grain needed to feed it. Roger also had a right to seize any city rebelling against the lordship of the emir of Mahdia. The emir himself, Al-Hasan ibn Ali, whom Ali ibn al-Athīr calls the "prince of Africa", was personally indebted to the Sicilian fisc, quite possibly as a result of his luxurious tastes. One Arabic chronicler noted how "the accursed one [the king of Sicily] imposed the toughest conditions, and he [the emir] had to accept them, and he offered him obedience so that to all intents he became a mere ‘āmil [governor] for Roger".

=== Religiosity ===
Two Latin chronicles, Robert of Torigny's Chronica and the anonymous continuation of Sigebert of Gembloux's Chronica, are the only sources to assign religious motives to Roger's conquest of Africa, coming as it did at the same time as the Second Crusade and the Wendish Crusade. Roger is not known to have received any papal approval for his African venture. The Arabic sources do, however, refer to his army as being recruited from all around Christendom, an assertion which may be more hyperbole than fact. Ibn Idhari says that Roger "called to arms the people of every Latin country". One non-Italian knight, Richard de Lingèvres, did participate in the capture of Tripoli and was rewarded with land in Apulia. He is perhaps the same person as Count Richard of Andria.

=== Ambition ===
There is evidence that at least some of Roger's contemporaries, mostly his enemies, saw his conquests in Africa as usurpations. Gervase of Tilbury, in a suspect passage of his Otia imperialia, implies that the Emperor Frederick I, who regarded Roger as a usurper in southern Italy, was upset by his extending his power into the old Roman province of Africa. (Note: The passage is found in Gottfried Wilhelm Leibniz's edition in the Scriptores rerum Brunsvicensium (Hanover, 1707), i.943, but was omitted from the edition of F. Liebrecht (Hanover, 1856), who regarded it as a later interpolation.) And according to the Erfurt chronicles, at the Diet of Merseburg in 1135, a delegation from the Republic of Venice complained to the Emperor Lothair III that Roger had seized Africa, "one third of the world", from the king of Gretia (Greece). This garbled report completely detaches Roger's actions from the interreligious context by making the victim of his predations a Christian ruler. The Venetians' primary concern was Roger's ambition. (Note: For the Erfurt chronicles, see O. Holder-Egger (ed.), Monumenta Erphesfurtensia saec. XII, XIII, XIV, MGH in usus scholarum (Hanover, 1899), 42.)

Even the chroniclers of Roger's own kingdom believed his ambition played a primary role in his involvement in Africa. Archbishop Romuald II of Salerno in his Chronicon wrote that "because he had a proud heart and a great will to rule, because he was not simply content with Sicily and Apulia, he prepared a vast fleet, which he sent to Africa with very many troops, and [Roger] took and held Africa." The pseudonymous court historian "Hugo Falcandus", in his Liber de regno sicilie e epistola ad Petrum panormitane ecclesie thesaurarium, also emphasised Roger's desire to expand his kingdom:

[H]e took care no less by force than by prudence to defeat his enemies and to extend his kingdom to its furthest limits. For he conquered Tripoli in Barbary, Mahdiyya, Sfax, Gabès and many other barbarian cities after undergoing many labours and dangers.

The incorporation of northern Africa into the Sicilian kingdom would have posed no problems for Roger. The cultural connections between Sicily and northern Africa were stronger than those between Sicily and his own peninsular Italian domains.

== Rise and fall of Norman rule in Africa ==
In 1087, when the organisers of the Mahdia campaign asked him for his assistance, Roger I, who since 1076 had an economic treaty with the Tamīm ibn Muʿizz, emir of Tunis, refused, saying, "As far as we are concerned, Africa is always there. When we are strong we will take it."

=== Conquest of Tripoli and Mahdia ===
In 1142/3, Roger II attacked Tripoli but failed, further south down the coast from Mahdia. In 1146 he successfully besieged it. The city had already been depleted by a series of famines and was practically in a state of civil war when Roger's troops assaulted it. It was still an important port on the sea route from the Maghreb to Egypt. Several of the minor emirs in the vicinity of Tripoli sought Sicilian overlordship after this. Yūsuf, the ruler of Gabès, wrote to Roger requesting "the robes and letter of appointment making me wāli of Gabès, and I shall be your deputy there, as are the Banū Matrūh who hold Tripoli from you." Roger complied and Yūsuf, in his new robes, read out the letter of appointment to an assemblage of notables. Gabès had long been an irritant to Mahdia, and al-Hasan of Mahdia attacked it and brought back Yūsuf to Mahdia, and stoned him to death. It is possible that Roger's attack on Mahdia in 1148 was a response to this insubordination on the part of its emir, but Ibn al-Athīr suggested that Roger was merely taking advantage of a famine in Africa, despite the fact that he had a treaty with al-Hasan until 1150.

In June 1148 Roger sent his admiral George of Antioch, a former Mahdian officer, against al-Hasan. Off the island of Pantelleria the Sicilian fleet encountered a Mahdia ship bearing some carrier pigeons. George had the birds sent home with false messages that the fleet was headed for Byzantium. When the Sicilians reached Mahdia on 22 June, the emir and his court fled the unprepared city leaving their treasure behind. This was seized as booty, but the Sicilians were given only two hours to plunder the city while its Muslim inhabitants took refuge in Christian homes and churches. Roger quickly issued a royal protection, or amān, to all the city's inhabitants. According to Ibn Abī Dīnār, George "restored both cities of Zawīla and Mahdiyya; lent money to the merchants; gave alms to the poor; placed the administration of justice in the hands of qadi acceptable to the population; and arranged well the government of these two cities." Food was released to encourage refugees to return.

On 1 July the city of Sousse (Susa), ruled by al-Hasan's son ‘Ali, surrendered without a fight, and ʿAli fled to his father in Almohad Morocco. On 12 July Sfax fell after a short resistance. The Africans "were treated humanely" and an amān full of "fine promises" was granted for the entire province, according to Ibn al-Athīr. Ibn Khaldun, in his Kitab al-Ibar, records the abuse the Christians of Sfax heaped on their Muslim neighbours. The Banū Matrūh were left in power in Tripoli, and in Sfax Roger appointed Umar ibn al-Husayn al-Furrīānī, whose father was brought to Sicily as a hostage for his son's good behaviour. The Arabic sources are unanimous in presenting Umar's father as encouraging his son to rebel nonetheless. The town of Barasht (Bresk, in Algeria) and the isles of Kerkennah fell to Roger, as did the unruly desert tribes. After the brief period of conquest and acquisition, "the dominion of the Franks [Normans] extended from Tripoli to the borders of Tunis, and from the western Maghrib to Qayrawan".

After the Almohads took the city of Bougie, upon which Roger may have had designs, in 1152, a fleet under Philip of Mahdia was sent to conquer Bône. According to Ibn al-Athīr, Philip was a secret Muslim who treated the inhabitants of Bône gently.

=== Submission of Tunis and internal unrest ===
Roger became involved in a war with Byzantium after 1148, and so was unable to follow up his conquests with an attack on Tunis. In fear, the Tunisians sent grain to Sicily in hopes of averting an attack, according to Ibn Idhari. This should probably be seen as tribute and submission, since Ibn Idhar writes that Roger was still in power in the city when the Almohads attacked it in 1159, although he was in fact dead. The Venetian chronicler Andrea Dandolo is probably correct in asserting: "and the kings of Tunis paid him [Roger] tribute" (regemque Tunixii sibi tributarium fecit). Roger died in 1154, and was succeeded by his son William I, who continued to rule Africa. His accession was taken for an opportunity by the native officials, who clamoured for more powers to tax. The Arabic historians Ibn al-Athīr and Ibn Khaldun, both hoped that Roger would defend his African lands against Almohad extremism and intolerance. After his death, some Muslim officials demanded that sermons be preached against the Almohads in the mosques.

The inhabitants of Africa, overwhelmingly Muslim by this time, generally preferred Muslim rule to Christian, and as the Almohads advanced eastward, William I's native governors made contacts with his Moroccan foes. The local uprisings in favour of the Almohads were well-organised, and Ibn al-Athīr and Ibn Khaldun connect them with the contemporaneous Sicilian uprising engineered by Maio of Bari. Among the rebels was Umar ibn al-Husayn al-Furrīānī, and among the cities lost was Zawīla, a suburb of Mahdia. It was reconquered, and served as a place of refuge for Christians escaping Almohad persecution in the last days of Norman Africa.

=== Almohad invasion ===
After having regained his authority William sent the fleet against Tinnīs in Egypt (c.1156), which Roger may have attacked as early as 1153/4. (Note: William's expedition is found in Abuʿl-Fida (Abulfeda), A Concise History of Humanity, and Roger's in Ibn al-Athīr.) In 1157/8—the chronology of these events is difficult to establish—a Sicilian fleet raided Ibiza in the Muslim Balearics. The Italian Arabist Michele Amari suggested that this last was an endeavour to interrupt the Almohads' shipping routes, but Ibiza lies well to the north of the African coast. From Ibiza the fleet had to come to the aid of Mahdia, which was under threat from Almohad forces.

All of Norman Africa was essentially abandoned to the Almohads save Mahdia. Tripoli fell in 1158, and Mahdia was under siege from late in the summer of 1159. In response to the Almohad caliph's question, "Why did you ever abandon so strongly-fortified a place as that?", al-Hasan, who was in his camp, is said to have replied, "Because I had few in whom I could place my trust; because food was lacking; and because it was the will of fate." In response, Caliph ʿAbd al-Muʾmin is said to have temporarily abandoned the siege in order to construct two large mounds of wheat and barley. Sfax, which had been in revolt against William for some time, accepted Almohad overlordship during the siege, while the city of Gabès was taken by force. In January 1160 Mahdia was breached and ʿAbd al-Muʾmin gave its remaining Christians and Jews the option of Islam or death.

=== Afterwards ===
Hugo Falcandus blamed the fall of Africa, and the resulting persecution of African Christians, on William I and Maio of Bari's intransigence. A final peace with the Almohads was not signed until 1180, when a Sicilian naval vessel intercepted a ship bearing the daughter of the caliph Yūsuf to Spain. According to Pietro da Eboli's Liber ad honorem Augusti, the caliph offered to pay annual tribute in return for the return of the princess. (Note: This episode probably forms the basis for one of the tales in Giovanni Boccaccio's Decameron.) A special office, the duana de secretis, was formed in Palermo to oversee incoming tribute payments. Robert of Torigny even says that two cities, Africa (Mahdia) and Sibilia (Zawīla), were returned to them, but in fact they probably only received warehouses and commercial facilities in these places. After the treaty, the Sicilians and Almohads exhibited a shared interest in stemming the expansion of Ayyubid Egypt, and William II of Sicily turned his attention (1180–82) to the piracy of the Banū Jānīyah who ruled the Balearics and were avowed enemies of the Almohads.

Later Anglo-Norman writers refer to a one-line, rhyming poem (monosticum): APVLVS ET CALABER, SICVLVS MICHI SERVIT ET AFER ("Apulia and Calabria, Sicily and Africa serve me"). Radulphus de Diceto, in his Decani Lundoniensis Opuscula, briefly narrates the Norman conquest of southern Italy and then quotes the above line. Ralph Niger wrote that the line appeared on a seal of Roger II's, while a dubious passage in Gervase of Tilbury says that Roger had it inscribed on his sword. Andrea Dandolo referred to the legend of the sword, which was apparently well known in fourteenth-century Venice. A similar line to the monosticum appears in a mid-twelfth-century encomium on Rouen, the capital of Normandy. The anonymous poet refers to Roger II as "ruler of Italy and Sicily, Africa, Greece and Syria" and suggests that Persia, Ethiopia and Germany fear him. (Note: The poem bears resemblance in this respect to the classicising verse of Leo of Vercelli in praise of Otto III and Gregory V (c.1000), in which he notes that Africa, Syria and Greece submit to them.)

== Administration ==
There is a tradition that Roger, after conquering Africa, took the title rex Africae (King of Africa). According to C.-E. Dufourcq, however, this was a mistake first committed by eighteenth-century copyists, who mistranscribed certain charters, placing Africae in place of Apuliae. There is at least one surviving private Sicilian charter which refers to Roger as "our lord of Sicily and Italy and also of all Africa most serene and invincible king crowned by God, pious, fortunate, triumphant, always august". (Note: Dominus noster Sycilie et Ytalie nec non et tocius Africe serenissimus et invictissimus rex a Deo coronatus pius felix triumphator semper augustus. The definitive source of Sicilian diplomas is K. A. Kehr, Die Urkunden der normannisch-sizilischen Könige (Innsbruck, 1902).) Royal charters universally use the title "King of Sicily, of the Duchy of Apulia, and of the Principality of Capua". One tombstone from Palermo, that of the royal priest Grizantus, dated to 1148, refers to Roger in its Arabic and Judeo-Arabic inscriptions as "king (malik) of Italy, Longobardia, Calabria, Sicily and Africa (Ifrīqiyya).

The government of Norman Africa was modelled carefully on the precedents offered by the pre-Norman emirs. As in Sicily, close attention was paid to the interests of the Muslim population, while the Christians benefit from the exemption from the poll-tax... Apart from the garrisons in the African towns, and apart from the use of Norman-style cavalry charges, evidence for the presence of 'Norman' or 'Frankish' characteristics cannot be found. The architects of the African empire were not 'Normans' but Greek and Arabic courtiers...

=== Economy ===
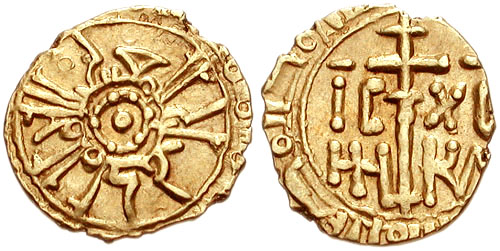
A gold Sicilian tarì minted at Palermo during Roger II's reign. Sicily depended on African gold for its mints, but the dinars of Africa were of superior gold to the tarìs of Sicily.

Control of Africa gave Sicily control of all the sea routes between the western and eastern Mediterranean. Roger II taxed shipping, although he seems to have allowed the local Muslims princelings to collect some tariffs of their own. Ibn Abī Dīnār states that the wāli of Gabès collected taxes in Roger's name. Because of Sicily's good relations with Fatimid Egypt, Italian merchant ships could travel along the entire north African shore in peace during this period. Roger also taxed the overland caravan routes from Morocco to Egypt ("Kairouan" and "caravan" are cognates.) More profitable than these were the trans-Saharan caravans carrying paiole gold dust for the mints of northern African and southern Italy. An important stopping point for these was Bougie, which Roger may have attacked during this period, but over which he could not extend authority, although he did maintain links with the deposed emir Yahyā ibn al-ʿAzīz.

At Mahdia, Roger I and William I minted dinars of pure gold, 22 mm in diameter and weighing 4.15 g with Cufic inscriptions, probably for internal circulation in Africa. The only two known coins were first discovered by the Tunisian scholar H. H. Abdul-Wahab in 1930. They were a close imitation of a type minted by the Fatimid caliph al-Zahir (1020–35) over a century earlier. In Fatimid fashion, the coins have inscriptions in two concentric circles with two lines of text in the centre. The circular text is the same on both sides, while the central text differs. In Roger's coin, it reads "Struck by order of the sublime king (al-malik al-muʿaẓẓam) Roger, the powerful through God [Allah], in the city of Mahdia, in the year 543 [of the Hijrah]", that is, 1148/49, in the outer circle and "Praise be to God, it is fitting to praise him and, indeed, He is deserving and worthy [of praise]" in the inner circle. The obverse centre reads "The King Roger", while the reverse centre contains his laqab "The powerful through God" (al-Muʿtazz bi-ʾllāh). William's coin is similar, but is dated to is dated to 549 (1154/5) and replaces Roger's Arabic laqab with his own, al-Hādī bi-Amr Allāh ("the Guide according to the command of God"). It has been observed that the inscriptions bear a resemblance to those of Robert Guiscard's tarì struck at Palermo in 1072. In both cases the mint would have been staffed entirely by Muslims.

=== Religion ===
As ruler of Africa, Roger aimed to encourage Muslim refugees in Sicily to re-settle in Africa, and issued a decree to this effect. He maintained the loyalty of his African domains by offering grain. Norman Africa "became rich and prosperous, while the remainder of Barbary and the great part of the Middle East felt the harsh pangs of hunger" during this period of constant famines. According to Ibn al-Athīr, Tripoli prospered under Roger: "the Sicilians and the Rūm [the north Italians, Greeks, etc.] frequented it [for the sake of commerce], with the result that it became repopulated and prospered". Merchants from Genoa with ties to Sicily began trading with Tripoli as well.

Roger left religious and judicial authority in local hands, under a local governor (ʿāmil). In each town there was a Sicilian garrison under a Sicilian commander, and a poll tax (jizyah) was instituted on the Muslim communities, similar to that which they had until then exacted from Jews and Christians, but lighter than that which was demanded of Sicilian Muslims at the same time. The local Christian community, largely servile and enslaved, probably benefited from Roger's rule for a time. Bishop Cosmas of Mahdia made a trip to Rome to be confirmed by Pope Eugene III and also to Palermo to visit his new sovereign. The anonymous continuator of Sigebert of Gembloux refers to Cosmas as returning to Africa "a free man".

When Mahdia fell to the Almohads in 1160, Cosmas fled to Palermo. The Christians seem to have suffered under Almohad rule from their association with the Sicilians. The native church in Africa is rarely mentioned after that.

== See also ==
- Vandal Kingdom
- African Romance
