= Charles-André Julien =

French journalist and historian (1891–1991)

- Born: 2 September 1891; Caen, France
- Died: 19 July 1991 (aged 99); Paris, France
- Education: University of Paris
- Occupations: Historian, journalist

Charles-André Julien (2 September 1891 – 19 July 1991) was a French journalist and historian specialised in the history of the Maghreb, his most famous work is Histoire de l'Afrique du Nord : Des origines à 1830 (History of North Africa from the origins to 1830).

Charles-André Julien was born in Caen, northern France and emigrated with his family to Algeria (then under French occupation) at the age of 15, where he picked up an interest in the history of the region. Julien's History of North Africa served as the standard reference work on the subject for decades. His political commitments and specialized knowledge of North Africa contributed to his place on the Popular Front's Haut Comité méditerranéen et de l'Afrique du Nord from 1936 to 1939 and election to the Council of the French Union from 1946 to 1958. Julien opposed French colonialism, arguing that political rights should be extended to colonized subjects.

Charles-André Julien taught at the Mohammed V University of Rabat and the Sorbonne of Paris. He was also a regular columnist at the French daily Le Monde.

== Bibliography ==
- Histoire de l'Afrique du Nord: Des origines à 1830, Payot (1931)
- L'Afrique du Nord en marche, Omnibus, ISBN 2-258-05863-5
- Les voyages de découverte et les premiers établissements (XVe-XVIe siècles), Paris, PUF, 1948.
- Et la Tunisie devint indépendante, 1951–1957, édition Jaguar/Jeune Afrique, ISBN 2-85258-372-0
- Histoire de l'Afrique blanche, Paris, PUF, 1966.
- Une pensée anticoloniale, Sindbad, ISBN 2-7274-0036-5
- Techniciens de la Colonisation, Pays d'Outre-Me, ISBN 2-13-040839-7
- Histoire de l'Algérie contemporaine – tome 1 seul : la conquête et les débuts de la colonisation 1827–1871
