= Idris al-Wathiq =

Almohad caliph from 1266 to 1269

- Amir al-Mu'minin

Ruler of the Almohad Caliphate
- Reign: 1266–1269
- Predecessor: Abu Hafs Umar al-Murtada
- Successor: None (post abolished by Marinid dynasty)
- Born: unknown
- Died: 1269
- Dynasty: Almohad
- Religion: Islam

Idris al-Wathiq (Arabic: أبو العلا أبو الدبوس الواثق بالله إدريس بن محمد بن أبي عبد الله محمد بن أبي حفص بن عبد المؤمن; died 1269), known as Abu Dabbus, was the last Almohad ruler who reigned in Marrakesh from 1266 until his death.

== Life ==
Marrakesh had been besieged earlier by the Marinid sultan Abu Yusuf Yaqub ibn Abd Al-Haqq prior to 1266, although unsuccessfully. Idris took advantage of the confused situation to oust his cousin Abu Hafs Umar al-Murtada with Abu Yusuf's support, and to declare himself Almohad caliph, although his power barely extended outside the city. However, the Marinid ruler changed his mind eventually, spurring the Zayyanid Yaghmurasen Ibn Zyan to attack Marrakesh. The siege lasted from 1268 until September 1269, with the fall of the city. Idris al-Wathiq was captured by the combined Marinid-Zayyanid forces and executed.

Idris' death marked the end of the Almohad rule.

== Sources ==
- Julien, Charles-André. Histoire de l'Afrique du Nord, des origines à 1830, Payot, Paris, 1994.

Preceded by Abu Hafs Umar al-Murtada	Almohad dynasty 1266–1269	Succeeded by To the Marinids
