= Muhammad al-Nasir =

Caliph of the Almohads from 1199 to 1213

- Caliph of the Almohads
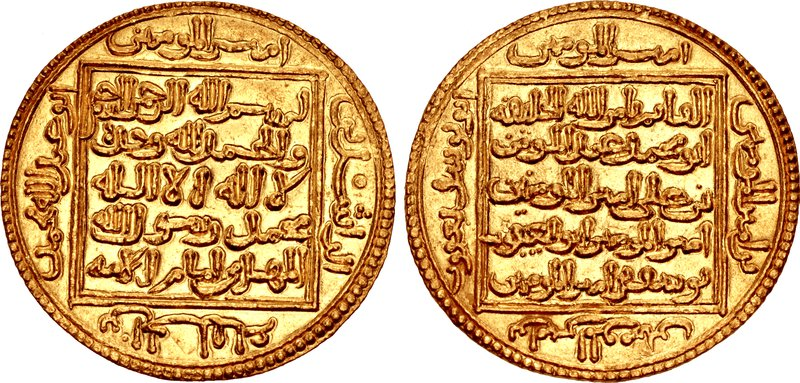

Ruler of the Almohad Caliphate
- Reign: 25 January 1199–1213
- Predecessor: Abu Yusuf Yaqub al-Mansur
- Successor: Yusuf II, Almohad caliph
- Born: c. 1182
- Died: 1213 (aged c. 30–31)
- Spouse: Qamar
- Issue: Yusuf II
- Dynasty: Almohad
- Father: Abu Yusuf Yaqub al-Mansur
- Mother: Zahr
- Religion: Islam
- Arabic name
- Personal (Ism): Muḥammad
- Patronymic (Nasab): ibn Yaʿqūb al-Manṣūr ibn Yūsuf ibn ʿAbd al-Mu’min
- Teknonymic (Kunya): Abū ʿAbdallāh
- Epithet (Laqab): al-Nāṣir li-Dīn Allāh

Muhammad al-Nasir (Arabic: محمد الناصر, Muḥammad an-Nāṣir, c. 1182 – 1213) was the fourth Almohad Caliph from 1199 until his death. Contemporary Christians referred to him as Miramamolín. He took the regnal title of al-Nāṣir li-Dīn Allāh.

On 25 January 1199, al-Nasir's father Abu Yusuf Yaqub al-Mansur died; al-Nasir was proclaimed the new Caliph that very day. Al-Nasir inherited from his father an empire that was showing signs of instability. Because of his father's victories against the Christians in the Iberian Peninsula (Al-Andalus), he was temporarily relieved from serious threats on that front and able to concentrate on combating and defeating Banu Ghaniya attempts to seize Ifriqiya (Tunisia). Needing, after this, to deal with problems elsewhere in the empire, he appointed Abu Muhammad Abd al-Wahid as the governor of Ifriqiya, so unwittingly inaugurating the rule of the Hafsid dynasty there, which lasted until 1574.

== Biography ==
=== Dynasty and Iberian presence ===
He now had to turn his attention back to Iberia, to deal with a Crusade proclaimed by Pope Innocent III at the request of King Alfonso VIII of Castile. This resulted in his defeat by a Christian coalition at the Battle of Las Navas de Tolosa (1212). He died the following year, and was succeeded by his young son Yusuf al-Mustansir, born of Christian slave Qamar.

=== Relationship with King John of England ===
In the early 13th century, John, King of England was under pressure after a quarrel with Pope Innocent III led to England being placed under an interdict, by which all forms of worship and other religious practices were banned. John himself was excommunicated, parts of the country were in revolt and there were threats of a French invasion.

Writing two decades after the events, Matthew Paris, a St Albans chronicler of the early thirteenth century, claims that, in desperation, John sent envoys to al-Nâsir asking for his help. In return John offered to convert to Islam, to make the country at disposal of the caliph and turn England into a Muslim state. Among the delegates was Master Robert, a London cleric. Al-Nâsir was said to be so disgusted by John's grovelling plea that he sent the envoys away. Historians have cast doubt on this story, due to the lack of other contemporary evidence.

=== Viziers ===
- Abu Zayd bin Yujan (1198–1199)
- Abu Muhammad Abd al-Wahid ibn Abi Hafs (1199–1205). (the future Hafsid ruler of Ifriqiya), In October 1205, Abd al-Wahid led a cavalry of 4,000 soldiers and crushed in a battle at Jabal Tājrā southeast of Qābis Yahya ibn Ghaniya, the Banu Ghaniya warlord who attempted to conquer the Maghreb from the Almohads. In January 1206, in the company of the Muhammad al-Nasir, he obtained the surrender of al-Mahdia, whose governor, 'Ali ibn Ghazi, cousin of Yahya, rallied to the Almohad cause.
- Abu Sa`id Uthman ibn Jam`i (1205–1214)

== Bibliography ==
- Baadj, Amar S. (2015). Saladin, the Almohads and the Banu Ghaniya. Leiden: Brill. ISBN 978-90-04-29620-6.
- Brunschwig, Robert (1940). La Berberie Orientale sous les Hafsides. Adrienne-Maisonneuve.
- Charles-André Julien, Histoire de l'Afrique du Nord, des origines à 1830. 1931.

Preceded by Abu Yusuf Ya'qub al-Mansur	Almohad Caliph; 1199–1213	Succeeded by Abu Ya'qub Yusuf II
