= Yusuf II, Almohad caliph =

Caliph of Almohads (c.1203-1224) (ruled 1213-1224)

Yusuf II
- Almohad Caliph

Ruler of the Almohad Caliphate
- Reign: 1213–1224
- Predecessor: Muhammad al-Nasir
- Successor: Abd al-Wahid I
- Born: c. 1203
- Died: 1224 (aged c. 20–21)
- Father: Muhammad al-Nasir
- Mother: Qamar
- Religion: Islam

Abū Yaʿqūb Yūsuf al-Mustanṣir (also known as Yusuf II, c. 1203 – 1224) (Arabic: يوسف بن الناصر Yūsuf bin an-Nāṣir) was Caliph of the Almohads from 1213 until his death. Son of the previous caliph, Muhammad al-Nasir, the ten-year-old Yusuf was unexpectedly appointed heir by his father on his deathbed. He was confirmed as Almohad Caliph in election by the Almohad sheikhs after his father's death, and took up the caliphal title "al-Mustansir bi-Llah" ("he who seeks the aid of God"). Yusuf's mother was a Christian slave Qamar.

== Life ==
Young and pleasure-loving, Yusuf II left the governing of the Almohad empire to a carefully balanced oligarchy composed of older family members, like his father's brothers in al-Andalus and his grand-cousin Abu Abd Allah Muhammad ibn Abi Hafs in Ifriqiya, Marrakesh palace bureaucrats such as the vizier Abu Sa‘id Uthman ibn Jam‘i and the leading sheikhs of the Almohad Masmuda tribes. But without central leadership, and with the Almohad army having suffered grievous losses at the Battle of Navas de Tolosa in 1212, a series of rebellions broke out in the Maghreb which the Almohad oligarchs were hard-pressed to contain, contributing to the eventual breakaway of Ifriqiya under the Hafsid dynasty.

Yusuf II died suddenly in early 1224 – accidentally gored while playing with his pet cows. Lacking heirs, the palace bureaucrats, led by Ibn Jam‘i, quickly engineered the election of his elderly grand-uncle Abd al-Wahid I as the new caliph in Marrakesh. But the hastiness and probable unconstitutionality of the Marrakesh proceedings upset his uncles, the brothers of al-Nasir, in al-Andalus. They promptly disputed the succession, and elected their own Caliph Abdallah al-Adil.

=== His viziers and administration ===
Yusuf had three viziers in the first year of his reign:

- Abu Sa‘id Uthman ibn Jam‘i (1214) (also vizier to Muhammad an-Nasir)
- Abu Yahya al-Hizraji (1214) (أبو يحيى الهزرجي Abū Yaḥyà al-Hizrajī)
- Abu ‘Ali ibn Ashrafi (1214) (أبو علي بن أشرفي Abū ‘Alī b. Ashrafī)
- Abu Sa‘id Uthman ibn Jam‘i (again) (1214–1223)

Abu Sa‘id Uthman ibn Jam‘i would also serve as vizier to Abdul-Wahid I.

== Sources ==
- This article began as a translation of the corresponding article in the French Wikipedia, accessed September 30, 2005.
- Julien, Charles-André (1931). Histoire de l'Afrique du Nord, des origines à 1830.

Preceded by Muhammad al-Nasir	Almohad Dynasty; 1213–1224	Succeeded by Abd al-Wahid I
