= Yaqub al-Mansur =

Ruler of the Almohad Caliphate from 1184 to 1199

- Amir al-Mu'minin
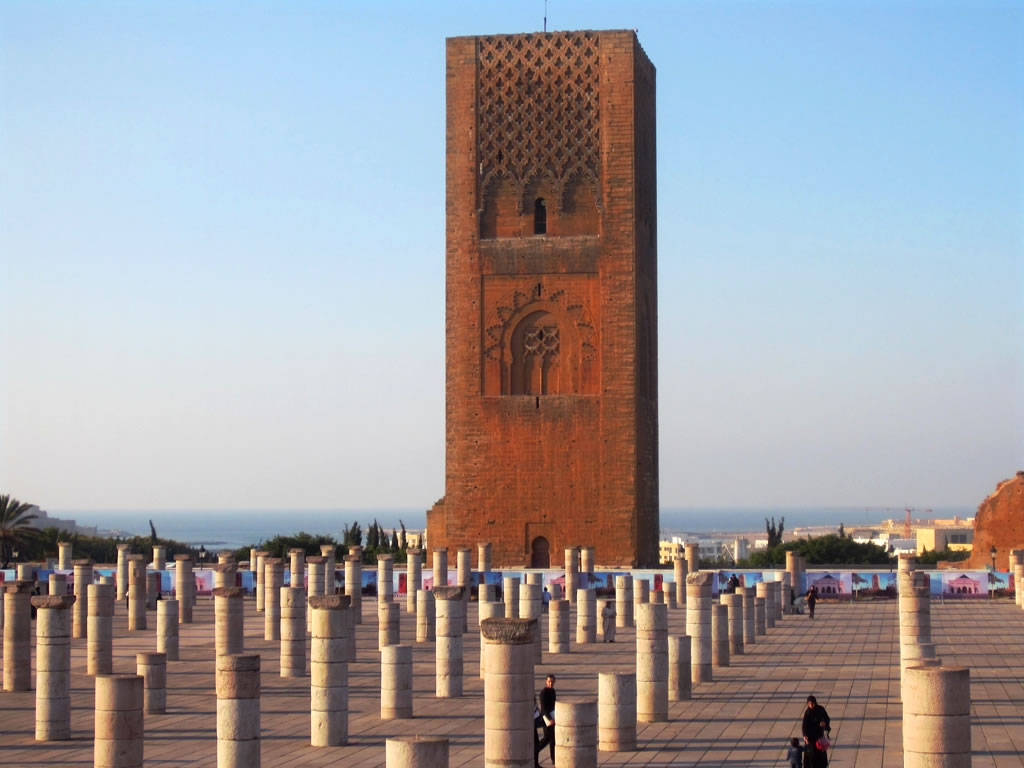
- Yaʿqūb al-Manṣūr's unfinished mosque in Rabat

Ruler of the Almohad Caliphate
- Reign: 1184–1199
- Predecessor: Abu Yaqub Yusuf
- Successor: Muhammad al-Nasir
- Died: 23 January 1199 (aged 38–39); Marrakesh
- Burial: Tinmal
- Spouse: Ammet Allah bint Abu Isaac; Safiya bint Abu Abdallah ben Merdnych
- Issue: Muhammad al-Nasir; Idris al-Ma'mun
Names
- Abū Yūsuf Yaʿqūb ibn Yūsuf ibn Abd al-Muʾmin al-Manṣūr
- Dynasty: Almohad
- Father: Abu Yaqub Yusuf
- Religion: Islam

Abū Yūsuf Yaʿqūb ibn Yūsuf ibn Abd al-Muʾmin al-Manṣūr (Arabic: أبو يوسف يعقوب بن يوسف بن عبد المؤمن المنصور; d. 23 January 1199), commonly known as Yaqub al-Mansur (يعقوب المنصور) or Moulay Yacoub (مولاي يعقوب), was the third Almohad caliph. Succeeding his father, al-Mansur reigned from 1184 to 1199. His reign was distinguished by the flourishing of trade, architecture, philosophy and the sciences, as well as by victorious military campaigns in which he was successful in repelling the tide of the Reconquista in the Iberian Peninsula.

== Early life ==
His father was Abu Yaqub Yusuf whilst his mother was a Christian concubine called Sahir. According to Arabic specialist, Rom Landau, Yusuf's mother was a "Negro slave". He would later acquire the name Ya'qub the Victorious.

== Reign ==
=== Military activities ===
Al-Mansur's father was killed in Portugal on 29 July 1184; upon reaching Seville with his father's body on 10 August, he was immediately proclaimed the new caliph. Al-Mansur vowed revenge for his father's death, but fighting with the Banu Ghaniya delayed him in Africa. After inflicting a new defeat on the Banu Ghaniya, he set off for the Iberian Peninsula to avenge his father's death.

His 13 July 1190 siege of Tomar, center of the Portuguese Templars, failed to capture the fortress. However, further south, he in 1191 recaptured a major fortress, Paderne Castle and the surrounding territory near Albufeira, in the Algarve – which had been controlled by the Portuguese army of King Sancho I since 1182. Having inflicted other defeats on the Christians and captured major cities, he returned to the Maghreb with three thousand Christian captives.

Upon Al-Mansur's return to Africa, however, Christians in Iberian Peninsula resumed the offensive, capturing many of the Moorish cities, including Silves, Vera, and Beja.

When Al-Mansur heard this news, he returned to the Iberian Peninsula, and defeated the Christians again. This time, many were taken in chained groups of fifty each, and later sold in Africa as slaves.

While Al-Mansur was away in Africa, the Christians mounted the largest army of that period, of over 300,000 men, to defeat Al-Mansur. However, immediately upon hearing this, Al-Mansur returned again to Iberia and defeated Castilian King Alfonso VIII Alfonso's army in the Battle of Alarcos, on 18 July 1195. It was said that Al-Mansur's forces killed 150,000 and took money, valuables and other goods "beyond calculation". It was after this victory that he took the title al-Mansur Billah ("Made Victorious by God").

=== Architectural patronage ===
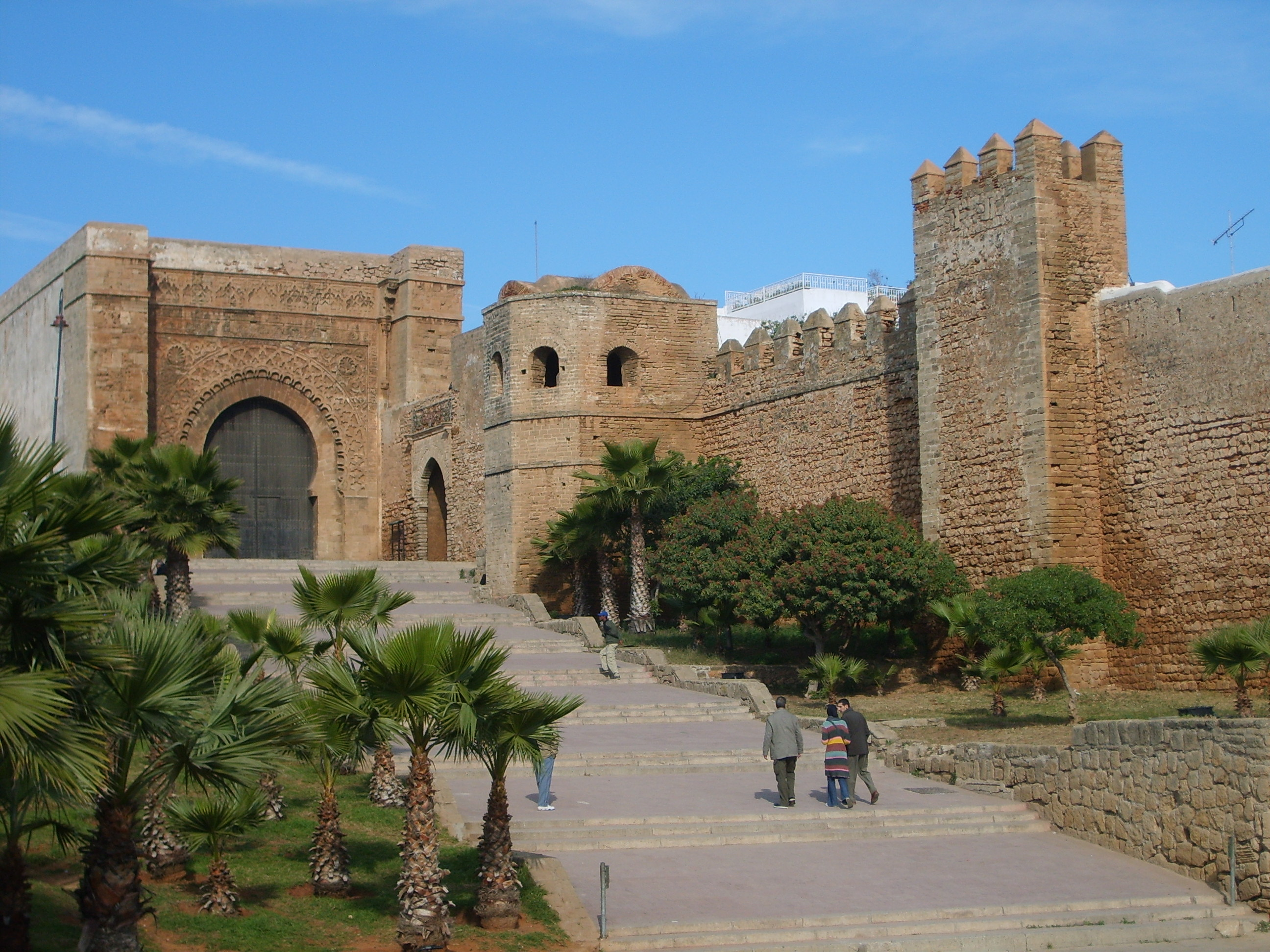
Bab Udaya was added to Qasbat al-Awdaya under al-Mansūr's reign.

During his reign, Al-Mansur undertook several major construction projects. He added a monumental gate to the Kasbah of the Udayas in Rabat, and he may have been responsible for finishing the construction of the current Kutubiyya Mosque in Marrakesh. He also created a vast royal citadel and palace complex in Marrakesh which subsequently remained the seat of government in the city for centuries afterward. This royal district included the Kasbah Mosque (or El-Mansuriyya Mosque) in Marrakesh and was accessed via the monumental gate of Bab Agnaou, both dating from al-Mansur's time. He also embarked on the construction of an even bigger fortified capital in Rabat, where he attempted to build what would have been the world's largest mosque. However, construction on the mosque and on this new citadel stopped after his death. Only the beginnings of the mosque had been completed, including a large part of its massive minaret now known as the Hassan Tower.

Some of Rabat's historic gates, most notably Bab er-Rouah, also date from this time, one of Al-Mansur's famous works is the Bimaristan of Marrakesh, the first hospital in Morocco to be ever built, Al-Mansur embellished it with luxurious ornaments and sculptures, it had gardens, water canals attached to it and it was Funded personally by Almohad's government, it is said that Averroes worked there for some time.

=== Philosophy and religion ===
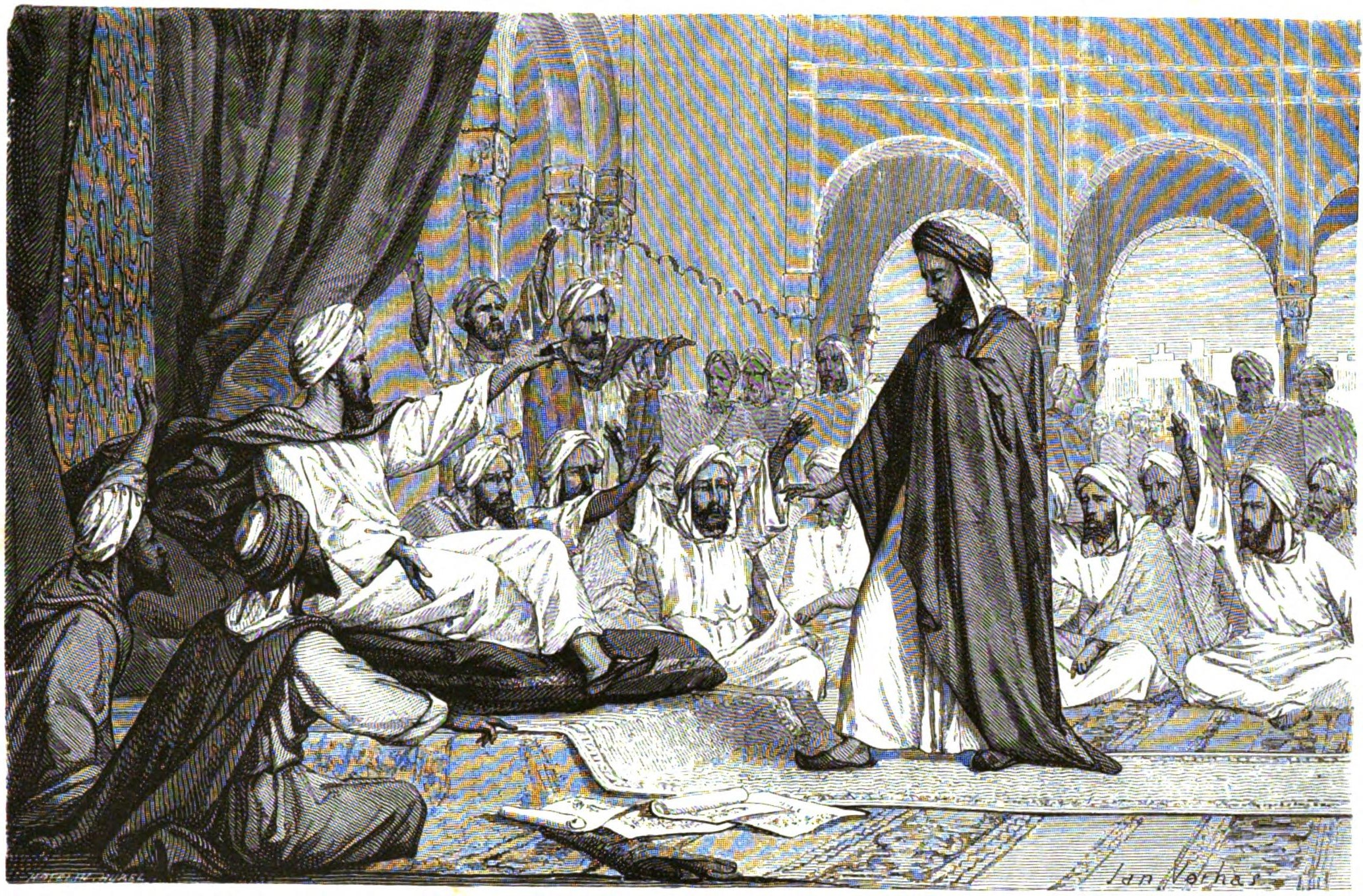
"The Disgrace of Averroes": al-Mansur banishes Averroes from his court (Louis Figuier, 1867 illustration)

Al-Mansur protected the philosopher Averroes and kept him as a favorite at court. Like many of the Almohad caliphs, Al-Mansur was religiously learned. He favored the Zahirite or literalist school of Muslim jurisprudence per Almohad doctrine and possessed a relatively extensive education in the Muslim prophetic tradition; he even wrote his own book on the recorded statements and actions of the prophet Muhammad. Mansur's Zahirism was clear when he ordered his judges to exercise judgment only according to the Qur'an, said recorded statements, and absolute consensus. Mansur's father Abu Yaqub appointed Cordoban polymath Ibn Maḍāʾ as chief judge, and the two of them oversaw the banning of all non-Zahirite religious books during the Almohad reforms; Mansur was not satisfied, and when he inherited the throne, he ordered Ibn Maḍāʾ to actually undertake the burning of such books.

== Death and legacy ==
He died on 23 January 1199 in Marrakesh. He was buried temporarily in his palace in Marrakesh before being taken to his final burial place in Tinmal, where previous Almohad caliphs and Ibn Tumart were also buried.

His victory in Alarcos was remembered for centuries later, when the tide of war turned against the Muslim side. It is recounted by the historian Ibn Abi Zar in his 1326 Rawd al-Qirtas ("History of the Rulers of the Maghreb").

The town of Moulay Yacoub, outside of Fez, Morocco, is named after Al-Mansur, and is best known for its therapeutic hot springs.

Moroccan football club US Yacoub El Mansour is named after the Caliph.

Preceded by Abu Ya'qub Yusuf	Almohad Caliph; 1184–1199	Succeeded by Muhammad al-Nasir
