= Abu Yaqub Yusuf =

Second ruler of Almohad dynasty (r. 1163–1184)

- Amir al-Mu'minin; prev. amir al-muslimin (1163-1168); Caliph
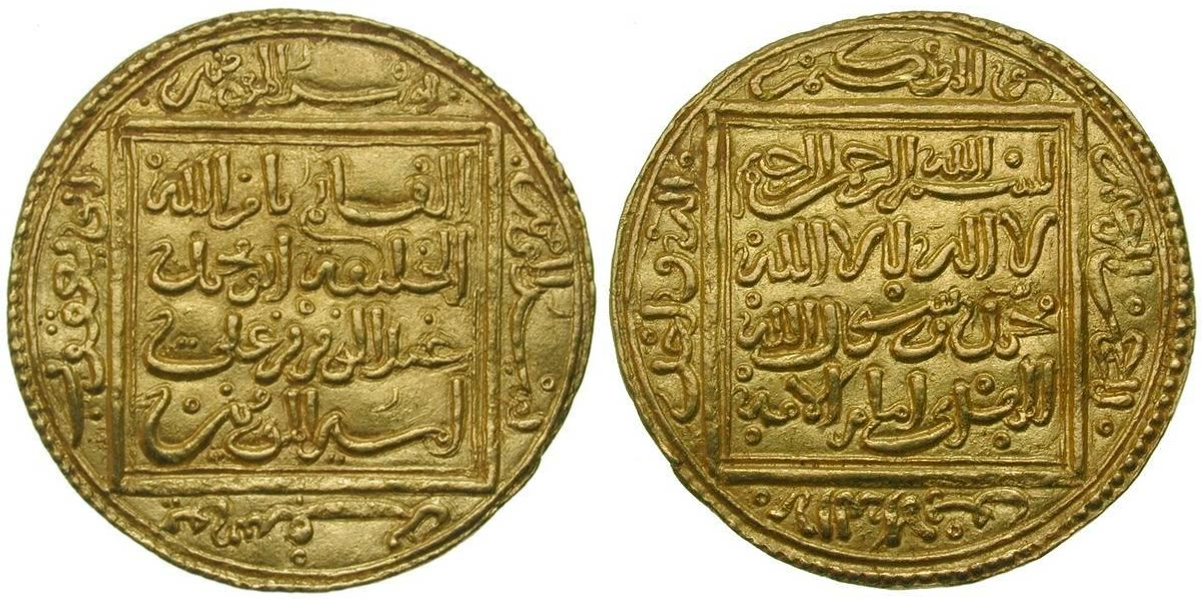
- Coin minted during the reign of Abu Yaqub Yusuf

Ruler of the Almohad Caliphate
- Reign: 1163–1184
- Predecessor: Abd al-Mu'min ibn Ali
- Successor: Abu Yusuf Yaqub al-Mansur
- Born: 1135; Tinmel
- Died: 1184 (aged 48–49) near Évora
- Burial: Tinmel
- Issue: Abu Yusuf Yaqub al-Mansur; Zaynab bent Youssef
Names
- Abu Yaqub Yusuf ibn Abd al-Mu'min
- Dynasty: Almohad
- Father: Abd al-Mu'min ibn Ali
- Mother: Safiyya bint Abi Imran
- Religion: Islam

Abu Ya‘qub Yusuf or Yusuf I (Arabic: أبو يعقوب يوسف Abū Ya‘qūb Yūsuf; 1135 – 14 October 1184) was the second Almohad Amir or caliph. He reigned from 1163 until 1184 in Marrakesh. He was responsible for the construction of the Giralda in Seville, which was part of a new grand mosque. He was a keen student of philosophy and patron of Averroes.

== Life ==
Yusuf was the son of Abd al-Mu'min, the first caliph of the Almohad dynasty. His mother was Safiyya bint Abi Imran, a Masmuda woman from Tinmel, the daughter of Abu Imran Musa ibn Sulayman al-Kafif, a companion of Ibn Tumart.

Yusuf supported the Almohad doctrine and, like his predecessors, favored the literalist Zahiri school of Islamic jurisprudence and was a religious scholar in his own right. He was said to have memorized by heart Sahih Bukhari and Sahih Muslim, two collections of Muhammad's statements considered canonical in Sunni Islam and was a patron of the theologians of his era. Respected men of letters such as Ibn Rushd and Ibn Tufayl were entertained at his court. Yusuf favored the Córdoban polymath ibn Maḍāʾ as his chief judge; during the Almohad reforms, the two oversaw the banning of any religious material written by non-Zahiris. Yusuf's son al-Mansur would eventually take the reforms even further, actually burning non-Zahiri books instead of merely banning them.

He continued the conquest of al-Andalus, initiated by his father, into Valencia and Catalonia. In 1171, he established himself in Seville. He ordered the construction of numerous buildings, such as the Alcázar of Seville, the Buhaira Gardens, and the fortress of Alcalá de Guadaíra. The arrival of the zealous Almohads heralded the end of the Golden age of Jewish culture in Spain.

Abu Ya'qub Yusuf was wounded at the Siege of Santarém (1184), in which he died on the road to Seville, near Évora. His body was sent from Seville to Tinmel where he was buried.

| Preceded by Abd al-Mu'min | Almohad dynasty 1163–1184 | Succeeded by Abu Yusuf Ya'qub al-Mansur |
