= Mellala Mosque =

Mosque in Béjaia, Algeria

- مسجد ملالة
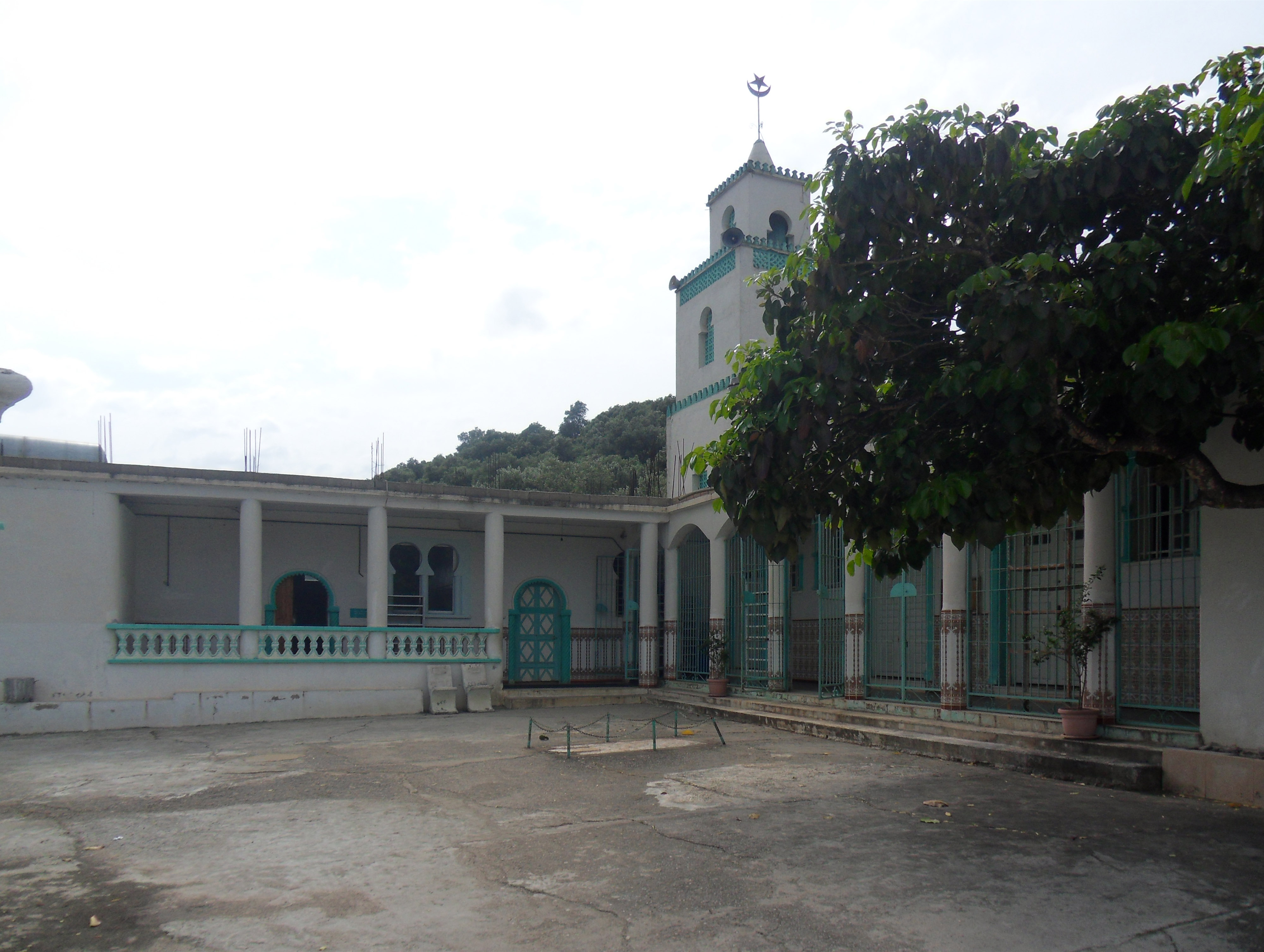
- The minaret and sahn in 2012

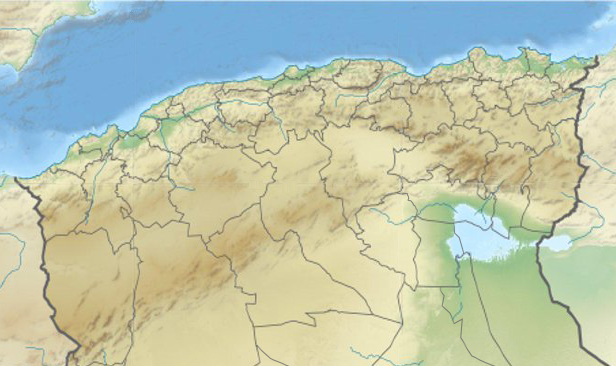
- Location of the mosque in north Algeria

Religion
- Affiliation: Islam
- Ecclesiastical or organisational status: Mosque
- Status: Active

Location
- Location: Béjaia
- Country: Algeria
- Interactive map of Mellala Mosque
- Coordinates: 36°42′49″N 5°01′14″E

Architecture
- Type: Islamic architecture
- Style: Hammadid; Moorish
- Founder: Ibn Tumart
- Completed: c. 1120 CE (first structure); 1960s (current structure)
- Minaret: 1

The Mellala Mosque (Arabic: مسجد ملالة, romanized: Masjid Malala), also known as the Ibn Tomart Mosque (Arabic: مسجد ابن تومرت, romanized: Masjid Ibn Tumert), is a mosque located in Béjaia, Algeria. Its construction dates from the 12th century, during the rule of the Hammadid Emirate; and was replaced with a new structure in the 1960s.

== Background ==
The mosque dates from the Hammadid era, in c. 1120 CE, when Abd al-Mu'min, coming from Nedroma to Béjaïa in search of knowledge, met Ibn Tumart. He had taken refuge in the village of Malala and preached to the people in this mosque. The two men formed an alliance and agreed to launch the Almohad call, which led to the emergence of the Almohad Empire. Mohammed al-Baydhaq mentioned in his account regarding the Malala Mosque:

The sons of Al-Aziz, when they saw Ibn Tomart in Malala, said to him: O jurist, we want to build a mosque for you here.' He said to them, may Allah be pleased with him: 'If you wish, then build a mosque for him here,' and students began to come to it from everywhere to pray.

== Architecture ==
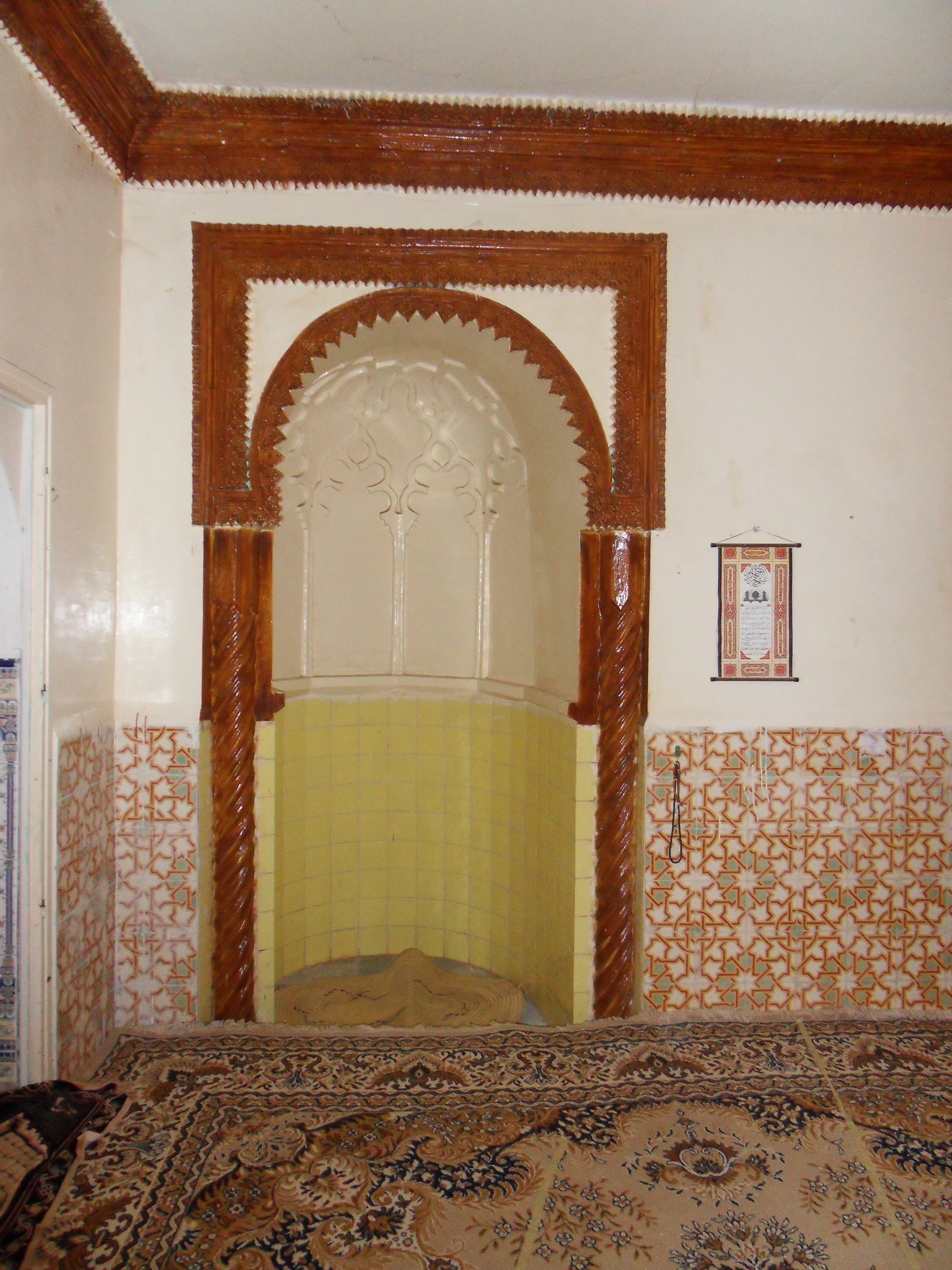
The original mihrab of the mosque, the oldest remaining part of the building

All that remains of the old Hammadid mosque are traces of its mihrab in the form of a semicircular arch, with its decorations believed to be modern. However, the motifs situated above it are original, taking the form of interlocking ornamentation reminiscent of those found in Almohad architectural structures, particularly seen in the minarets of Hassan Mosque in Rabat, Kutubiyya Mosque in Marrakesh, and Giralda in Seville. The construction of the mihrab is visibly raised from the wall's surface and made of regular bricks. Interestingly, the mosque is not oriented towards the qibla but rather towards the south, outside the qibla wall. In front of the mihrab lies a tomb, believed to be that of Sidi Yahya Abi Zakaria, although sources like Ouratilani and Alghobrini suggest he was buried in Béjaïa, hence locals refer to him as Sidi Yahya Abi Qubrayn.

In the 1960s, the old mosque was demolished and replaced by a new one, nearly identical in size to the original, known as the Ibn Tumart Mosque. It is considered one of the oldest mosques in Béjaïa, alongside the Casbah Mosque, and the Abu Zakariyya Mosque.

== Ibn Tumart ==
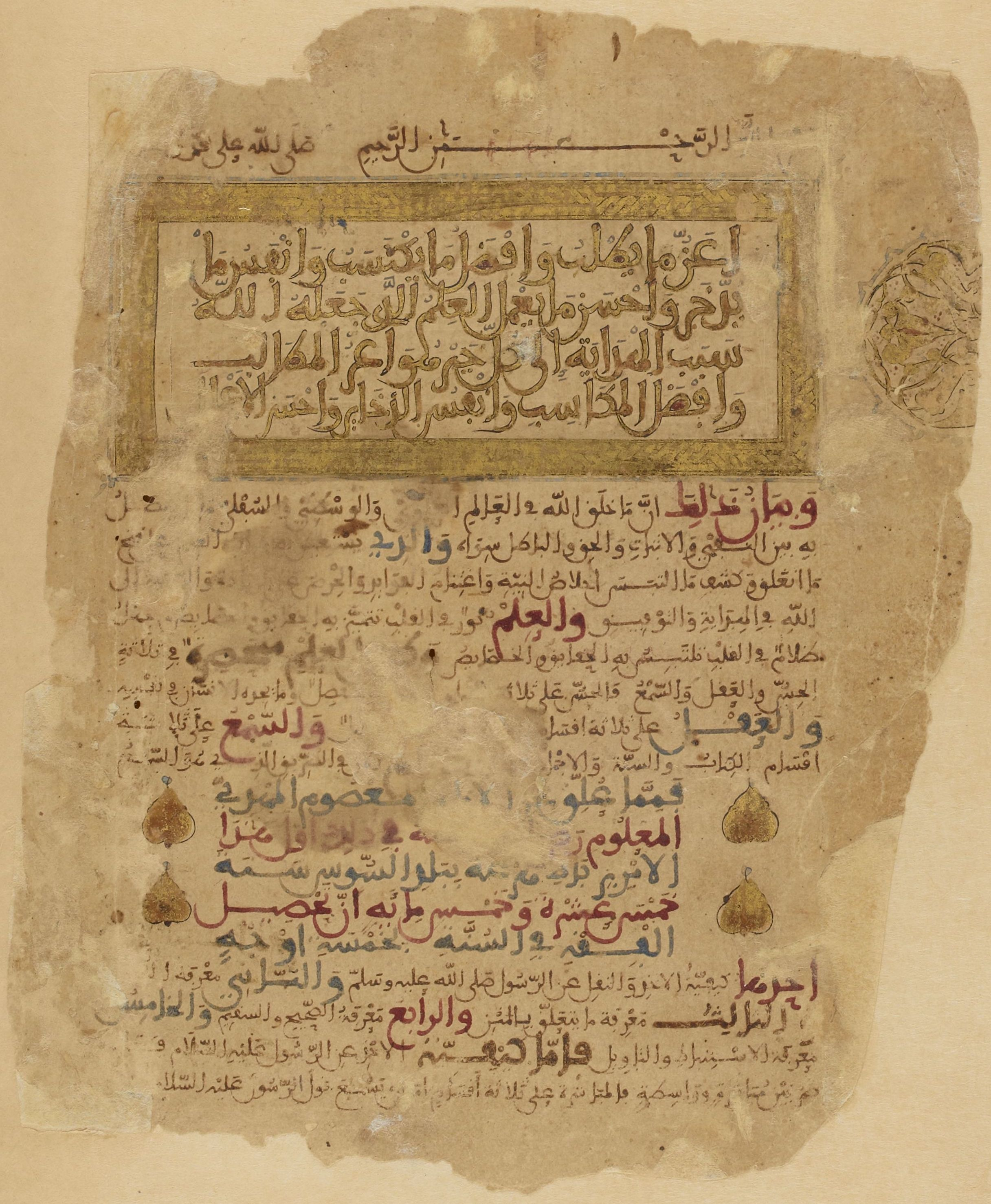
A manuscript from 1183 containing Aʿazzu Mā Yuṭlab, a compilation of the teachings of Ibn Tumart

Upon the construction of the mosque, many students were attracted from all over. After the lesson in his mosque, Tumart would sit at the crossroads under the carob tree, engaging in remembrance of Allah] One day, upon entering Béjaïa and reaching Bab Al-Bahr, he poured wine on the ground, which was being sold there. Ubayd Sab, the son of emir Al-Aziz beat him, after this incident Tumart returned to his mosque at mellala. Al-Baydhaq later spoke about the meeting between Tumart and Abd al-Mu'min. Most other sources confirm that the meeting took place in Malala. Tumart then traveled to the far west accompanied by Abd al-Mu'min. According to Ibn Al-Qattan's account, Ibn Tumart encountered in Béjaïa some young men dressed as women, impressing those corrupt in morals, so he put an end to this reprehensible behavior. On one occasion, men were seen mingling with women and children, dressed in the finest clothes, with adorned eyes. He lashed out at them, leading to quarrels and women being stripped of their jewelry. When the Hammadid Emir Al-Aziz learned of this, he ordered some Ulamas to converse with the jurist "Al-Sous" (a nickname given to Ibn Tumart), who was involved in the incident. They gathered at one of their houses, brought food and drinks, and did invite one of their colleagues to bring the imam from the Mellala mosque that he frequented. He refused their invitation. They then sent the scribe Omar bin Filful, who succeeded in persuading him with kindness and attempted to convince him to stop from denouncing the sins. The debate ended with the Imam prevailing over his opponents in the city. There are other noteworthy testimonies; Al Marakushi confirmed that the people of Béjaïa accepted Tumart's observations, but the Hammadid Emir expelled him; and Al-Zarqashi narrated that Tumart moved to Béjaïa, where the governor was Al-Aziz ibn Al-Mansur ibn Al-Nasir ibn Alnas ibn Hamad Al-Sanhaji and sat on a rock by the roadside near the lands of Malala, which is still known to this day (meaning during the lifetime of the author).

== See also ==
- Islam in Algeria
- List of mosques in Algeria
