= Igiliz =

Archeological site, birthplace of Ibn Tumart

- إكَيليز (Arabic); ⵉⴳⵉⵍⵉⵣ (Tachelhit)
- Igiliz-n-Warghan
- Location within Morocco
- 30.3993°N 8.3658°W
- Type: Settlement
- Associated with: Arghen
- Location: Igiliz, Toughmart, Morocco
- Region: Taroudant Province, Souss-Massa

History
- Built: c. 1120
- Abandoned: 18th century

Site notes
- Elevation: 1,354 m (4,442 ft)
- Architectural style: Berber
- Excavation dates: 2008-2000
- Discovered: 2006
- Public access: Allowed for visitors and tourists
- Website: visitagadir.com/sit/site-archeologique-digiliz/

Designations
- Designation: Moroccan national historic monument

Igiliz (Arabic: إكَيليز; Tachelhit: ⵉⴳⵉⵍⵉⵣ) is a medieval village located in the rural commune of Toughmart on the edge of the Sous valley in the Anti-Atlas mountains of Morocco. It is most known for being the birthplace of Ibn Tumart, founder of the Almohad caliphate. The village was known as place of pilgrimage by Ibn Tumart's followers during Almohad rule.

As the Almohad caliphate collapsed, the village's location had become lost over time and was believed to be fictional until its discovery in 2006 with archeological searches starting in 2008. In 2022, the Igiliz archeological site was listed as a national historic monument. In 2023, the site was opened to visitors and tourists.

== Etymology ==
Igiliz is a toponym in Berber that can be translated to "mountain peak" or "isolated mountain". The village's full name in Berber, Igiliz-n-Warghen (Tachelhit: ⵉⴳⵉⵍⵉⵣ ⵏ ⵡⴰⵔⵖⴰⵏ, French: Igiliz-des-Hargha), refers to the native Arghen tribe within the Masmuda tribal confederation.

== Architecture ==
Igiliz is fortified by two defense walls. There is a residential complex, the Qasba, centered around two courtyards. There is the presence of two places of worship, including a large mosque. Artificial caves, former quarries, were used as places of spiritual retreat and pilgrimage.

== History and lifestyle ==
The village was built in the 11th century by the Arghen, Ibn Tumart's tribe, as a ribāṭ. Ceramics jars, lamps, plates, braziers, pans, marmites, couscoussiers, flowerpots and a bread oven were found in the archeological site. It is theorized that the community in Igiliz held a market every Friday, to correspond with the Friday sermon, to exchange goods and news, settle disputes, negotiate marriage, and maintain contact with the larger Masmuda confederation.

In 1120, Ibn Tumart exiled himself in a cave in his birthplace of Igiliz fearing Almoravid leadership, he proclaimed himself as the Mahdi in the village a year later. Following a military success in 1123, Ibn Tumart moved to the village of Tinmal where he died in 1130.

In 1141, Igiliz served as a military base for the Almohads serving the anti-Atlas and the Souss valley. In 1157, five years after the Almohad conquest of Marrakesh, caliph Abd al-Mu'min took a pilgrimage to the ribāṭ of Igiliz to pay respect to Ibn Tumart and the Arghen tribe, where he ordered the preservation of Ibn Tumart's cave. During the conquest, Sufi saint Abu al-Abbas as-Sabti moved from Ceuta to Igiliz. His son and successor, Abu Yaqub Yusuf, had done the same pilgrimage in 1170. By the 13th century, the village had two hermitages dedicated for pilgrims.

Despite Igiliz's status as a site of pilgrimage, the location of the village started to become omitted from written literature and forgotten in favor of Tinmal, Igiliz had become completely deserted by the 18th century. The village's legacy persisted as a site of asceticism where the native Arghen held a ritual luncheon every year in memory of Ibn Tumart.

The village's exact location had become lost over time and was believed to be fictional. In 1924, French historians Henri Basset and Henri Terrasse assumed the village to be in Gueliz district of Marrakesh but offered no reasonable evidence to substanciate their claim. In 2005, American historian Allen Fromherz disproved the claim and theorized Igiliz to be located in the village of Igli, near Taroudant within the Sous valley, coroberating his claim with oral tradition.

In 2006, historians Jean-Pierre van Staëvel and Abdallah Fili disproved Fromherz's theory as a confusion between toponyms, with Igili contradicting with historical descriptions of Igiliz as a fortified site in the anti-Atlas. After a search for Igiliz at the Arghen's historical territory, the delegation located a ribāṭ believed to have been Igiliz. In 2008, archeological searches began which confirmed the location to be Igiliz. In 2023, the Souss-Massa regional tourism council opened the site for visitors and tourists.
