= Almohad doctrine =

Ideology of the Almohads

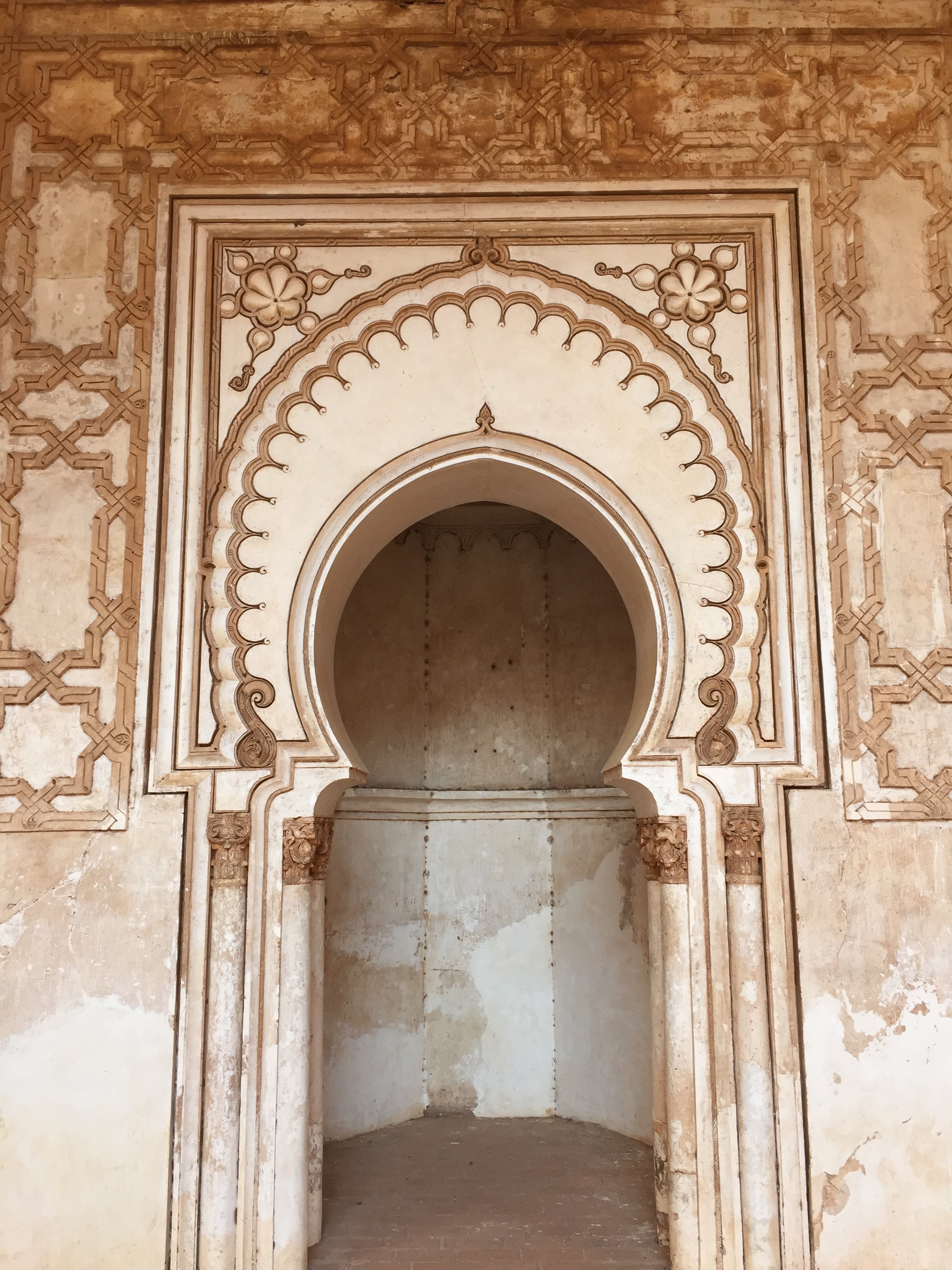
Mihrab of the Tinmal Mosque, built in the mid-12th century at the site of the base from which the Almohads launched their attacks on the Almoravids.

Almohad doctrine (Arabic: الدَّعوَة المُوَحِّدِيَّة) or Almohadism was the ideology underpinning the Almohad movement, founded by Ibn Tumart, which created the Almohad Empire during the 12th to 13th centuries. Fundamental to Almohadism was Ibn Tumart's radical interpretation of tawḥid—"unity" or "oneness"—from which the Almohads get their name: al-muwaḥḥidūn (المُوَحِّدون).

The literalist ideology and policies of the Almohads involved a series of attempted radical changes to Islamic religious and social doctrine under their rule. These policies affected large parts of the Maghreb and altered the existing religious climate in al-Andalus (Islamic Spain and Portugal) for many decades. They marked a major departure from the social policies and attitudes of earlier Muslim governments in the region, including the preceding Almoravid dynasty which had followed its own reformist agenda. The teachings of Ibn Tumart were compiled in the book Aʿazzu Mā Yuṭlab.

On the grounds that Ibn Tumart proclaimed himself to be the mahdi, or renewer—not only of Islam, but of "the pure monotheistic message" common to Islam, Christianity, and Judaism—the Almohads rejected the status of dhimma completely. As the Almohad Caliphate expanded, Abd al-Mu'min ordered Jews and Christians in conquered territories—as well as the Kharijites, Maliki Sunnis, and Shi‘is of the Muslim majority—to accept Almohad Islam, depart, or risk death. The Almohad conquest of al-Andalus led to the emigration of Andalusi Christians from southern Iberia to the Christian north, especially to the Tagus valley and Toledo. Andalusi Jews, an urban and visible population, faced intense, often violent Almohad pressure to convert, and many, instead of leaving life as a minority in one place to hazard life as a minority in another, converted at least superficially, though many of these converts continued to face discrimination. After the 13th century collapse of the Almohad Caliphate, an Arabized Jewish population reappeared in the Maghreb, but a Christian one did not.

== Origins ==
=== Religious climate before Almohads ===
During its golden age, al-Andalus (in present-day Spain and Portugal) was open to a good deal of religious tolerance. For the most part, the Almoravids let other People of the Book, members of other religions that held the Hebrew Bible as a holy text, practice their religion freely. The Almoravids were more fundamentalist than previous Muslim rulers of Spain, championing a strict adherence to the Maliki school of Islamic law.

The golden age for Jews in the Iberian Peninsula is considered to be under the relatively tolerant rule of the Umayyad Caliphate in al-Andalus. It was generally a time when Jews were free to conduct business and practice their religion under the limitations of Dhimmi status.

=== Rise to power ===
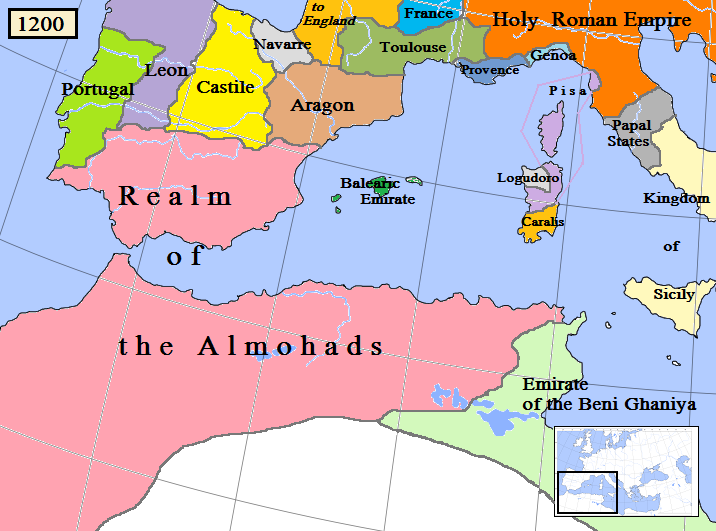
Almohad dynasty and surrounding states, c. 1200.

The Almohads were led by Ibn Tumart, regarded by historians as a fundamentalist who was convinced that it was his destiny to reform Islam. Ibn Tumart claimed to be the mahdi, a title which elevated him to something similar to a messiah or leader of the redemption of a righteous Islamic order. He was an intelligent and charismatic man; he claimed to be a direct descendant of Muhammad. He had studied in Alexandria, Córdoba, Mecca, and Baghdad, and his charismatic preaching earned him a devoted group of followers.

He presented a different religious view that caused outright hostility on the Iberian Peninsula after the Almohads crossed the Strait of Gibraltar in 1146. Their rule quickly spread across the Muslim territories of the peninsula (known as al-Andalus). At their height, they were one of the most powerful forces in the western Mediterranean. They were a determined military and economic force, defeating Christian forces primarily composed of Castilians at the Battle of Alarcos.

Ibn Tumart himself died in 1130, well before the Almohads' main military successes, and had no spiritual successor. However, the political leadership of his movement passed on to Abd al-Mu'min, who effectively founded the ruling Almohad dynasty. He and his successors had very different personalities from Ibn Tumart but pursued his reforms, culminating in a particularly aggressive push by Ya'qub al-Mansur (who arguably ruled at the apogee of Almohad power in the late 12th century).

== Religious doctrine and ideology ==
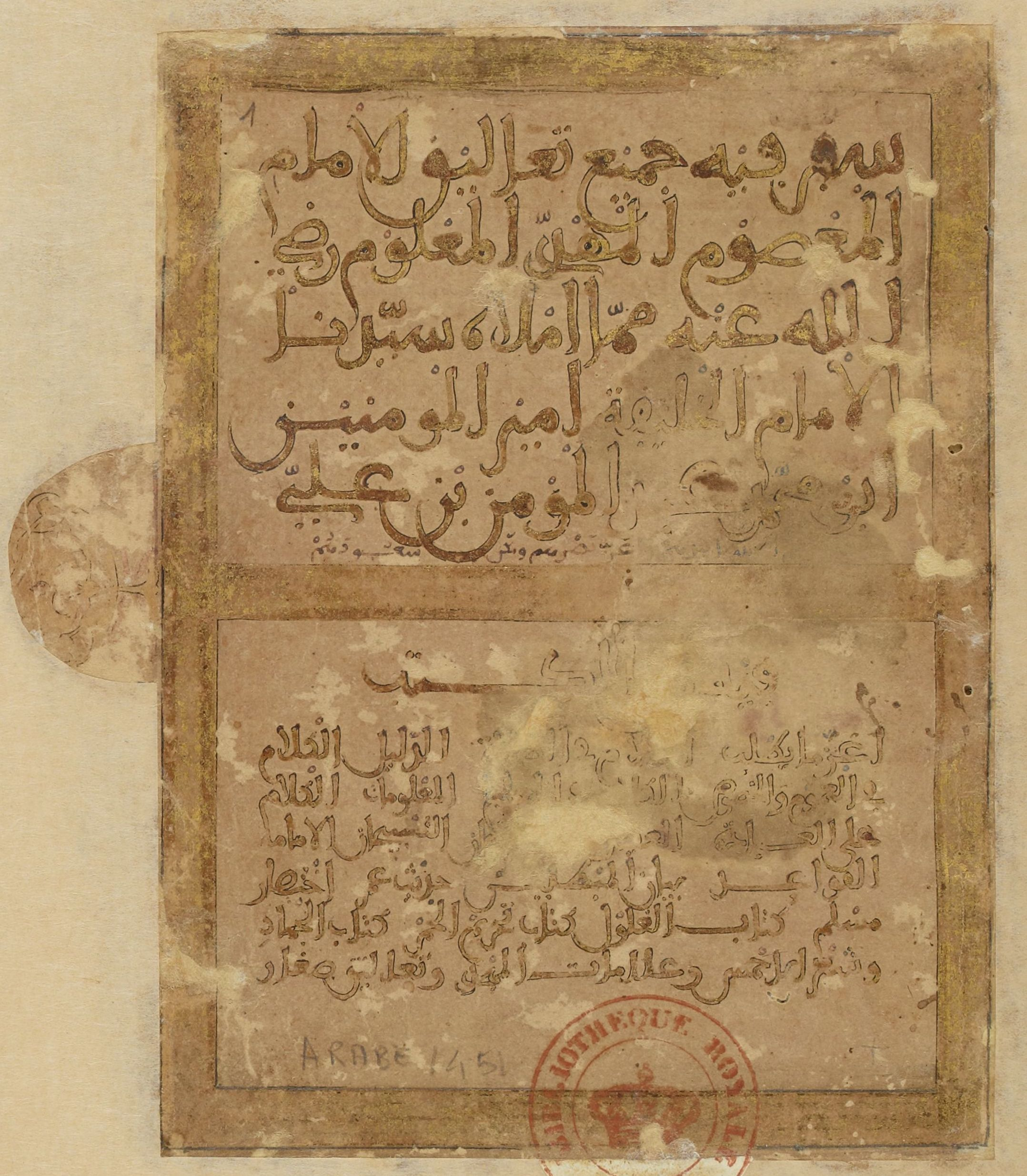
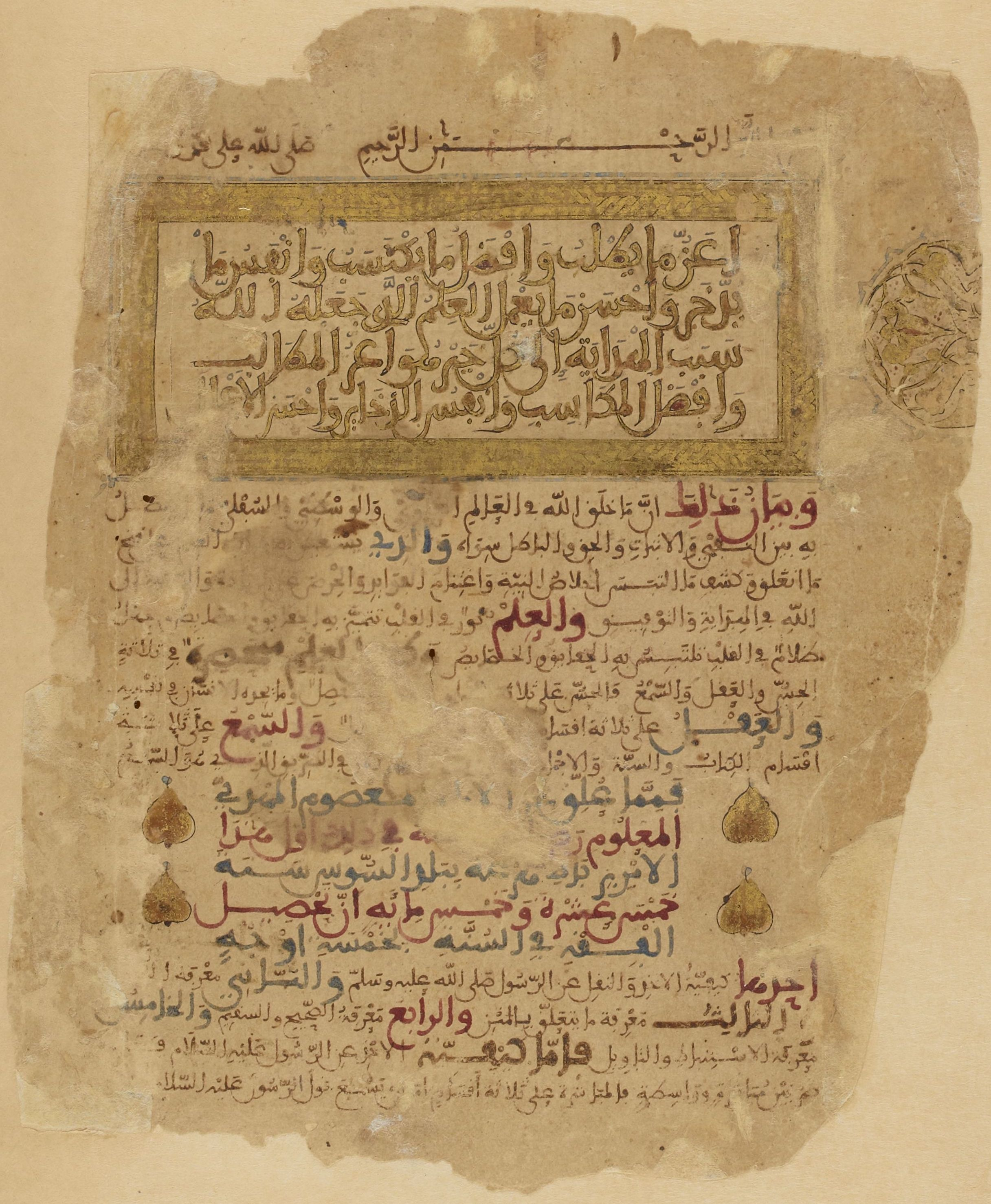
An 1183 manuscript of Aʿazzu Mā Yuṭlab, which contained the teachings of Ibn Tumart, the fundamental ideas of Almohadism.

=== Tawḥīd ===
The Almohad ideology preached by Ibn Tumart is described by Amira Bennison as a "sophisticated hybrid form of Islam that wove together strands from Hadith science, Zahiri and Shafi'i fiqh, Ghazalian social actions (hisbah), and spiritual engagement with Shi'i notions of the imam and mahdi." This contrasted with the highly orthodox or traditionalist Maliki school (maddhab) of Sunni Islam which predominated in the region up to that point. Central to his philosophy, Ibn Tumart preached a fundamentalist or radical version of tawhid—referring to a strict monotheism or "oneness of God". This notion gave the movement its name: al-Muwaḥḥidūn (Arabic: المُوَحِّدون), meaning roughly "those who advocate tawhid", which was adapted into "Almohads" in European writings. Ibn Tumart saw his movement as a revolutionary reform movement much as early Islam saw itself relative to the Christianity and Judaism preceding it, with himself as its mahdi and leader. Whereas the Almoravids before him saw themselves as emirs nominally acknowledging the Abbasids as caliphs, the Almohads established their own rival caliphate, rejecting Abbasid moral authority as well as the local Maliki establishment.

=== Law ===
The Almohad judicial system has been described as looking to the letter of the law rather than the deeper intended purpose of the law. They primarily followed the Zahiri school of fiqh within Sunni Islam; under the reign of Abu Yaqub Yusuf, chief judge Ibn Maḍāʾ oversaw the banning of any religious material written by non-Zahirites. Abu Yaqub's son Abu Yusuf went even further, actually burning non-Zahirite religious works instead of merely banning them. They trained new judges, who were given schooling in both the religious and military arts.

=== Theology ===
In terms of Islamic theology, the Almohads were Ash'arites, their Zahirite-Ash'arism giving rise to a complicated blend of literalist jurisprudence and esoteric dogmatics. Some authors occasionally describe Almohads as heavily influenced by the Muʿtazila. Scholar Madeline Fletcher argues that while one of Ibn Tumart's original teachings, the murshida (a collection of sayings memorized by his followers), holds positions on the attributes of God that might be construed as moderately Mu'tazilite (and which were criticized as such by Ibn Taymiyyah), identifying him with Mu'tazilites would be an exaggeration. She points out that another of his main texts, the 'aqida (which was likely edited by others after him), demonstrates a much clearer Ash'arite position on a number of issues.

Nonetheless, the Almohads, particularly from the reign of Caliph Abu Yusuf Yaqub al-Mansur onward, embraced the use of logical reasoning as a method of validating the more central Almohad concept of tawhid. This effectively provided a religious justification for philosophy and for a rationalist intellectualism in Almohad religious thought. Al-Mansur's father, Abu Yaqub Yusuf, had also shown some favour towards philosophy and kept the philosopher Ibn Tufail as his confidant. Ibn Tufayl, in turn, introduced Ibn Rushd (Averroes) to the Almohad court, to whom Al-Mansur gave patronage and protection. Although Ibn Rushd (who was also an Islamic judge) saw rationalism and philosophy as complementary to religion and revelation, his views failed to convince the traditional Maliki ulama, with whom the Almohads were already at odds. After the decline of Almohadism, Maliki Sunnism ultimately became the dominant official religious doctrine of the region. By contrast, the teachings of Ibn Rushd and other philosophers like him were far more influential for Jewish philosophers—including Maimonides, his contemporary—and Christian Latin scholars—like Thomas Aquinas—who later promoted his commentaries on Aristotle.

== Dissemination ==
=== Arabic-Berber bilingualism ===
The khuṭbas (from خطبة, the Friday sermon) of the Almohads were essential to the dissemination of Almohad doctrine and ideology. One of the most important Almohad innovations in the khuṭba was the imposition of Berber language—or al-lisān al-gharbī (اللسان الغربي 'the western tongue') as the Andalusi historian Ibn Ṣāḥib aṣ-Ṣalāt described it—as an official liturgical language; bilingualism became a feature of Almohad preaching in both al-Andalus and the Maghreb. Ibn Tumart was described by an anonymous chronicler of the Almohads as "afṣaḥ an-nāss (the most eloquent of the people) in Arabic and Berber." Under the Almohads, the khaṭīb, or sermon-giver, of al-Qarawiyyīn Mosque in Fes, Mahdī b. ‘Īsā, was replaced by Abū l-Ḥasan b. ‘Aṭiyya because the latter was fluent in Berber.

=== Almohad creed ===
It was obligatory in the khuṭba to repeat the "Almohad creed," with blessings upon the Mahdi Ibn Tumart and affirmation of his claimed hidāya and prophetic lineage. Under Abd al-Mu'min, Ibn Tumart's sermon became institutionalized as what contemporary sources called khuṭbat al-Muwaḥḥidīn (خطبة الموحدين, 'khuṭba of the Almohads') or al-khuṭba l-ma‘lūma (الخطبة المعلومة, 'the well-known sermon'). This khuṭba was delivered by every Almohad khaṭīb, and also on the ḥarakas of the sultan and his courts between Marrakesh and Seville.

== Treatment of non-Muslims ==
At their peak in the 1170s, the Almohads had firm control over most of Islamic Spain and were not threatened by the Christian forces to the north. Once the Almohads took control of southern Spain and Portugal, they introduced a number of very strict religious laws. Even before they took complete control in the 1170s, they had begun removing non-Muslims from positions of power.

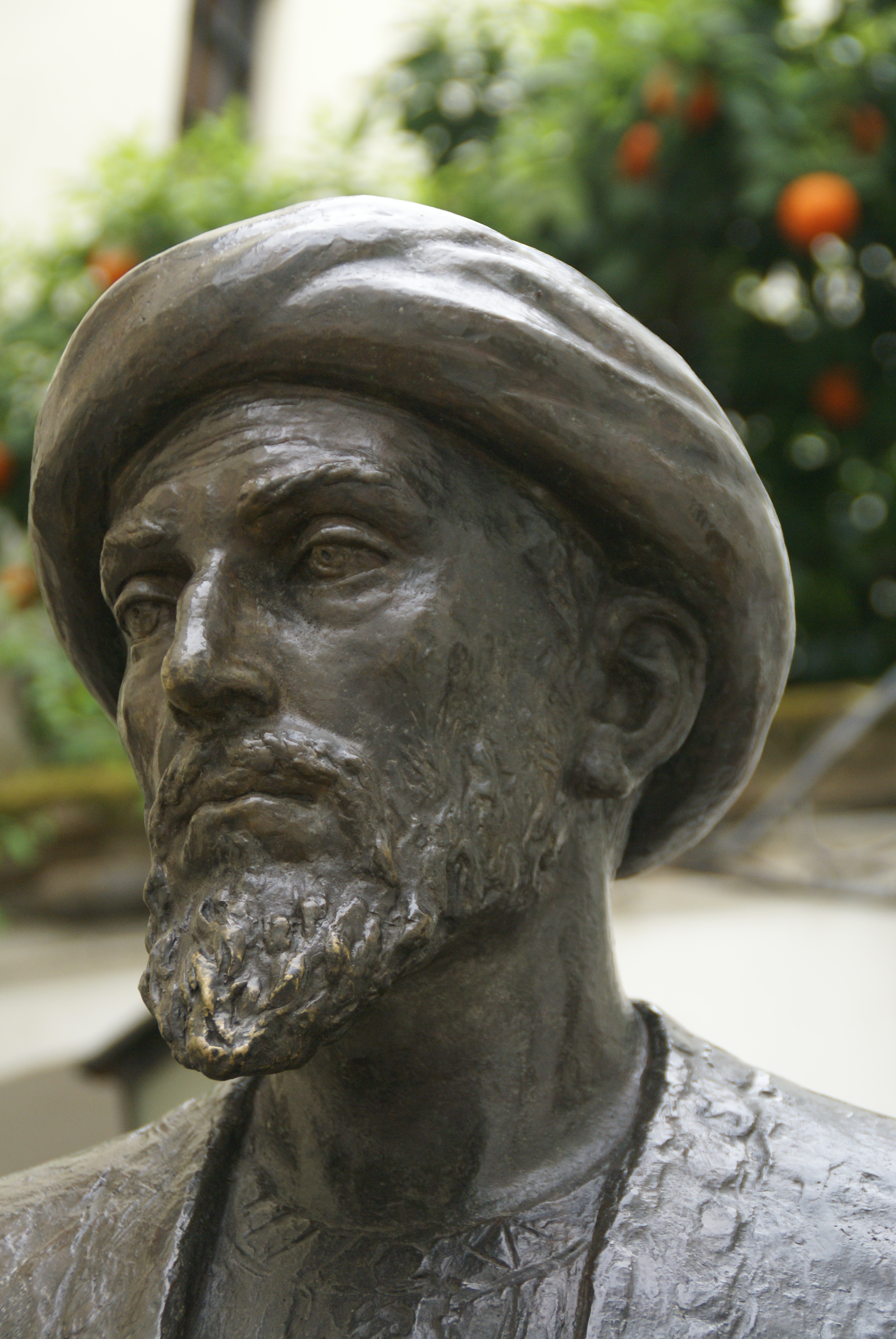
Amira Bennison argues that Maimonides and his family were converted to Islam for a time under the Almohads before moving to Egypt.

Jews and Christians were denied freedom of religion, with many sources relating that the Almohads rejected the very concept of dhimmi (the official protected but subordinate status of Jews and Christians under Islamic rule) and insisted that all people should accept Ibn Tumart as mahdi. During his siege against the Normans in Mahdia, Abd al-Mu'min infamously declared that Christians and Jews must choose between conversion or death. Likewise, the Almohads officially regarded all non-Almohads, including non-Almohad Muslims, as false monotheists and in multiple cases massacred or punished the entire population of a town, both Muslim and non-Muslim, for defying them. Generally, however, the enforcement of this ideological position varied greatly from place to place and appears to have been especially tied to whether or not local communities resisted the Almohad armies as they advanced. However, as the Almohads were on a self-declared jihad, they were willing to use brutal techniques to back up their holy war. In some cases, the threats of violence were carried out locally as a warning to others, even if the authorities did not have the ability actually to follow through on a larger scale. Native Christians in al-Andalus who were living under Muslim rule up until this point had the option to escape to Christian-controlled lands to the north, and many did so. Alfonso VII of Leon and Castile also encouraged them to flee by offering them lands if they migrated to his territory. Jews, however, were particularly vulnerable as they faced an uncertain minority status in both Christian and Muslim territories, as well as because they lived mainly in urban areas where they were especially visible to authorities. Many were killed in the course of Almohad invasions or repressions.

This pressure to convert resulted in many conversions under duress, which were insincere, with many Christians and Jews ostensibly converting in order to escape violence while preserving their livelihoods. Even the famous Jewish philosopher Maimonides was reported to have officially converted to Islam under Almohad rule when he moved from Cordoba to Fes, before finally leaving for Egypt where he was able to live openly as a Jew again. Half-hearted oaths were certainly not looked to as ideal and brought a lot of problems for the population of al-Andalus, much as it did during the forced conversion of Muslims and Jews in Spain and Portugal a few centuries later. The Almohads recognized that many of the conversions by Jews were not particularly sincere, which certainly did not help to promote social and religious unity. They responded to this by imposing severe regulations on the business of former Jews. Abu Yusuf Yaqub al-Mansur set up a strict dress code for Jews living within Almohad territory: Jews had to wear dark blue or black, the traditional colors of mourning in Islam, which further entrenched discrimination.

== Decline ==
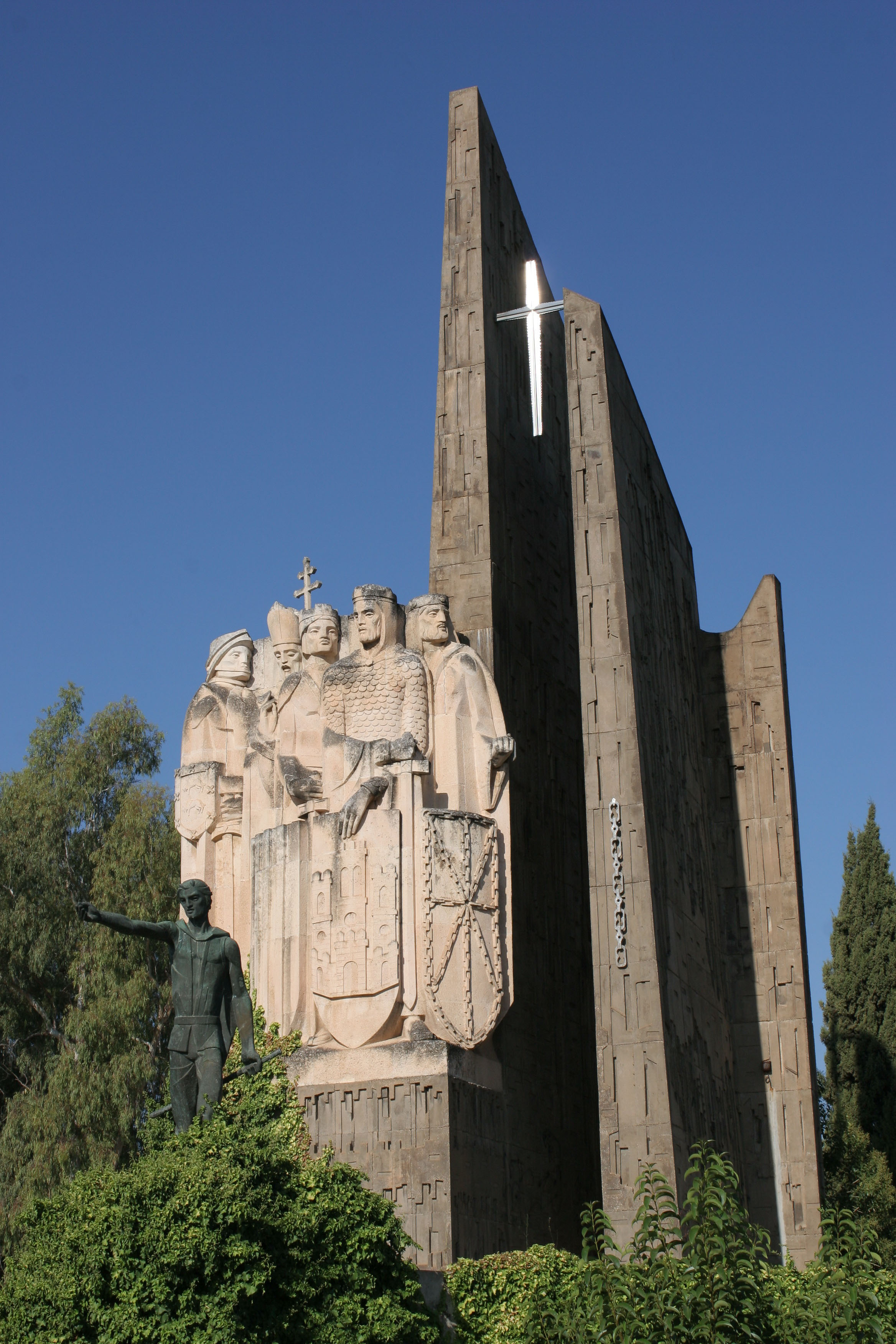
The monument constructed on the site of the Battle of Las Navas de Tolosa

In al-Andalus the Almohad caliphate was decisively defeated by the combined Christian forces of Portugal, Castile, and Aragon at the Battle of Las Navas de Tolosa, in 1212. The battle is recognized as one of the most important events in the reconquista movement in Spain. Not only was it a decisive defeat of the Muslim forces, it was also one of the first times the fractured Christian kingdoms of the north came together for the common goal of reclaiming the peninsula.

Following 1212 the Almohad Caliphate's power declined and the revolutionary religious dogmatism of Ibn Tumart began to fade as later Almohad dynastic rulers were more preoccupied with the practicalities of maintaining the empire over a wide region whose population largely did not subscribe to Almohadism. This culminated in 1229 when Caliph al-Ma'mun publicly repudiated Ibn Tumart's status as mahdi. This declaration may have been an attempt to appease the Muslim population of al-Andalus, but it also allowed for one Almohad faction, the Hafsids, to disavow his leadership and declare the eastern part of the empire in Ifriqiya (Tunisia) to be independent, thus founding the Hafsid state.

By 1270, the Almohads were no longer a force of any significance on the Iberian Peninsula or Morocco. After their fall, the fundamentalist religious doctrine that they supported was relaxed once again. Some scholars consider that Ibn Tumart's overall ideological mission ultimately failed, but that, like the Almoravids, his movement nonetheless played a role in the history of Islamization in the region. One holdover for Jews was a law that stated that people who converted to Islam would be put to death if they reconverted.

The Hafsids of Tunisia, in turn, officially declared themselves the true "Almohads" after their independence from Marrakesh but this identity and ideology lessened in importance over time. The early Hafsid leadership mainly attempted to keep the Almohads as a political elite more than a religious elite in a region that was otherwise predominantly Maliki Sunni in orientation. Eventually, the Almohads were merely one among multiple factions competing for power in their state. After 1311, when Sultan al-Lihyani took power with Aragonese help, Ibn Tumart's name was dropped from the khutba (the main community sermon on Fridays), effectively signaling the end of public support for Almohad doctrine. Over the 14th century the Maliki ulama (scholars) increasingly occupied positions in the state and were the de facto religious authorities.
