= Al-Zarkashi =

14th-century Islamic scholar

Personal life
- Born: 1344 CE/745 AH Egypt
- Died: 1392 CE/794 AH
- Era: Mamluk
- Region: Middle East
- Main interest(s): Hadith studies, Islamic jurisprudence.
- Occupation: Historiographer, bibliographer, scholar, jurist.

Religious life
- Religion: Islam
- Denomination: Sunni
- Jurisprudence: Shafi'i
- Creed: Ash'ari
- Arabic name
- Personal (Ism): Muhammad
- Patronymic (Nasab): Ibn Abdullah ibn Bahādir
- Teknonymic (Kunya): Abū 'Abdullāh
- Toponymic (Nisba): az-Zarkashī

Abū Abdullāh Badr ad-Dīn Mohammed bin Abdullah bin Bahādir az-Zarkashī (1344–1392/ 745–794 AH), better known as Az-Zarkashī, was a fourteenth-century Islamic scholar. He primarily resided in Mamluk-era Cairo. He specialized in the fields of law, hadith, history, and Shafi'i legal jurisprudence (fiqh). He left behind thirty compendia, but the majority of these are lost to modern researchers, and only the titles are known. One of his most famous works that has survived is al-Burhān fī 'Ulūm al-Qur'ān, a manual of the Qur'anic sciences.

== Teachers ==
Az-Zarkashī studied hadīth (one of various reports describing the words, actions, or habits of the prophet Muhammad) in Damascus with Imād al-Dīn Ibn Kathir (d. 1373), fiqh and usūl in Aleppo with Shihāb ud-Dīn Al-Adhra`I (d. 1381), and Quran and fiqh in Cairo with the head of the Shafi’i school in Cairo at the time, Jamal al-Din al-Isnawi.

== Disciples ==
His notable students included Shamsuddīn al-Barmaid (d. 830 AH) and Najmuddin bin Haji ad-Dimashqi (d. 831 AH).

== Works ==
- Al-bahr al-muhīt fī usūl al-fiqh (البحر المحيط، في أصول الفقه)
- Salāsil adh-dhahab fī usūl al-fiqh (سلاسل الذهب في أصول الفقه)
- Al-burhān fī ʿulūm al-Qur'ān (البرهان في علوم القرآن)
- Iʿlam as-sājid bi-ahkām al-masājid (إعلام الساجد بأحكام المساجد)
- "The Corrective: ʿĀ’isha’s Rectification of the Companions" Al-Ijāba limā istadrakatahu ‘Ā’isha ‘alā as-Sahāba ( الإجابة لما استدركته عائشة على الصحابة)
- At-tadhkirah fī al-ahādīth al-mushtaharah (التذكرة في الأحاديث المشتهرة)
- Risāla fī maʿnī kalimat fī at-Tawhid (lā ilaha illallah) (رسالة في معني كلمة التوحيد (لا إله إلا الله
- Al-manthūr fī al-qawāʿid fiqh ash-Shāfiʿiyyah (المنثور في القواعد فقه شافعي): is considered by many scholars to be among the foremost compendiums of legal principles in the Shāfi'i fiqh. The text includes over 100 principles that are listed alphabetically.
- Takhrīj ahādīth ash-sharh al-kabīr li ar-Rāfiʿī (تخريج أحاديث الشرح الكبير للرافعي)
- Al-ghurar as-sāfir fīmā yahtāju ilaihi al-musāfir (الغرر السافر فيما يحتاج إليه المسافر)
- Zahr al-ʿarīsh fī taḥrīm al-ḥashīsh published in appendix of Franz Rosenthal's 1971 The Herb.

== See also ==
- List of Ash'aris and Maturidis
