= Historic Monuments and Sites of Morocco =

The cultural heritage of Morocco (patrimoine national) is protected and promoted in accordance with Law 19-05 (2005) and Law 22-80 (1980), which relate to the nation's Historic Monuments (monuments historiques), Sites (sites), inscriptions, and objects of art and antiquity. The national heritage register, Inventaire National du Patrimoine Culturel, is maintained by the Institut National des Sciences de l'Archéologie et du Patrimoine (INSAP).

== Historic Monuments and Sites ==
Three hundred historic monuments, sites, and zones have been classed as patrimoine national:

Site	Location	Date	Comments	Coordinates	Image
Kasbah of the Udayas; Kasba des Oudaïas	Rabat			34°01′54″N 6°50′10″W	
Walls of Rabat; Enceinte de la ville de Rabat	Rabat				
Hassan Tower; Zone de protection de la tour Hassan	Rabat			34°01′27″N 6°49′22″W	
Ruins of Chellah; Ruines du Chellah	Rabat				
Mouline Mosque; Mosquée Mouline	Rabat				
Dar Es-Soltane; Dar Es-Soltane	Rabat				
Cinéma Royal; Cinéma Royal	Rabat				
Nouzhat Hassan Garden; Jardin « Nouzhat Hassan »	Rabat				
École Guessous; École Guessous	Rabat				
Belvedere Garden; Jardin « Belvédère »	Rabat				
Great Mosque; La grande mosquée	Tangier				
Site of the Ruins of Volubilis; Site des ruines de Volubilis					
Dadès Gorges; Gorges de Dades					
Ruins of Basra; Ruines de l’enceinte de Basra					
Site of Thamusida; Site de Thamusida					
Banasa; Zone de protection à l’emplacement de l’ancienne ville romaine de Banassa, actuellement appelée « Sidi Ali- Bou-Jnoun »	Safi				
Ramparts of Safi; Remparts de Safi	Safi				
Ramparts of Oujda; Remparts de la ville ancienne d’Oujda	Oujda				
Site of Lixus; Site de Lixus	Larache Province				
Kasbah of Chefchaouen; Kasba de Chefchaouen	Chefchaouen				
Great Mosque of Chefchaouen; Grande mosquée de la ville de Chefchaouen	Chefchaouen				
Kasbah El Mansouria; Kasba El Mansouria	Ben Slimane Province				
Kasbah of Caïd Ali Al-Jadida; Kasba de Caïd Ali Al-Jadida	Zagora Province				
Ancient Town of Abi Jaad; Ville ancienne d’Abi Jaad					
Medina of Essaouira (formerly Mogador)	Essaouira			31°30'49"N 9°46'16"W	Medina of Essaouira

== Monuments and buildings ==
A further ninety-eight monuments and buildings have been inscribed, in Casablanca (49), El Haouz (1), Fes (1), Kenitra (19), Larache (6), Rabat (2), and Tangiers (20).

== Museum objects ==
Thirty-seven archaeological and seventy ethnographic museum objects have been inscribed.

== See also ==
- History of Morocco
- Culture of Morocco
