= Aʿazzu Mā Yuṭlab =

Book by Ibn Tumart

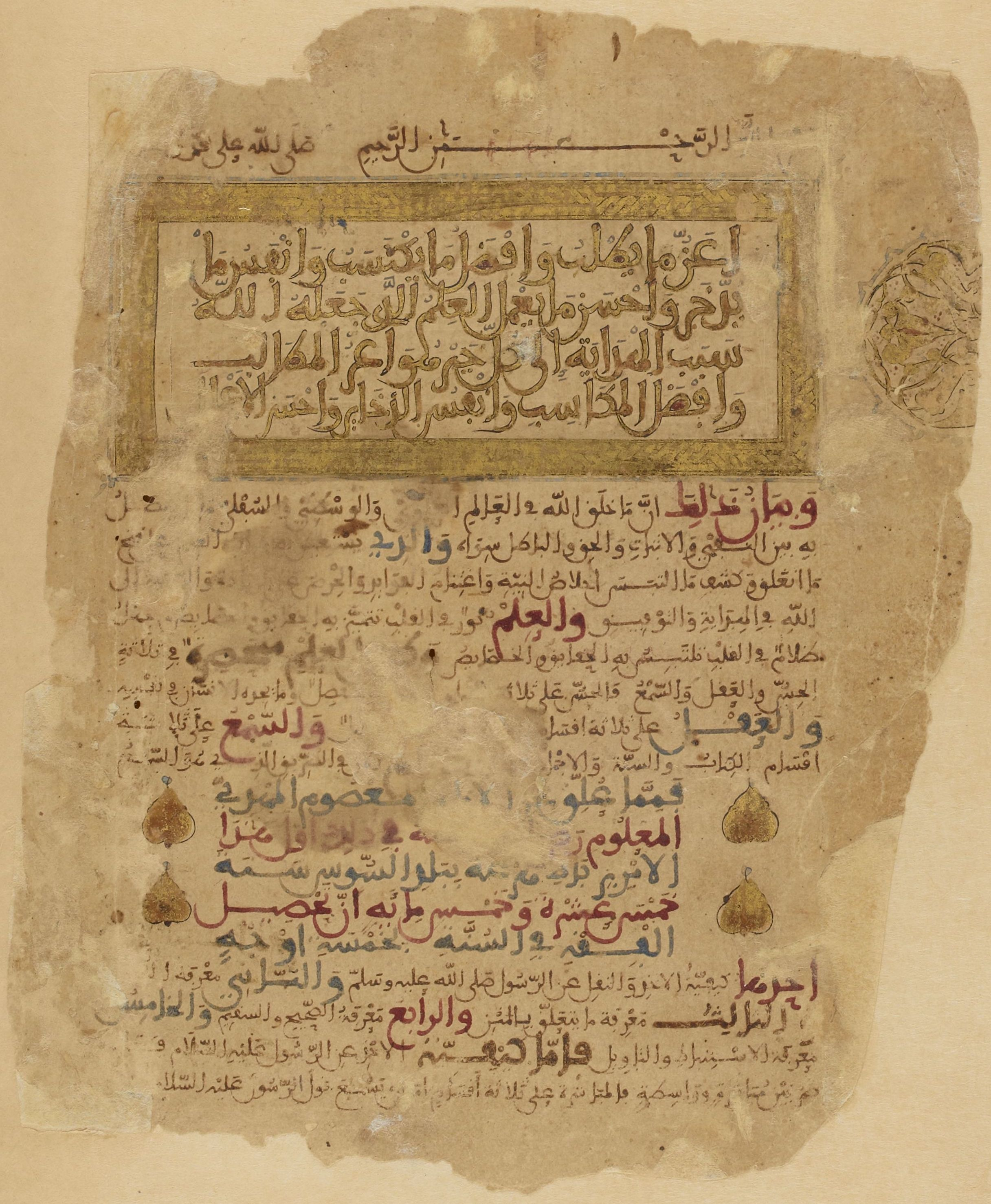
- Original title: أَعَزُّ مَا يُطْلَب
- Language: Arabic
- Subject: hadith, fiqh, usūl ad-din, tawhid, politics, jihad, reform
- Genre: Manifesto, Aqidah
- Publication place: Almohad Caliphate

Aʿazzu Mā Yuṭlab (Arabic: أعز ما يُطلب, lit. 'The Dearest Quest'), also known as al-ʿAqīda (العقيدة, lit. 'The Creed'), is a 12th-century book containing the teachings of Ibn Tumart, self-proclaimed mahdi and founder of the Almohad Caliphate. According to the text of the book itself, it was compiled by a scribe to whom Abd al-Mu'min dictated his notes from Ibn Tumart's teachings.

== Content ==
Aʿazzu Mā Yuṭlab contains a variety of topics, commentaries, summaries, and essays representing the foundation Ibn Tumart's movement. It deals with hadith, fiqh, usūl ad-din, tawhid, politics, jihad, calls for reform, and promoting beneficence and discouraging maleficence.

At the basis of Ibn Tumart's message and teachings is the concept of "tawhid," from which the Almohads got their name: al-muwaḥḥidūn (المُوَحِّدون).

== Editions ==
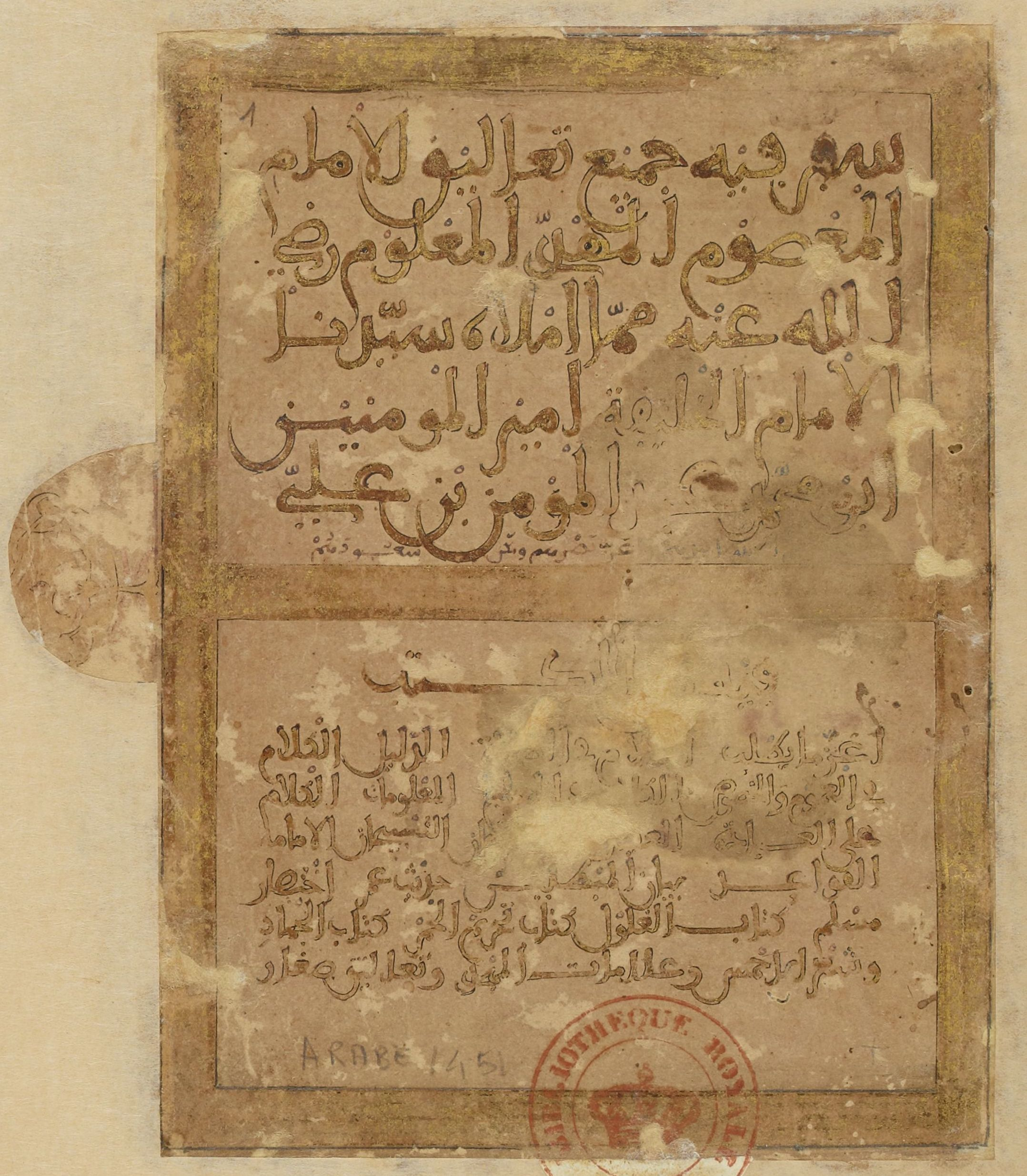
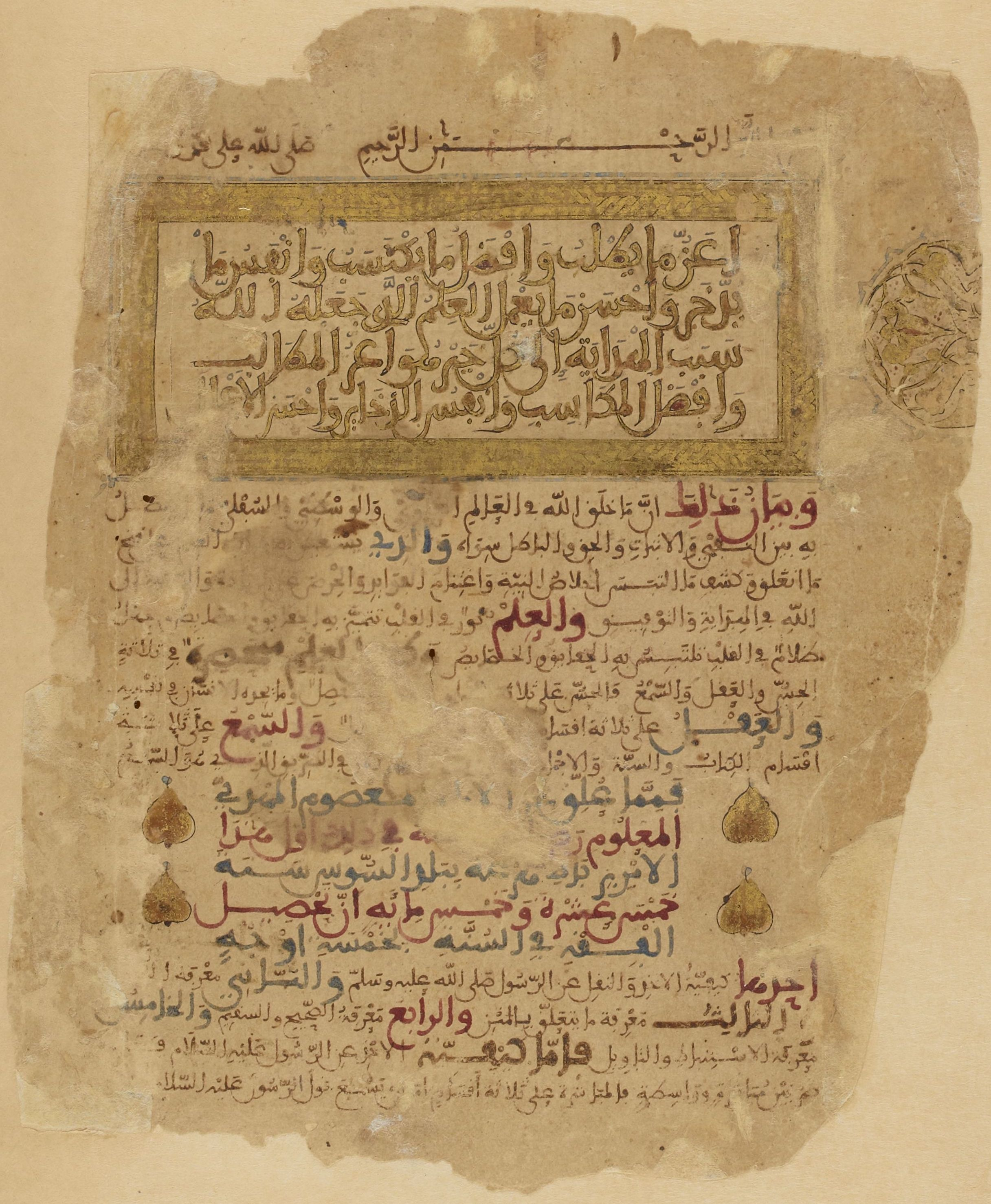
An 1183 manuscript of Ibn Tumart's E'az Ma Yutlab written in a Maghrebi script.

al-ʿAqīda was translated into Latin by the deacon Mark of Toledo in 606/1209–10, after Almohad military successes in al-Andalus, especially the Battle of Alarcos.

The Hungarian Orientalist Ignác Goldziher studied the book and published an introduction to it in 1903 (please note, however, that this work was not a French translation of Ibn Tumart's E'az Ma Yutlab) .

The original text is preserved in two manuscript copies, dated 579/1183 and 595/1199.
