= Muhammed al-Baydhaq =

12th-century Maghrebi chronicler

Mohammed al-Baydhaq
- Born: Tinmel, Actual Morocco
- Died: After 1164
- Occupation: Historian

Academic background
- Influences: Ibn Tumart

Academic work
- Era: Medieval Islamic Period
- Main interests: History of the Almohad Caliphate
- Notable works: Al-Muqtabas min Kitab al-Ansab fi Ma'arifat al-Ashab

Abu Bakr Mohammed ibn Ali al Sanhaji al-Baydhaq (Arabic: أبو بكر محمد بن علي الصنهاجي البيذق) (died after 1164) was a Maghribi historian mainly known as a companion of Ibn Tumart and chronicler of the Almohads. Al-Baydhaq (meaning pawn) was his nickname, because he was small in stature. He was from the tribe of Senhaja.

The title of his main work is: Al moqtabass min kitabi al anssab fi maärifati al ashab (written ca. 1150). It is the most important source on the period. Written in Classical Arabic, Berber words, names and sayings are used throughout the text, making it an important work for scholars of the medieval Berber language.
