= Amira Bennison =

Professor of Middle Eastern and Islamic Studies at Cambridge University

Professor Amira K. Bennison
- Born: Katherine Nicole Bennison
- Occupation: Historian

Academic background
- Education: University of Cambridge

Academic work
- Institutions: Magdelene College, University of Cambridge
- Main interests: Medieval Middle Eastern and Maghreb history
- Notable works: Jihad and Its Interpretation in Pre-colonial Morocco: State-society Relations During the French Conquest of Algeria (2002); Cities in The pre-Modern Islamic World: the urban impact of religion, state and society (2007); The Great Caliphs: the golden age of the ‘Abbasid empire (2011); The Almoravid and Almohad Empires (2016)

Amira K. Bennison is a professor of the history and culture of the Maghreb at the Faculty of Asian and Middle Eastern Studies of the University of Cambridge. She is a fellow of Magdalene College, Cambridge.

== Education ==
Bennison studied history at Cambridge University, graduating in 1989 before switching to Arabic. She then pursued graduate work, with an MA at Harvard in Middle Eastern Studies in 1992, and her PhD at SOAS in Moroccan History in 1996.

== Career ==
Bennison began her career as a Leverhulme research fellow at the University of Manchester. She began lecturing at Cambridge University in 1997, before going on to become a fully tenured member of the Faculty of Asian and Middle Eastern Studies.

She has made several TV appearances to speak about the history of the Middle East and North Africa, and regularly contributes to BBC Radio 4's In Our Time. She has also appeared on the BBC You're Dead to Me podcast.

Bennison's 2009 book The Great Caliphs: the golden age of the ‘Abbasid empire was reviewed by Hugh N. Kennedy, who said she has "a lively and engaging style", and the book will be "the first port of call for anyone looking for an introduction to the 'golden age of Islam'."

In 2022, Bennison was elected chair of the Cambridge University Press academic committee.

== Publications ==
- Amira K. Bennison. The Almoravid and Almohad Empires. The Edinburgh History of Islamic Empires. Edinburgh University Press 2016. ISBN 9780748646807
- Amira K. Bennison. The Great Caliphs: the golden age of the ‘Abbasid empire. I.B.Tauris 2011. ISBN 978-1-84885-976-0
- Amira K. Bennison and Alison L. Gascoigne (editors). Cities in The pre-Modern Islamic World: the urban impact of religion, state and society. Routledge 2007. ISBN 978-0-415-55381-0
- Amira K. Bennison. Jihad and Its Interpretation in Pre-colonial Morocco: State-society Relations During the French Conquest of Algeria. Routledge 2002. ISBN 978-0-7007-1693-7
