= Zemmouri (disambiguation) =

Zemmouri is a town and commune in Algeria.

It may also refer to:

- Zemmouri El Bahri, a village in Algeria.
- 2008 Zemmouri bombing, a terrorist attack in Algeria.
