= Bordj Menaïel (disambiguation) =

Bordj Menaïel is a commune in Boumerdès Province within Algeria.

It may also refer to:

- Bordj Menaïel District, a district in Boumerdès Province within Algeria.
- 2010 Bordj Menaïel bombing, a terrorist attack in Algeria.
