= Battle of Achir (1016) =

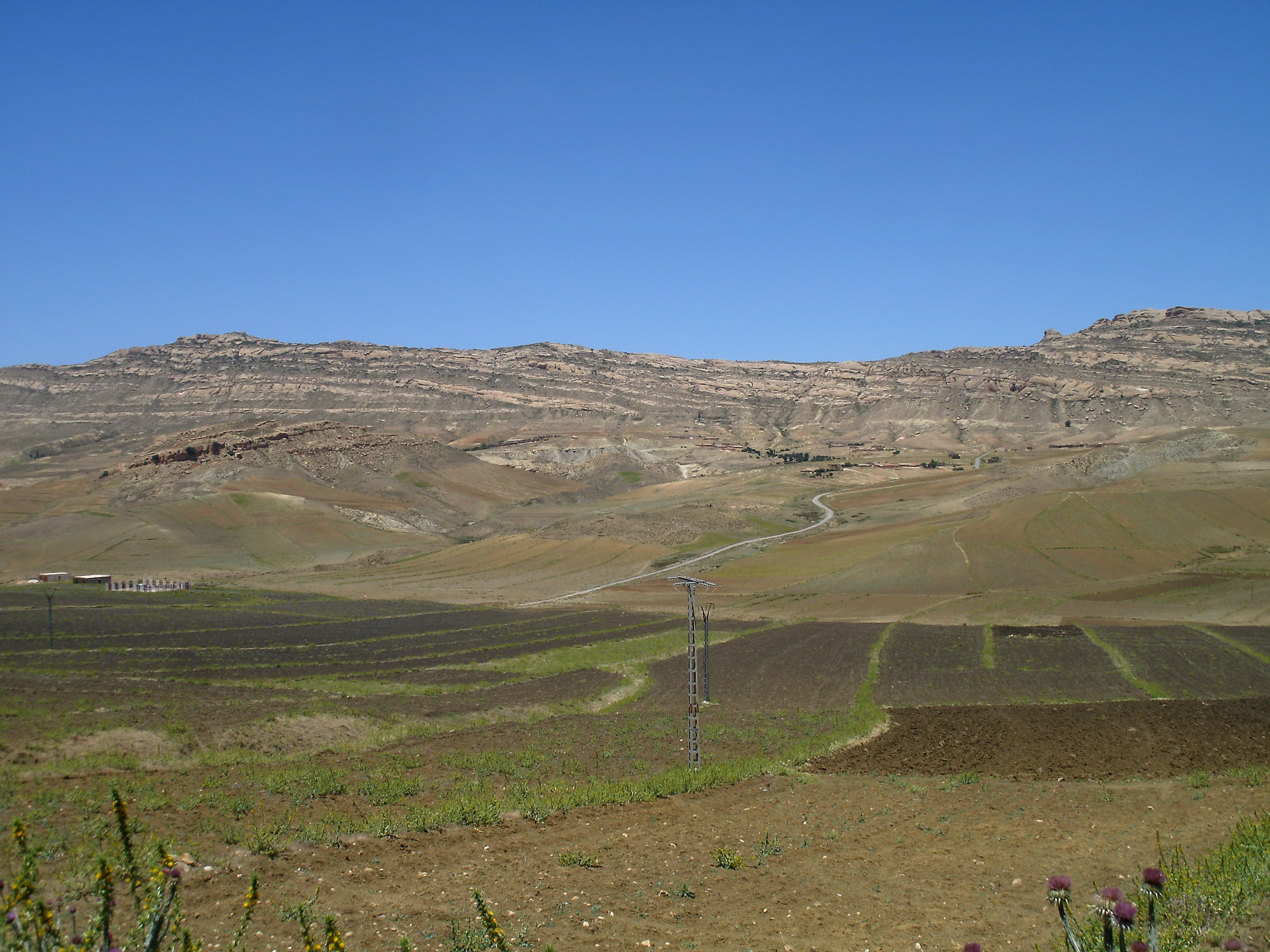
- Plains near the medieval city of Achir
Date	June 1016
Location	Achir, Kef Lakhdar; 35°56′15″N 3°14′24″E
Result	Hammadid victory
Territorial changes	Hammad reoccupied the city of Achir, which was temporarily under Zirid control.

Belligerents
Hammadid dynasty	Zirid dynasty

Commanders and leaders
Hammad ibn Buluggin	Badis ibn al-Mansur; Qarama

Strength
1,500	7,000

Casualties and losses
Unknown	Heavy

The Battle of Achir was fought in June 1016 between the Zirid army of Al-Mu'izz, the Emir of ifriqiya, and the Hammadid army under the Hammadid Emir Hammad ibn Buluggin, this battle was part of the zirid-hammadid war which resulted in the splitting of the previous Zirid domains into two independent emirates. It took place near the medieval city of Achir located in the south of the city of Algiers, and was a decisive Hammadid victory.

== Background ==
While besieging the city of Qal'at Bani Hammad, the Zirid Emir Badis died from urinary retention. At first, Habib ibn Abi Sa'id, Badis ibn Hammama, and Ayyub ibn Yatuft, who were the highest-ranked generals of Emir Badis, wanted to keep Badis's death a secret. However, in the morning, news of Badis's death came from M'sila, and its residents closed their gates and climbed onto their walls. At that point, the three commanders supported the allegiance to Qarama. When the slaves of Badis and their companions saw this, they objected. The three leaders said to them, "We have put forward Karama to protect the men and safeguard the wealth until it can be delivered to its rightful owner, Al-Muizz ibn our master Nasir al-Dawla." Then everyone agreed on Karama's departure to Achir to gather the Sanhaja and Tellakati tribes and return with them to M'sila. On the day of Eid al-Adha, the Zirid army lifted the siege and marched back to Ifriqiya. As soon as they left Al Qalaa, Hammad quickly marched to Achir with fifteen hundred men.

== Battle ==
It is worth mentioning that Al-Mu'izz ibn Badis ibn Al-Mansur sent his uncle Qarama ibn Al-Mansur to Achir on the 4th of Dhu al-Hijjah, 406 AH / May 4, 1016 AD, to recruit Sanhaja soldiers and return with them to Al-Muhammadiya (M'sila). He gave them one hundred thousand dinars from the treasury, and they joined him. While Qarama was in Ashir with the Sanhaja and Tellkati soldiers, Hammad approached him with one thousand five hundred horsemen. Qarama advanced with seven thousand fighters. They met and fought fiercely, and some of Qarama's companions retreated to the treasury, looted it, and fled, resulting in a defeat for him and his companions. He then retreated to the city of Achir, where its judge and notable residents advised him to stay and prevent Hammad from entering. He did so. Hammad besieged them and requested a meeting with Qarama. When Qarama went out to him, Hammad gave him a sum of 3000 dinars and allowed him to travel to Al-Mu'izz.

== Aftermath ==
Qarama arrived in Ifriqiya (Tunisia) on Wednesday, 19 Muharram 407 AH / June 28, 1016. Al-Muizz received him warmly and honored him, appointing him to assist in managing the affairs of the state. As for Hammad, he entered Ashir and killed a large number of the Zirid allies, but he was unable to capture the soldiers who had looted Qarama's treasury. Hammad had conquered Ashir. Al-Muizz had to begin his reign by organizing a military campaign against Hammad, who was on the verge of taking over the Central Maghreb. A year after Qarama returned to Ifriqiya, likely on Thursday, 20 Safar 408 AH / January 18, 1017 AD, the Emir, accompanied by his soldiers, moved to Raqqada, where he organized the campaign and distributed the stipends among the troops. He set out on 4 Rabi' al-Awwal 408 AH / July 31, 1017 AD, leaving Ifriqiya in the hands of his deputy, Muhammad ibn Hasan. At this time, Hammad had already reoccupied M'sila and besieged Baghai. However, when Al-Muizz approached, he lifted the siege.
