= Bordj Menaïel District =

Coordinates: 36°44′30″N 3°43′23″E

Bordj Ménaïel District دائرة برج منايل
- District
- Map of Boumerdès Province highlighting Bordj Ménaïl District

- Map of Algeria highlighting Boumerdès Province
- Country: Algeria
- Province: Boumerdès
- District seat: Bordj Ménaïl

Population (1998)
  - Total: 113,473
- Time zone: UTC+01 (CET)
- Municipalities: 5

Bordj Ménaïel is a district in Boumerdès Province, Algeria. It was named after its capital, Bordj Menaïel. Being in the far northern part of the country, it and its province have a slightly arid climate.

== Municipalities ==
The district is further divided into 4 municipalities:

- Bordj Menaïel
- Djinet
- Leghata
- Zemmouri

== Villages ==
The villages of Bordj Menaïel District are:

- B
  - Ben Younes
- E
  - El Bor
- H
  - Hadj Ahmed
- O
  - Ouled Bendou
  - Ouled Bouhmed
  - Ouled Hocine
- Z
  - Zaatra
  - Zemmouri El Bahri

== History ==
=== French conquest ===
- Expedition of the Col des Beni Aïcha (1837)
- First Battle of the Issers (1837)

=== Salafist terrorism ===
- 2008 Zemmouri bombing (9 August 2008)
- 2010 Bordj Menaïel bombing (21 September 2010)

== Rivers ==
- Oued Chender
- Oued Djemaa
- Oued Menaïel

== Notable people ==
- Farouk Belkaïd, footballer
- Abdelhafid Benchabla, boxer
- Faouzi Chaouchi, footballer
- Zinedine Ferhat, footballer
- Omar Fetmouche, artist
- Hocine Mezali, journalist and writer
- Ali Rial, footballer
- Mustapha Toumi, songwriter, lyricist, composer, poet and painter
- Fatma Zohra Zamoum, writer and film-maker
