= Al-Hamiz Valley =

River in Algiers, Algeria

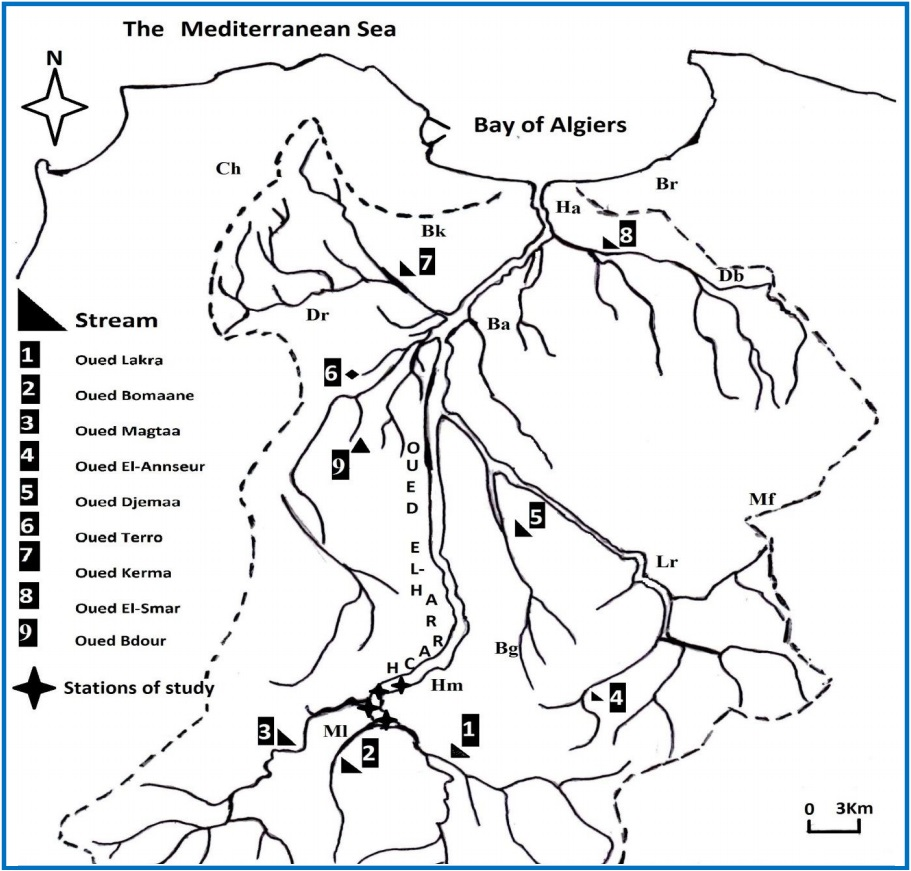
- Affluents de Oued El Harrach

Location
- Country: Algeria

Physical characteristics
- Source: Tell Atlas, Titteri, Khachna, Médéa Province
  - elevation: 624 m (2,047 ft; 341 fathoms), Médéa Province, Deux Bassins
- 2nd source: Tell Atlas, Titteri, Blida Province
  - elevation: 583 m (1,913 ft; 319 fathoms), Blida Province, Souhane
- Source confluence: Boumerdès Province,
  - elevation: 450 m (1,480 ft; 250 fathoms), Larbatache, Khemis El-Khechna,
- Mouth: Algiers Province, Bordj El Kiffan, Bordj El Bahri
  - elevation: 5 m (16 ft; 2.7 fathoms), Mediterranean Sea
- Length: 54 km (34 mi)
- Basin size: 1,200 km^{2} (460 sq mi), Drainage basin

Basin features
- Landmarks: Algeria: Médéa Province: Deux Bassins; Bouïra Province: Boukram; Blida Province: Souhane, Djebabra; Boumerdès Province: Larbatache, Khemis El-Khechna, Hammedi; Algiers Province: Dar El Beïda, Rouïba, Bordj El Kiffan, Bordj El Bahri

Al-Hamiz Valley is a prominent river in Algiers Province, stretching 54 kilometers to the east of Algiers. Its mouth is located between the municipalities of Bordj El Kiffan and Bordj El Bahri. The river originates from the Tell Atlas and Titteri Mountains near the municipality of Deux Bassins in Médéa Province. It flows through the provinces of Bouira, Blida, Boumerdès, and Algiers before emptying into the Mediterranean Sea.

== Main source ==
Al-Hamiz Valley originates in the northern part of Deux Bassins municipality, located in Médéa Province. Its source lies at a direct linear distance of 33.68 km (20.93 miles) from its mouth on the Mediterranean coast within Algiers Province. The river’s source is situated in the Tell Atlas and Titteri Mountains, which span the central regions of Médéa, Bouira, Blida, and Boumerdès provinces.

== The path ==
Al-Hamiz Valley flows through five Algerian provinces, crossing various geographical regions, including Titteri, Kabylia, Khachna, and the Mitidja plain.

States and Municipalities in the "Al-Hamiz Valley" path
Number	Médéa Province	Bouïra Province	Blida Province	Boumerdès Province	Algiers Province
01	Deux Bassins	Boukram	Souhane	Larbatache	Dar El Beïda
02			Djebabra	Khemis El-Khechna	Rouïba
03				Hammedi	Bordj El Kiffan
04					Bordj El Bahri

== The mouth ==
The mouth of Al-Hamiz Valley is located between the municipalities of Bordj El Kiffan and Bordj El Bahri in Algiers Province, near the Soumam neighborhood.

The course of the river serves as a natural boundary between these two municipalities, extending to its outlet in the Mediterranean Sea along the Algiers coastline.

=== Location ===
The mouth of Al-Hamiz Valley is situated between the municipalities of Bordj El Kiffan and Bordj El Bahri, not far from the mouth of Oued El Harrach and the Sablettes Beach.

Located east of the Oued El Harrach mouth and Sablettes Beach, this area holds a strategic position near the railway connecting El Harrach to Reghaïa. The river's mouth is approximately 20 kilometers east of the Casbah of Algiers, overlooking the Mediterranean Sea. It lies within the territories of Bordj El Kiffan and Bordj El Bahri.

== Gallery ==
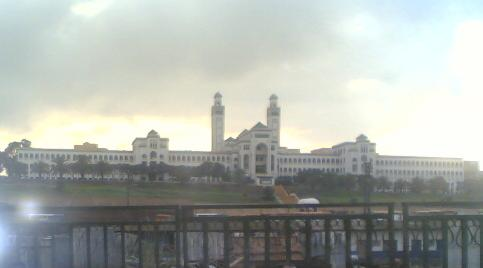
Al-Maqaria train station

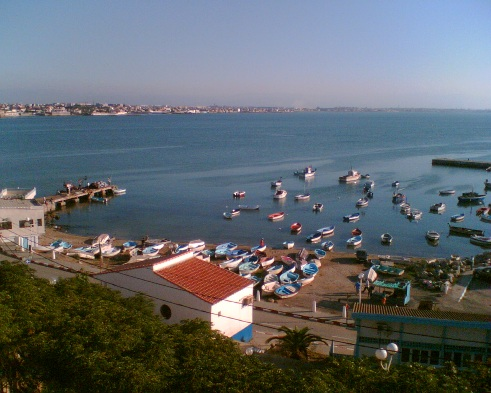
Tamentfoust port

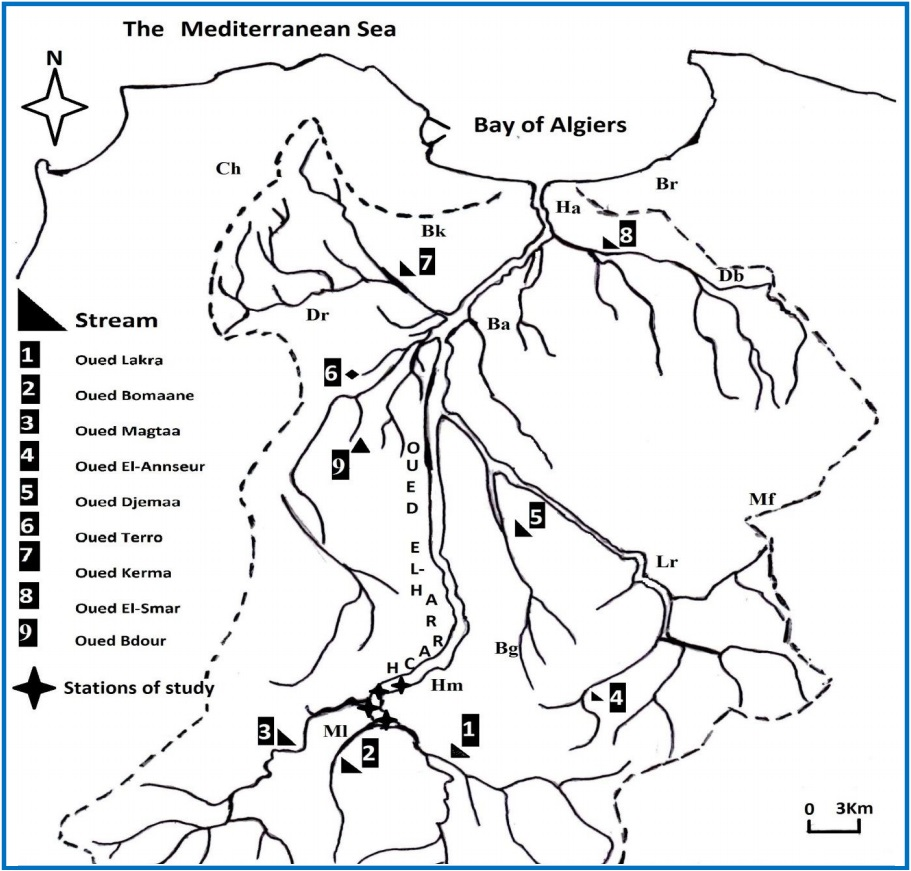
Affluents de Oued El Harrach

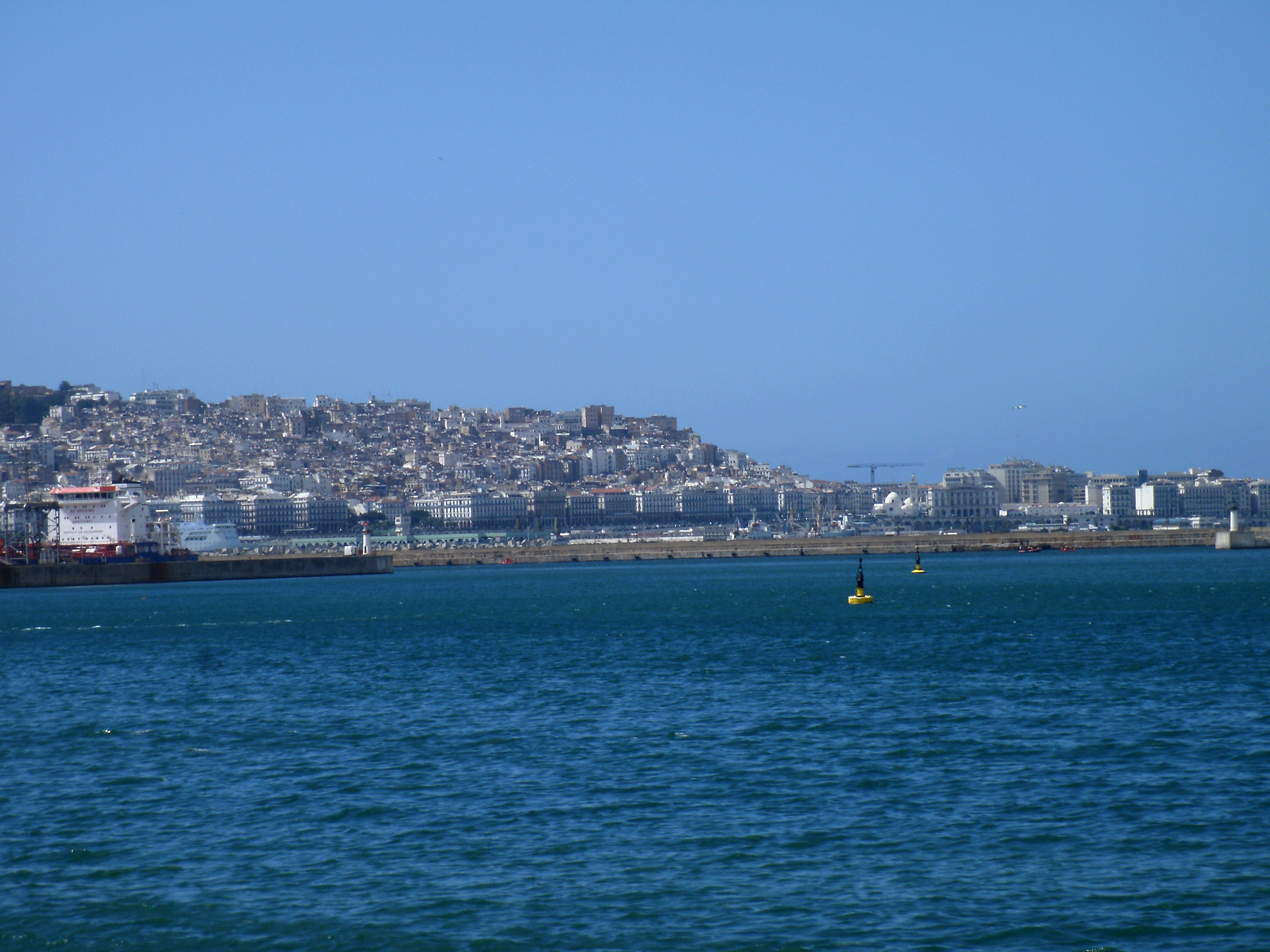
View of the Kasbah from Sablat Beach

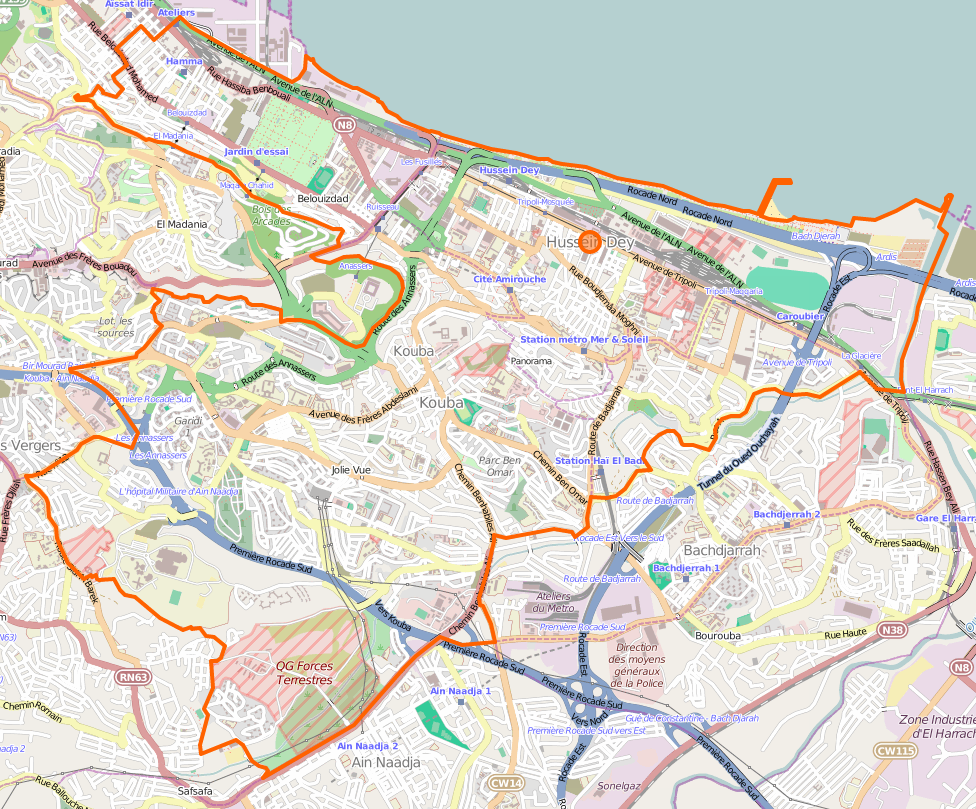
Location of Sablat Beach in Hussein Dey

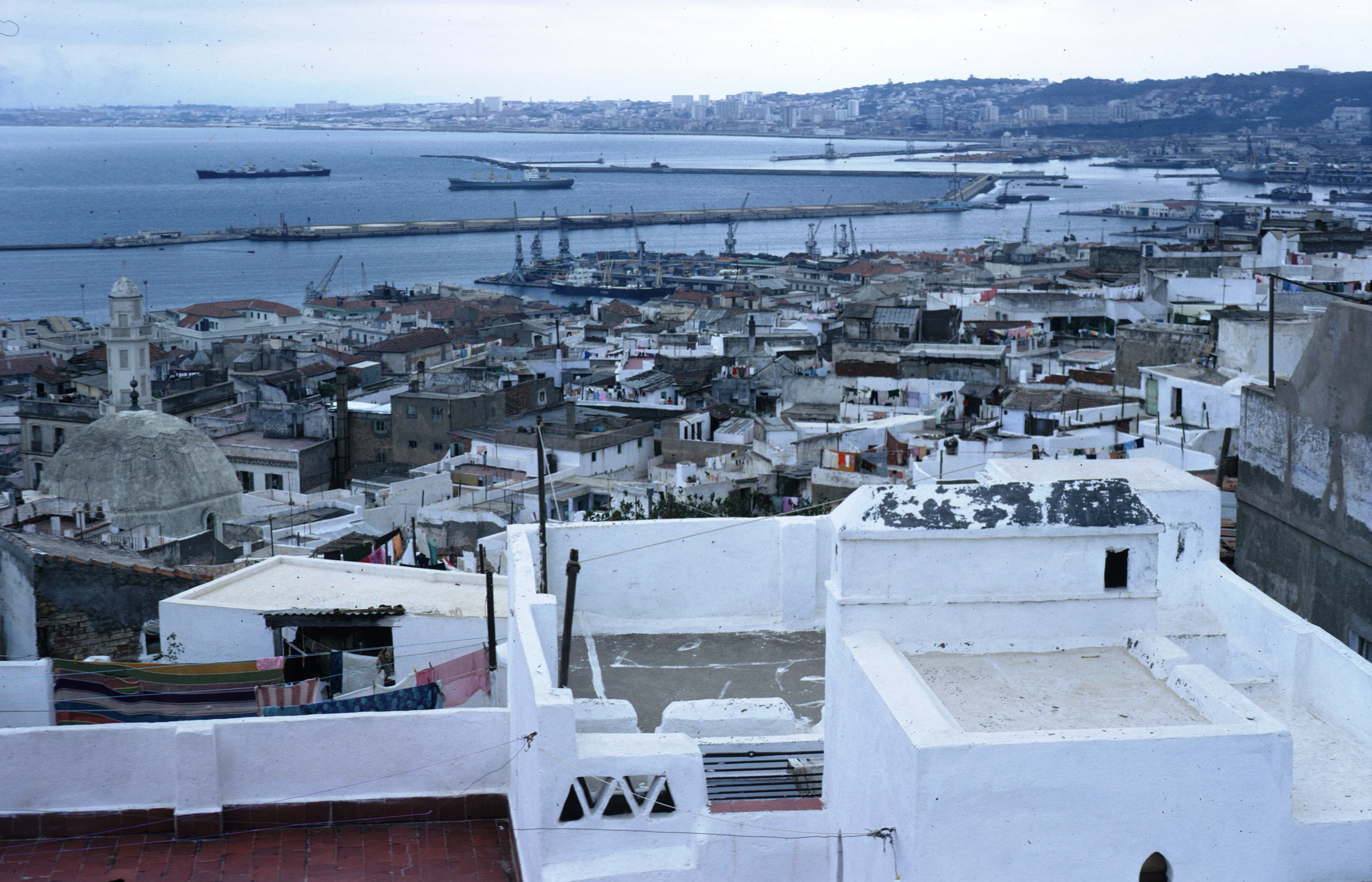
View of Sablat Beach from Safir Mosque in Kasbah

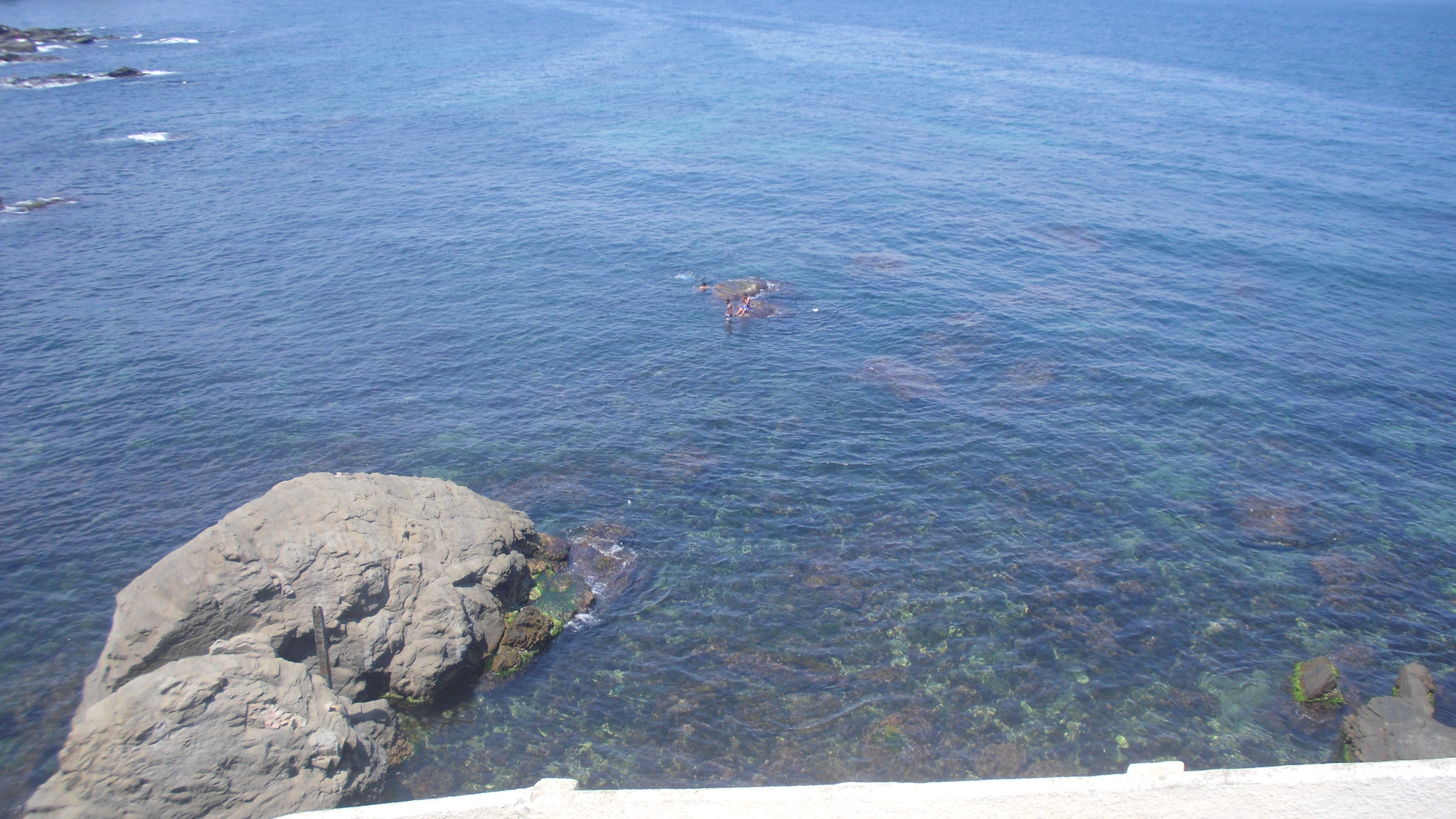
Sablat Beach Water

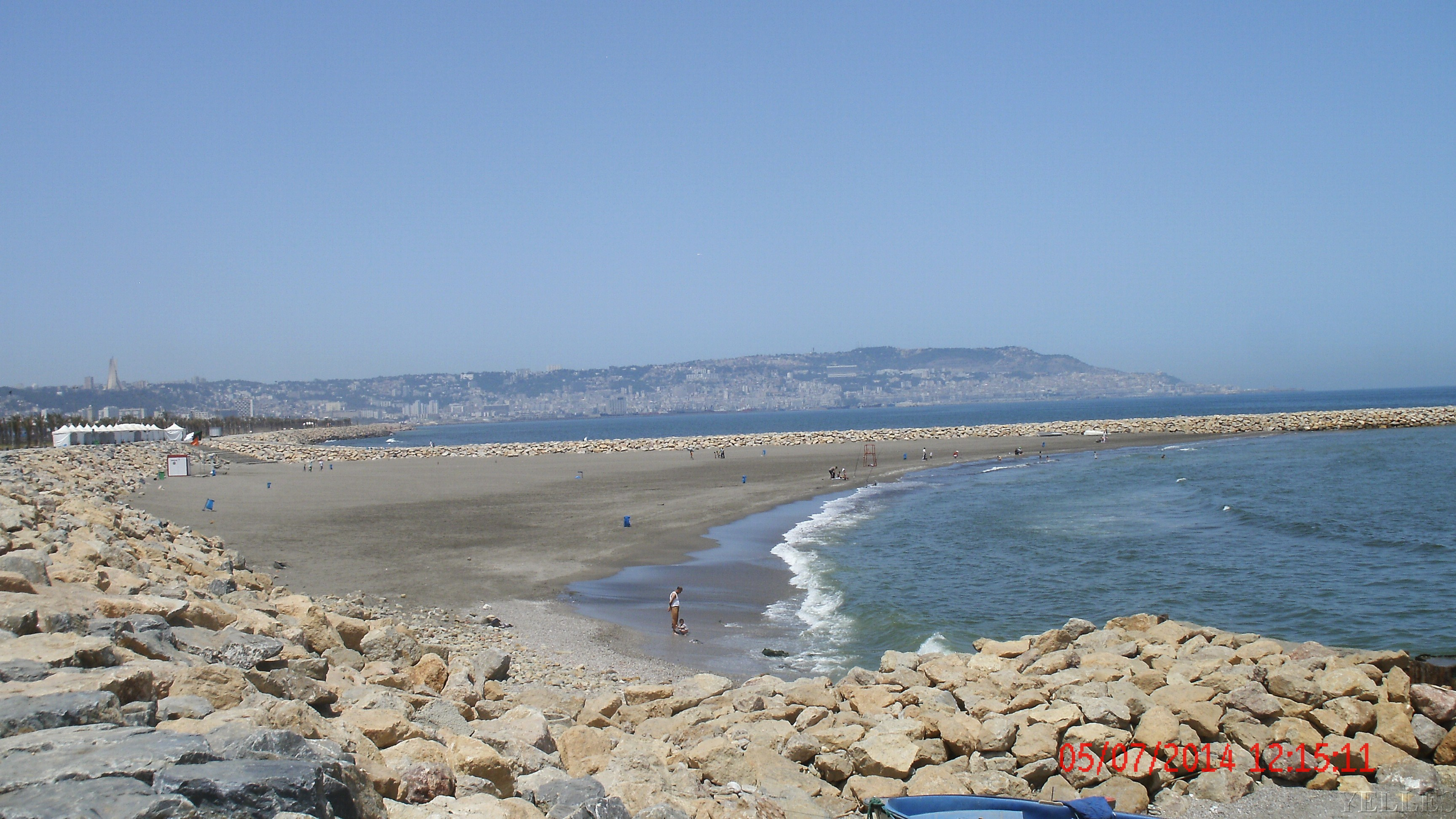
Sablat Beach

== See also ==
- List of rivers of Algeria
- Al-arbaâ Valley
- Ministry of Water Resources and Environment
- Discharge regime
- Tell Atlas
- Titteri
- Khachna
- Mitidja
- Algiers Province
- Boumerdès Province
- Blida Province
- Bouïra Province
- Médéa Province
- Tourism in Algeria
- Lists of tourist attractions
