= Rusubbicari =

Phoenician and Carthaginian colony and Roman town

- Location within Algeria
- 36°48′N 3°34′E
- Location: Algeria

Rusubbicari was a Phoenician and Carthaginian colony and Roman town. It has been tentatively identified with ruins at Zemmouri El Bahri, Algeria. The Roman town was in the province of Mauretania Caesariensis.

== Name ==
The present name is a masculine plural noun, suggesting it may have originally consisted of two or three separate settlements. It seems to a latinization of a Phoenician name including the element rush (Punic: 𐤓𐤀𐤔, rʾš, "cape") and a local Berber placename.

== Religion ==
Rusubbicari was a Christian bishopric in late antiquity and is a Catholic titular see (Latin: Dioecesis Rusubbicarensis).

=== List of bishops ===
- At the 411 Carthage conference between Catholic baptists and Donatists of Roman Africa, the town was represented by the Donatist Costanzo as the diocese on that occasion had no Catholic bishops.
- Paolino participated in the synod assembled in Carthage in 484 by the Vandal King Huneric, after which Paolino was exiled.
- José da Silva Chaves (November 29, 1967 – May 14, 1976 appointed bishop of Uruaç)
- Victor León Esteban San Miguel y Erce (May 31, 1976 – April 4, 1995 deceased)
- Douglas William Young (14 April 2000 – 17 July 2006 appointed Archbishop of Mount Hagen)
- Sergio Osvaldo Buenanueva (July 16, 2008 – May 31, 2013 appointed bishop of San Francisco)
- Jose Puthenveettil, since August 23, 2013

Today Rusubbicari survives as a titular bishopric holder; The current bishop is Jose Puthenveettil, auxiliary bishop of Ernakulam-Angamaly.

== See also ==
- Marsa al-Dajaj
- Zemmouri
