= Zemmouri El Bahri =

Zemmouri El Bahri زموري البحري
- Interactive map of Zemmouri El Bahri
- Coordinates: 36.8020008°N 3.5659653°E
- Commune: Zemmouri
- District: Bordj Menaïel District
- Province: Boumerdès Province
- Region: Kabylia
- Country: Algeria

Area
  - Total: 3 km^{2} (1.2 sq mi)

Dimensions
  - Length: 1.5 km (0.93 mi)
  - Width: 2 km (1.2 mi)
- Elevation: 32 m (105 ft)
- Time zone: UTC+01:00
- Area code: 35012

Zemmouri El Bahri is a village located in the Boumerdès Province of Algeria. It encompasses the historic medieval city of Marsa al-Dajaj.

== Location ==
The village is surrounded by Keddache River and the towns of Thénia and Zemmouri in the Khachna mountain range.

== History ==
=== French conquest ===
- Expedition of the Col des Beni Aïcha (1837)
- First Battle of the Issers (1837)

=== Salafist terrorism ===
- 2008 Zemmouri bombing (9 August 2008)

== See also ==
- Marsa al-Dajaj
