= Ouled Bouhmed =

- Motto: أولاد بوحمد
- Interactive map of Ouled Bouhmed
- Coordinates: 36.7750548°N 3.5898974°E
- Commune: Zemmouri
- District: Bordj Menaïel District
- Province: Boumerdès Province
- Region: Kabylie
- Country: Algeria Algeria

Area
  - Total: 6 km^{2} (2.3 sq mi)

Dimensions
  - Length: 2 km (1.2 mi)
  - Width: 3 km (1.9 mi)
- Elevation: 270 m (890 ft)
- Time zone: UTC+01:00
- Area code: 35012

Ouled Bouhmed is a village in the Boumerdès Province in Kabylie, Algeria.

== Location ==
The village is surrounded by Keddache River and the towns of Thénia and Zemmouri in the Khachna mountain range.
