= Al-arbaâ Valley =

River valley in Boumerdès Province, Algeria

- Location within Algeria

Location
- Country: Algeria

Physical characteristics
- Source: Tell Atlas, Khachna, Boumerdès Province
  - elevation: 550 m (1,800 ft; 300 fathoms), Boumerdès Province, Ouled Aissa, Boumerdès
- 2nd source: Tell Atlas, Boumerdès Province
  - elevation: 480 m (1,570 ft; 260 fathoms), Boumerdès Province, Sidi Daoud
- Source confluence: Boumerdès Province
  - elevation: 230 m (750 ft; 130 fathoms), Sidi Daoud, Djinet
- Mouth: Boumerdès Province, Sidi Daoud, Djinet
  - coordinates: 36°45′37.25″N 3°28′28.89″E
  - elevation: 5 m (16 ft; 2.7 fathoms), Mediterranean Sea
- Length: 14 km (8.7 mi)
- Basin size: 35 km^{2} (14 sq mi), Drainage basin

Basin features
- Landmarks: Algeria:Boumerdès Province: Ouled Aissa, Boumerdès, Sidi Daoud; Djinet

Al-arbaâ Valley is a watercourse originating from the Khachna Mountains and flowing through the regions of Ouled Aissa and Sidi Daoud. It empties into the Mediterranean Sea to the east of Djinet, passing through Boumerdès Province.

== Description ==
Al-arbaâ Valley is one of the main waterways in the eastern drainage basin of Djinet and the western area of Sidi Daoud in Boumerdès Province. This hydro-graphic basin covers an area of approximately 35 square kilometers within the "Al-Droa'a Mountains" of the Khachna range.

The tributaries feeding this river descend from an altitude of 550 meters within the municipalities of Ouled Aissa and Sidi Daoud, continuing their flow through the municipality of Djinet until reaching the Mediterranean Sea. Its mouth lies on the border between Sidi Daoud and Djinet.

This watercourse benefits from numerous mountain springs, in addition to rainfall and melting snow, which collectively gather its water. It plays a vital role in Boumerdès Province, bordered by Sebaou River to the east and Isser River to the west.

== Path ==
Al-arbaâ Valley flows through a single coastal Algerian province, Boumerdès, located within the Khachna Mountains.

Municipalities in Boumerdès on the "Al-arbaâ Valley" path
Number	Boumerdès Province
01	Ouled Aissa, Boumerdès
02	Sidi Daoud
03	Djinet

== Roads ==
Al-arbaâ Valley intersects with several roads along its course.

Roads in the "Al-arbaâ Valley" route
Number	Boumerdès Province
01	National Road 24
02	State Road 18

== Pollution ==
Al-arbaâ Valley is relatively less affected by water pollution due to its course lying outside the urban and residential fabric of Sidi Daoud and Boudouaou's surroundings.

However, indiscriminate dumping of solid waste, debris, and rubble has narrowed the Stream bed along its course outside these towns. Additionally, the discharge of wastewater from nearby villages has turned it into a source of unpleasant odors and harmful insects.

== Floods ==
Al-arbaâ Valley experiences flooding during the rainy season due to rainwater flowing from the upper areas of the municipalities of Ouled Aissa, Sidi Daoud, and Djinet. These floods occasionally submerge its mouth near the bridge on National Road No. 24.

The primary cause of these floods is the blockage of the rainwater drainage system by soil and stones.

To address this issue, plans are underway to mitigate the problem as part of the ongoing project to expand and upgrade the national road. This includes the construction of a high and elevated bridge to prevent the river's waters from flooding the roadway.

== Dam ==
Al-arbaâ Valley Dam, also known as Sidi Daoud Dam or Hamrouna Dam, was constructed on the course of Al-arbaâ Valley to mitigate the frequent flooding affecting Sanouine Village in Sidi Daoud and Ouled Benoua Village in Djinet. Construction began in 1973, and the dam was completed in 1975 with a storage capacity of 3.7 million cubic meters. Its primary purpose is to prevent floodwaters from impacting these coastal villages and the bridge on National Road No. 24.

In addition to flood protection, the dam has been used for aquaculture since April 2010. Fish species such as silver carp and Redbreast tilapia were introduced into its reservoir, which also supports agricultural irrigation. However, the dam's water is not suitable for drinking, necessitating the sourcing of fresh water for the surrounding mountainous areas, including Ouled Aissa.

The reservoir's heavy water conditions make swimming unsafe, and accidents have occurred due to the muddy nature of its banks. Upon the dam's inauguration in the mid-1970s, local farmers expressed optimism about using its water for irrigation. However, the theft and degradation of pumps and pipelines hindered efforts to expand vegetable farming in the region, specifically in the plains of Yesser and Dellys.

Despite being designed to irrigate over 609 hectares, farmers rely on costly water tanker services to sustain their agricultural activities. Promises have been made to rehabilitate the dam's infrastructure by installing new pumps and larger pipelines to maximize its stored water usage. Such improvements could also enhance the dam's tourism potential, given its proximity to natural attractions such as Boubrak Forest and Mount Sidi Daoud, which rises to 595 meters.

The dam's sedimentation has significantly reduced its capacity, with nearly half of the reservoir filled with silt since 1978. A desilting operation is necessary to restore its water storage capacity. The existing infrastructure, including an old water transfer station and two storage tanks in the villages of Sanouine and El-Aaradj, provides a foundation for reactivating the dam's irrigation and water management capabilities.

== See also ==
- List of rivers of Algeria
- Al-arbaâ Valley
- Ministry of Water Resources and Environment
- Discharge regime
- Tell Atlas
- Khachna
- Boumerdès Province
- List of beaches
- Tourism in Algeria
- Lists of tourist attractions
