= Ben Younes =

- Motto: بن يونس
- Interactive map of Ben Younes
- Commune: Zemmouri
- District: Bordj Menaïel District
- Province: Boumerdès Province
- Region: Kabylie
- Country: Algeria Algeria

Area
  - Total: 5 km^{2} (1.9 sq mi)

Dimensions
  - Length: 2 km (1.2 mi)
  - Width: 2.5 km (1.6 mi)
- Elevation: 140 m (460 ft)
- Time zone: UTC+01:00
- Area code: 35012

Ben Younes is a village in the Boumerdès Province in Kabylie, Algeria.

== Location ==
The village is surrounded by Keddache River and the towns of Thénia and Zemmouri in the Khachna mountain range.

== History ==
This village has experienced the facts of several historical events:

- Expedition of the Col des Beni Aïcha (1837)
- Battle of the Col des Beni Aïcha (1871)
