= Marsa al-Dajaj =

Ancient city in Algeria

- مرسى الدجاج (Arabic)
- Interactive map of Marsa al-Dajaj
- 36°48′0.95688″N 3°33′54.62003″E
- Location: Zemmouri El-Bahri, Algeria
- Region: Boumerdès Province

Marsa al-Dajaj (Arabic: مرسى الدجاج) is an ancient city located in the current territory of Zemmouri-El Bahri, in the Province of Boumerdès, Algeria. It was discovered in 2006.

== History ==
=== Origins ===
Marsa al-Dajaj was founded on the ruins of the ancient Roman-era port of Rusubbicari, which was a major city in Mauretania Caesariensis, and which was built on a Carthaginian trading post dating back to the 6th century BC.

=== Medieval era ===
Marsa al-Dajaj occupied an important commercial and military role in the medieval Maghreb for centuries. The city was named after the chicken (dajaj), which was abundant in the area. The author of Kitāb al-Istibṣār fī Aʻjāʼib al-Amṣār also noted the large presence of quails in the nearby sea. Al-Maqdisi was the first author to write about the city, during the 10th century, describing it as attached to Ifriqiya.

==== Description and layout of the city ====
Marsa al-Dajaj was located on the Mediterranean coast, with, to the west Djazair Beni Mezghenna, to the east Ras Djinet and Tadallis, and to the south Suq Hamza. According to Muhammad ibn Abd al-Munim al-Hamiri, author of al-Rawd al-Mi’tar, quoting earlier sources such as Al-Idrisi's Nuzhat al-Mushtaq fi Ikhtiraq al-Afaq [The Pleasure of Him Who Longs to Traverse the Horizons], the city was surrounded by the sea on three sides and was heavily fortified with a wall stretching from the western to the eastern bank. Marsa al-Dajaj had a small, insecure port due to its narrowness and shallow depth. Access to the city was through a single main gate. Its markets and main mosque were located within these walls. The city was large and had a circular fortress; it was also described as a prosperous city, figs were exported, fresh or dried, to distant regions, which contributed to the renown of the city, while fruits, dairy and meat were cheap. Water was and remains abundant with a lot of springs in the surrounding area. The surrounding areas of the city were wheat and barley fields, which were abundant commodities and constantly cultivated. According to Ibn Hawqal, Marsa al-Dajaj is a city surrounded by a strong defensive wall along the seashore and its edge. The author of Kitāb al-Istibṣār fī Aʻjāʼib al-Amṣār described that "the sea hits against the city's walls".

==== Politics ====
The city was governed by Abdallah ibn Nasir ibn Alnas, who also governed Algiers during the last quarter of the 11th century.

==== Economy and trade ====
The local economy relied primarily on agriculture, livestock, and artisanal production, with a huge naval trade participation. Cultivated crops included wheat, barley, and fruits such as figs, lemons and oranges. historian al-Bakri (11th century) mentioned Marsa al-Dajaj and described the routes leading to it from Kairouan and from the city of Ashir, noting that the city was under the ownership of the Fatimid state and the supervision of the Hammadid rulers. Regarding its port, it had maritime connections with the island of Mallorca. Among the main routes:

===== Kairouan → Marsa al-Dajaj =====
Anyone traveling from Kairouan to Marsa al-Dajaj would first go to M’sila, then to Ouzgour, a place with a cold freshwater spring and a large tree. This marked the last boundary of the Sanhaja lands before reaching the Souq Maxen, a city along the Chelif River belonging to the Sanhaja, with walls and springs. From there, the route led to Souq Hamza, a walled city with a moat and fresh water wells, also inhabited by the Sanhaja. The local ruler of Souq Hamza was Hamza ibn al-Hasan ibn Sulayman ibn al-Husayn ibn Ali ibn al-Hasan ibn Ali. Next came Beni Jennad, a small city on a mountain about a mile from the sea, before finally reaching Marsa al-Dajaj.

===== Ashir → Marsa al-Dajaj =====
From the city of Ashir, one would travel to Shu’ba, a village, then through a pass between two mountains, which leads to the Afih plain where Aqer Qarha veins converge. From this location, goods were transported far and wide. In that area lies the city of Hamza, which was founded by and named after Hamza ibn al-Hasan ibn Sulayman ibn al-Husayn ibn Ali ibn al-Hasan ibn Ali ibn Abu Talib. Al-Hasan ibn Sulayman was the one who entered the Maghreb, and among his sons were Hamza, Abdullah, Ibrahim, Ahmad, Muhammad, and Qasim, all of whom left descendants there.

The route continues from Hamza to Belyas, located on a large mountain, and from Belyas to Marsa al-Dajaj.

==== Population and social structure ====
The population was in majority composed of Andalusians, Sanhaja and Kūtama tribes. The population size is described as significant, although many residents would leave during the summer out of fear of naval attacks. Guilds and professional associations structured social and economic life, regulating skills, maintaining discipline within trades, and providing networks of support among members.

=== Destruction ===
The city was destroyed in 1225 by Yahya ibn Abi Ghaniya al Mayurqi, who led a large revolt against the Almohads. Abi Ghaniya's forces destroyed multiple cities and their fortifications, including Marsa al-Dajaj. It remained under the sand for a little less than 8 centuries before being discovered again in 2006. Dellys took the role of Marsa al-Dejaj after the latter's destruction in the 13th century.

== Archaeological site ==
The archaeological site of Marsa al-Dajaj extends onto 7 hectares and was classified at the national cultural heritage of Algeria in 2016. Ruins of homes with courtyards and wells dating back to the 10th-12th centuries were discovered, as well as ceramics, iron kitchenware, pottery and iron door knockers. Other artefacts from earlier periods were also discovered, as the site is organized in stratas reflecting different time periods.

- Achir
- Al-Batha, Algeria
