= Talkata =

Branch of the Berber Sanhaja

The Talkata or Telkata constitute a branch of the sedentary faction of the Sanhaja in central Maghreb, with their stronghold being Titteri, during the Middle Ages. They played a prominent role in the history of the Muslim Maghreb and are the progenitors of the Zirid dynasties that ruled over central Maghreb, Ifriqiya, and Al-Andalus. The Telkata tribe went extinct during the French Invasion of Algeria.

== Origins ==
The Talkata originate from the sedentary branch of the Sanhaja. The ethnonym "Sanhaja" refers to a grouping of Berber tribes that played a significant historical role during the medieval period. Dynastic powers emerging in the Maghreb and Andalusia evidenced the growing influence of several Sanhajan tribes, both sedentary in central Maghreb and nomadic in the Sahara, particularly during the era of the Zirid monarchy.

The Sanhadja were divided into two branches: the non-nomadic tribes, engaged in agriculture and herding, residing in the mountains of central Maghreb; and the nomadic tribes, represented by those inhabiting the Sahara. Ibn Khaldun enumerated nearly seventy branches, with one of the most significant being the Talkata, who occupied a portion of central Maghreb. Smaller groups were situated in the Atlantic plains of Morocco. However, none of these Sanhajan tribes wielded any political power, unlike the two others.

The ancestors of the Sanhaja, during the early Roman Empire, constituted a Maurean tribe in the Djebel Titteri (future stronghold of the Zirids) with a city known as Vsinazense. The name Vsinaza, documented in the early 3rd century in the region, is a toponym derived from Vsinazi These transcriptions refer to the same Berber name, that of the Iẓnagen.

According to Berber genealogists, the Sanhadja were one of the seven major branches descended from Burnis, the son of Barr. The Sanhaja, the Masufa (anciently Masofi), and the Lamadiya (anciently Lambdienses) were among the communities that formed the sedentary Sanhadja confederation during the Middle Ages. This significant tribal confederation was led from the 10th century onward by the Talkata branch.

Medieval genealogists provided often conflicting lineages. The most widespread, though not necessarily the most reliable, traces the lineage of the Talkâta back to the Himyarites. Ibn Khaldun describes the Telkata as descending from Telkat, the son of Kert, who is the son of Sanhaj. He identifies the main subdivisions as the Matennan, Ouennougha, Botuiya, Banu Mazghinna, Banu Uthman, and Banu Khalil.

== Territory and lifestyle ==
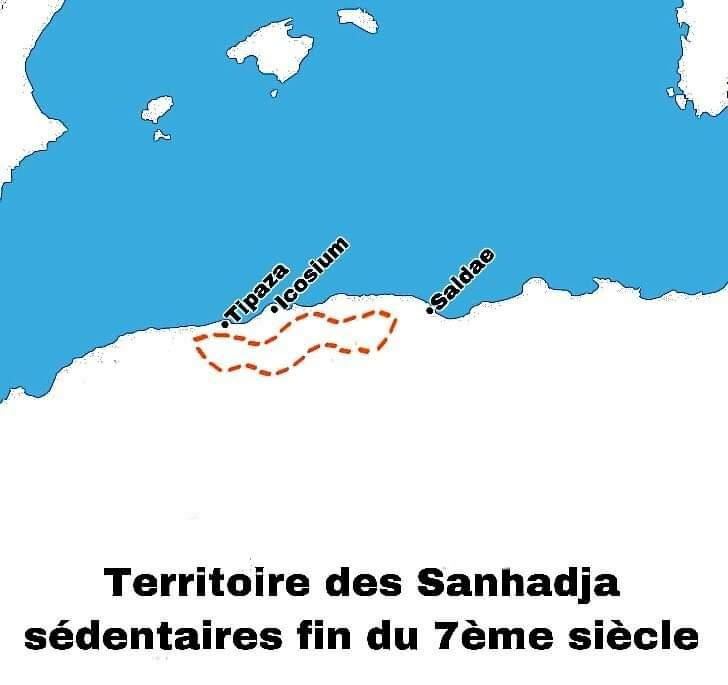
Map of the Telkata tribe (7th Century)

The northern Sanhajan tribes inhabited the territories between the Ouarsenis, Titteri, and the southern Bibans The Talkata constitute the major Sanhajan tribe in central Maghreb in which they occupy a part of it.

They were mountain dwellers residing in the Tell Atlas south of Algiers in Titteri. According to Bouzid Aleya, who conducted a comprehensive study on the Sanhaja, the earliest Sanhajan groups mentioned in the early Middle Ages were situated in the eastern part of central Maghreb, specifically west of the Zab. The author distinguishes them from the nomadic Sanhaja of the Sahara. Within this sedentary group, the Talkata were established east of Tlemcen, in the regions of Algiers, Msila, Medea, and Béjaïa.

According to Ibn Khaldun, the Talkata occupied the same region stretching from M'sila, Hamza, Algiers, Miliana, to the Moulouya, with the exception of several enclaves belonging to other tribes, including Zenata fractions. The Talkata were primarily mountain dwellers, sedentary people settled along the slopes of a mountain, fragmented into narrow fertile valleys where life centered around small settlements.

During the emergence of the Zirid family, the territory of the Talkata was located in the Titteri region, characterized by a relatively high average altitude, ensuring a relatively temperate climate. The rainfall, although unpredictable, was sufficient to support some prosperous crops, particularly cereals. Their domain also encompassed several cities, including Médéa, Miliana, and Achir.

They were neighbors to the Zwawa to the northeast, who lived in a more secluded manner. To the south, they bordered the Zenata, their perennial enemies. The Berbers of the Bibans, separating Titteri from Msila, had stronger ties with them. The Talkâta could reach Djezaïr béni Mezghanna, a small port of relatively little interest to the Berbers.

In the 10th century, Ibn Hawqal assessed the state of the region. Around Achîr, he observed abundant natural springs, gardens, and cultivated fields. In Miliana, described as an "ancient city," he noted mills along the river, "from which it extensively draws irrigation for its fields, while also partially benefiting from the Chelif River." The land of the Talkâta provided very satisfactory living conditions, making it comfortable for the early Zirids.

== History ==
The Talkâta, a branch of the Sanhajan confederation, played a prominent role in the history of the Muslim Maghreb during the 10th, 11th, and 12th centuries The Talkata tribe was poised to exert a supremacy over the other tribes of Central Maghreb, partially explaining its numerical density. However, this seems even more attributable to the prowess of leaders who skillfully organized and formed it into an army ready for remarkable achievements. In the 10th century, they held dominance over Central Maghreb when allied with the Fatimids, and later they established the Zirid dynasty.

During the Muslim conquest of the Maghreb, the Kutamas and the Sanhaja (including the Talkata) inhabited Central Maghreb, including the Aurès Mountains, Greater Kabylie, as well as the regions of Tahert and Tlemcen. The first known leader of the Talkāta was Menad ibn Manḳūs, whose son Ziri is the ancestor of the Zirid dynasty and the founder of their capital, Achir, in the Djabal Titteri (in 935) The location of this fortress allows them to have control over the routes serving the High Plains, the Mitidja, and the Kabylie.

As hereditary enemies of their Zenata neighbors, clients of the Umayyads of Cordoba (led by the Maghraouas and Banu Ifren from the Tlemcen region), the Sanhadja of Central Maghreb (originally centered in the Djebel Titteri) opted for an alliance with the Fatimids Converted to the Isma'ili Shiite doctrine in the 10th century (later returning to Sunnism), the Talkāta actively participated in the Fatimid war against the Kharijite Berbers.

Bologhine ibn Ziri, leader of the Takalta tribe in Southern Algiers, is appointed governor of Central Maghreb by the Fatimids due to the role of his father, Ziri ibn Menad, during the Kharijite revolts of Abu Yazid and expeditions against the Zenata in Oran. The Zirid dynasty, which ruled in the 10th and 12th centuries, originated from the Algerian branch of the Sanhaja. The Zirids are associated with the tribes of the Hammadids and Badicides.

The commitment of the Talkāta in the service of the Fatimids continued under the leadership of Bologhine, enabling the Shiite caliphate to assert its presence in Central and Western Maghreb at the expense of the Umayyads of Cordoba and their Zenata allies in the capture of Fes in 995. In the early 11th century, a branch of the family, the Hammadids, established another center of power by founding Qalâa in the Hodna region (Béjaïa in 1090). Later, Zawi founded the Taifa of Granada in Al Andalus.

During the French Conquest of Algeria, there was no longer a significant Berber group identified as Talkata. The Zwawa had taken over the territories that were once the homeland of the Kutama and Talkata.
