= Djinet =

Djinet جنات
- Commune and town
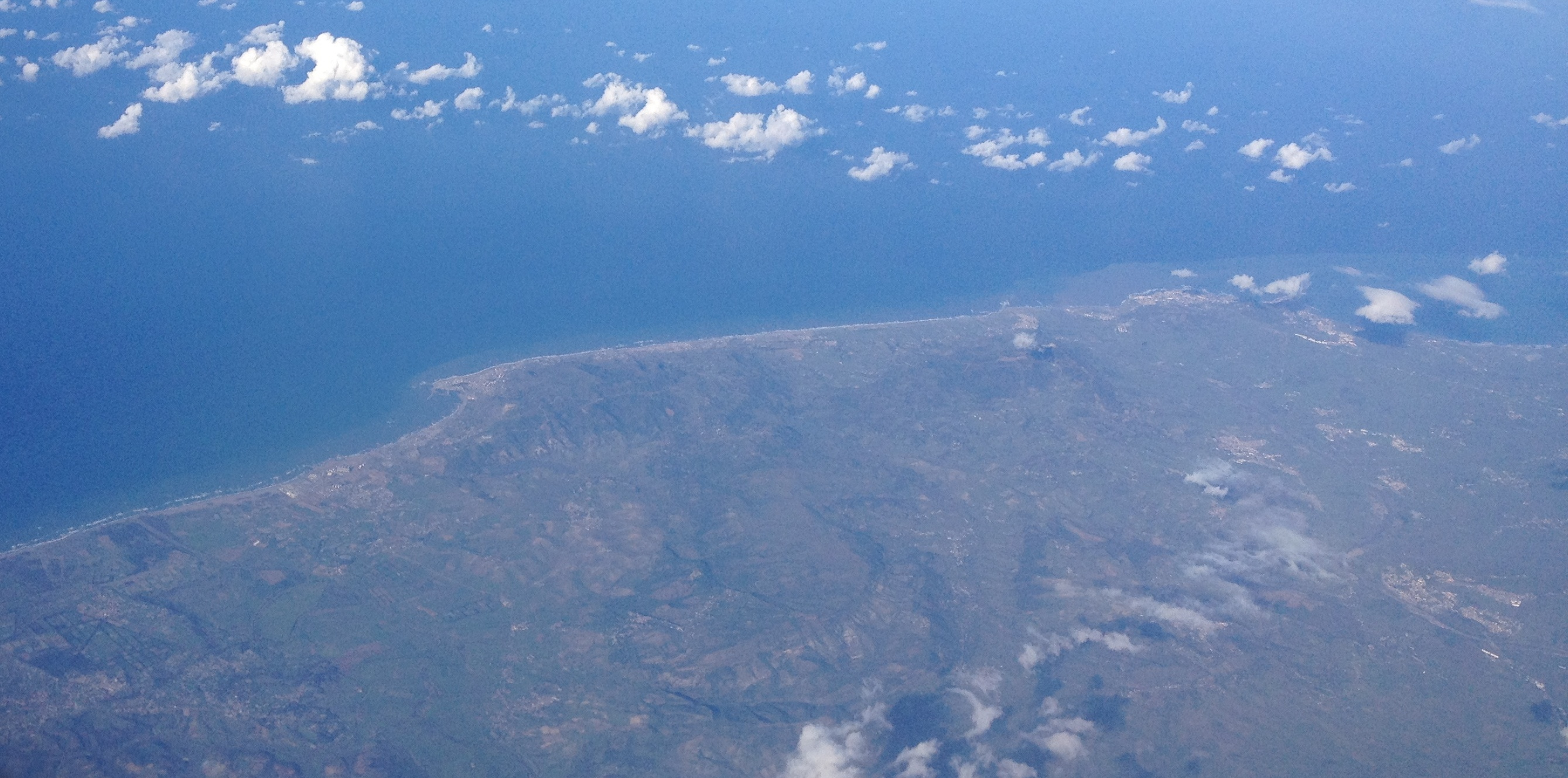

- Location within Algeria
- Coordinates: 36.876977°N 3.723121°E
- Country: Algeria
- Province: Boumerdès
- District: Bordj Ménaïl

Population (2008)
  - Total: 21,966
- Time zone: UTC+1 (CET)

Djinet (Arabic: جنّات Jannāt), the classical Cissi, is a port town and commune in the Bordj Menaïel District of Boumerdès Province, Algeria, east of the mouth of the Isser River and around Cape Djinet. As of 2008, the population of the municipality is 21,966.

The town is particularly notable for its power plant and accompanying desalination unit. A fishing port recently built there, originally scheduled to open in 2007, became fully operational only in 2016 due to problems with sand accumulation.

== History ==
Djinet was a Phoenician and Carthaginian colony under the name Kissi or Kishi (Punic: 𐤊𐤔, kš, if Lipiński's interpretation of an inscription found there is accepted) The name was hellenized as Kissḗ.

After the Punic Wars, it fell under Roman control. Its name was Latinized as Cissi and it was placed into the province of Mauretania Caesariensis. It appeared on the Tabula Peutingeriana. The ruins of a 4th or 5th-century Christian church could still be easily distinguished at Cape Djinet up to the 19th century, but little trace now remains.

After 484, it disappears from written sources for several centuries, including the 7th-8th century Muslim conquest of the Maghreb, only to reappear in the 11th century work of al-Idrisi under the new name of Jannād, after a Berber tribe then living in the area. It was known to medieval European geographers as Berengereto. By the 18th century, Djinet was a small port town serving the farmers of the surrounding lowlands, described by Thomas Shaw in the following terms:

...we come to the little port of Jinnett, from which a great quantity of grain is shipped off yearly to Christendom. Jinnett is a small creek, with tolerably good anchoring grounds before it; and was probably Edrisi's Mers' el Dajaje, or Port of Hens. I was told that Jinnett, or Paradise, was given to this place, on account of a row-boat, which was once very providentially conducted within the creek, when the mariners expected every moment to have perished upon the neighbouring rocks.

The area was conquered by France in 1837 in the wake of the First Battle of the Issers, and remained under French rule until Algeria's independence in 1962.

In 1986, a gas-powered thermal power plant was commissioned at Djinet, manufactured by Siemens with a capacity of 704 MW.

=== Ecclesiastical history ===
Roman Cissi was a Christian bishopric, suffragan to the metropolitan of Carthage. The names of two of its bishops are known:

- At a Conference of Carthage (411) between Catholic and schismatic Donatist bishops, where their heresy was condemned as such, Cissi was represented only by a Donatist bishop named Flavosus. The Latin adjective referring to Cissi, Cissitanus, is applied to him in the account of that conference. In the 19th century, Morcelli took the adjective Cessitanus to refer to Cissi, and supposed instead that the name of the Cissi bishop at the conference was Quodvultdeus, whom Ferron rather attributed to the see of Cissita, which was in Africa Proconsularis and presently in Tunisia (Sidi-Tabet?).
- In 484, Bishop Reparatus of Cissi was one of the Catholic bishops whom the Arian king Huneric of the Vandal Kingdom summoned to Carthage and then exiled like most Catholic bishops.

The diocese was nominally restored in 1933 as the Catholic titular bishopric of Cissi (Latin: dioecesis Cissitana). Its bishops have been:

- Jean de Capistran Aimé Cayer, OFM (1949.06.17 – 1978.04.13)
- Augusto Vargas Alzamora, SJ (1978.06.08 – 1989.12.30)
- Olindo Natale Spagnolo Martellozzo, MCCJ (1990.02.02 – 2008.07.23)
- Enrique Eguía Seguí (2008.09.04 to present), Auxiliary Bishop of Archdiocese of Buenos Aires

== Transport ==
Djinet is connected to the rest of the country through a single main road: RN 24, a coastal road leading to Algiers in the west (via Zemmouri) and Béjaïa in the east (via Dellys).

== See also ==
- List of Catholic dioceses in Algeria
- Al-arbaâ Valley
