= El Bor =

- Motto: البور
- Interactive map of El Bor
- Coordinates: 36.7795965°N 3.6157058°E
- Commune: Zemmouri
- District: Bordj Menaïel District
- Province: Boumerdès Province
- Region: Kabylie
- Country: Algeria Algeria

Area
  - Total: 3 km^{2} (1.2 sq mi)

Dimensions
  - Length: 2 km (1.2 mi)
  - Width: 1.5 km (0.93 mi)
- Elevation: 320 m (1,050 ft)
- Time zone: UTC+01:00
- Area code: 35012

El Bor is a village in the Boumerdès Province in Kabylie, Algeria.

== Location ==
The village is surrounded by Keddache River and the towns of Thénia and Zemmouri in the Khachna mountain range.
