= Bordj Menaïel =

City in Algeria

Bordj Menaïel برج منايل
- City and Common
- Nickname: Burǧ Imnayen
- Motto: "From the people, for the people"
- Location of Bordj Menaïel in the Boumerdès Province

- Location of Bordj Menaïel in the Algeria
- Coordinates: 36.741667°N 3.723056°E
- Country: Algeria
- Province: Boumerdès Province
- District: Bordj Menaïel District
- APC: 2012-2017

Government
  - Type: Municipality

Population (2008)
  - Total: 64,820
- Time zone: UTC+1 (CET)
- ISO 3166 code: CP

Bordj Menaïel (from the Arabic برج - bordj, "tower" and Berber imnayen "cavaliers") is a town in the Boumerdès Province in Algeria. It is located in the western Kabylie region at 36°44′30″N 3°43′23″E and is 30 km away from the city of Boumerdès. As of 2008, the population of the municipality is 64,820.

== Presentation ==
Bordj Menaïel was founded by the Ottoman government of Algeria, most likely in the 16th century, to guard a route between Algiers and Constantine and to secure control of the Isser plain. In the 18th century, its military role was superseded by the foundation of Bordj Sebaou further west, but it remained the residence of the Ottoman wakil administering the surrounding farmland.

The French conquest reached the fort of Bordj Menaïel in 1844, when General Bugeaud took it. Afterwards, it initially became the residence of the aghas of the Iflissen Umellil. In 1859, a French colony was created there by imperial decree, using 1718 hectares. It was enlarged through land expropriation in 1872 by Admiral de Gueydon, in the wake of the Mokrani Revolt.

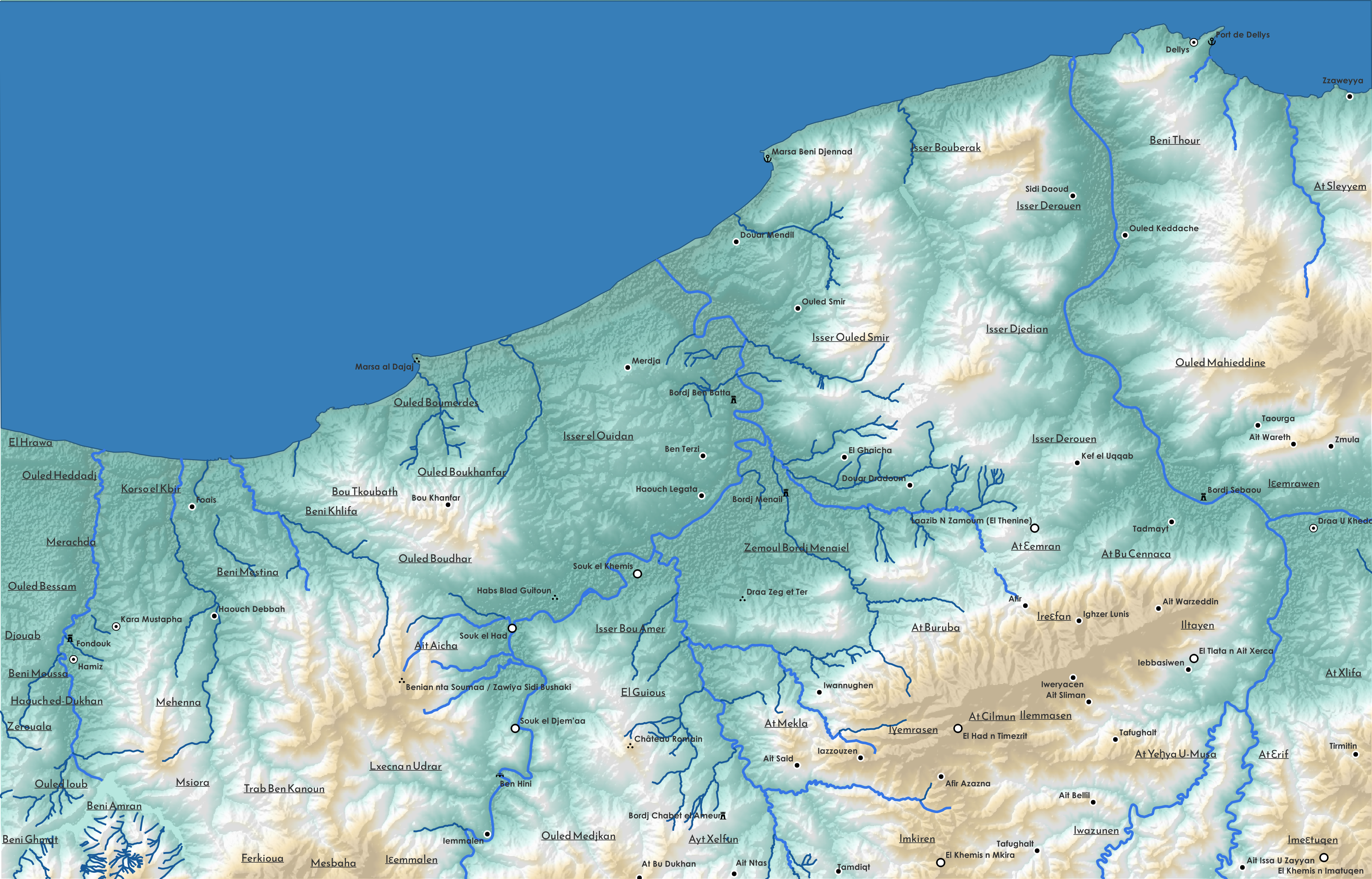
The Boumerdes province region in 1830, at the start of the French invasion. The Bordj Menail is visible in the center of the map.

== History ==
=== French conquest ===
- Expedition of the Col des Beni Aïcha (1837)
- First Battle of the Issers (1837)

=== Salafist terrorism ===
- 2008 Zemmouri bombing (9 August 2008)
- 2010 Bordj Menaïel bombing (21 September 2010)

== Transport ==
The road RN 12 runs through Bordj Menaïel, linking it with Isser to the west and Naciria to the east.

== Sports ==
Algeria goalkeeper Faouzi Chaouchi was born in Bordj Menaiel. The local football team is JS Bordj Ménaïel.

== Notable people ==
- Farouk Belkaïd, footballer
- Faouzi Chaouchi, footballer
- Zinedine Ferhat, footballer
- Omar Fetmouche, artist
- Hocine Mezali, journalist and writer
- Mustapha Toumi, songwriter, lyricist, composer, poet and painter
- Fatma Zohra Zamoum, writer and film-maker
