= Ouled Hocine =

- Motto: أولاد الحسين
- Interactive map of Ouled Hocine
- Coordinates: 36.7792626°N 3.5962766°E
- Commune: Zemmouri
- District: Bordj Menaïel District
- Province: Boumerdès Province
- Region: Kabylie
- Country: Algeria Algeria

Area
  - Total: 4 km^{2} (1.5 sq mi)

Dimensions
  - Length: 2 km (1.2 mi)
  - Width: 2 km (1.2 mi)
- Elevation: 140 m (460 ft)
- Time zone: UTC+01:00
- Area code: 35012

Ouled El Hocine is a village in the Boumerdès Province in Kabylie, Algeria.

== Location ==
The village is surrounded by Keddache River and the towns of Thénia and Zemmouri in the Khachna mountain range.
