= Zemmouri =

Zemmouri زموري
- Commune and town
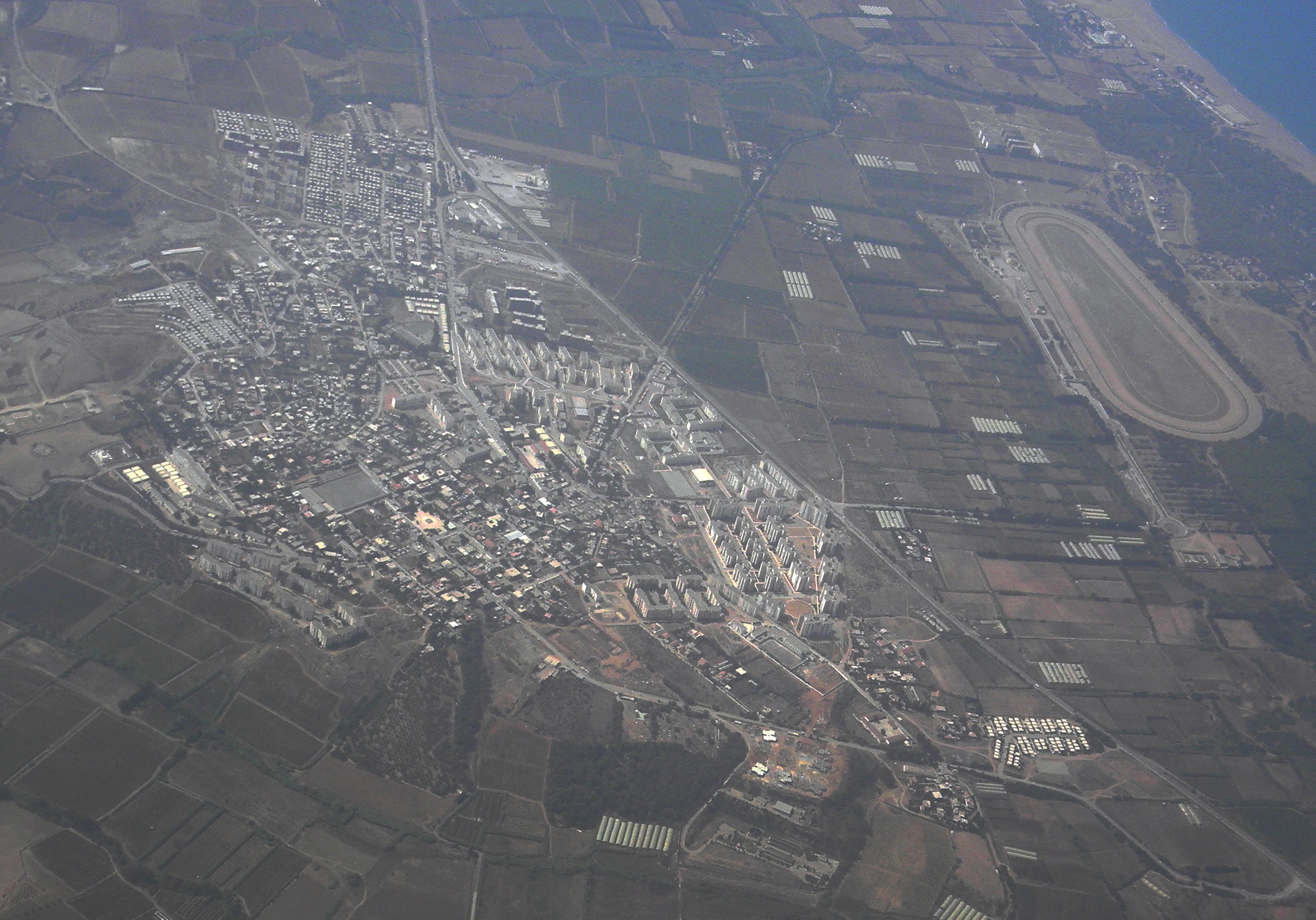

- Location within Algeria
- Coordinates: 36°47′N 3°36′E
- Country: Algeria
- Province: Boumerdès Province

Population (2008)
  - Total: 26,408
- Time zone: UTC+1 (CET)

Zemmouri is a town and commune in the Bordj Menaïel District of Boumerdès Province, Algeria. As of 2008, the population of the municipality is 26,408.

== Villages ==
The villages of the commune of Zemmouri are:

- B
  - Ben Younes
- E
  - El Bor
- H
  - Hadj Ahmed
- O
  - Ouled Bendou
  - Ouled Bouhmed
  - Ouled Hocine
- Z
  - Zaatra
  - Zemmouri El Bahri

== History ==
The coastal site of Zemmouri El-Bahri was a Phoenician and later Roman settlement named Rusubbicari. In the medieval period, it became a small port named Marsa al-Dajaj (literally "chicken port"). Archeological research there has uncovered medieval structures and pottery, as well as Roman coins.

By the 19th century the main village, slightly further inland, was known as Zemmouri (usually spelled Zamouri or Zemouri at the time). In 1872 the French government established a colonial settlement there using land confiscated from the Isser el-Ouidan tribe and from private individuals in the wake of the Mokrani Revolt; in 1886 it was renamed Courbet, after Admiral Amédée Courbet. Following Algeria's independence in 1962, the name Zemmouri was restored.

=== French conquest ===
- Expedition of the Col des Beni Aïcha (1837)
- First Battle of the Issers (1837)

=== Salafist terrorism ===
- 2008 Zemmouri bombing (9 August 2008)

== Geology ==
The disastrous 2003 Boumerdès earthquake led to the discovery of a thrust fault; it was subsequently named after the town. The fault has since been incorporated into seismic hazard maps, which will serve as an important guideline for public safety.

== Nature ==
To the northwest of the town, the Sahel Forest and the coastal dunes on which it grows are dominated by Aleppo pine and other Mediterranean maquis flora, and constitute a tourist attraction.

== Notable people ==
- Kris

- Abdelhafid Benchabla, boxer
- Ali Rial, footballer
