= Ouled Aissa, Boumerdès =

- Commune and town

- Location within Algeria
- Coordinates: 36.80666°N 3.81431°E
- Country: Algeria
- Province: Boumerdès Province

Population (1998)
  - Total: 6,773
- Time zone: UTC+1 (CET)

Ouled Aissa, Boumerdès is a town and commune in Boumerdès Province, Algeria. According to the 1998 census it has a population of 6,773.

== History ==
- First Battle of the Issers (1837)
