= Hocine Mezali =

Algerian journalist and writer

- حسين مزالي
- Born: 5 March 1938 (age 88); Bordj Menaïel, Algeria
- Education: University of Algiers
- Occupations: Militant, journalist, writer
- Writing career
- Language: French language
- Notable works: Battle of Algiers (1956–1957); El Moudjahid; The Battle of Algiers

Hocine Mezali (Arabic: حسين مزالي) (born in Bordj Menaïel on 5 March 1938) is an Algerian journalist and writer. He had been the head of intelligence during the Battle of Algiers (1956–1957).

== Early life ==
Mezali was born in 1938 in the town of Bordj Menaïel in the lower Kabylia region of Algeria, east of the Khachna Massif and south-east of the town of Boumerdès. In his youth, his secondary studies were interrupted by the student strike of 19 May 1956, during the Algerian revolution. Mezali then joined the National Liberation Front (FLN) and National Liberation Army (ALN). He served as the head of intelligence in the Autonomous Zone of Algiers (French: Zone autonome d'Alger) during the Battle of Algiers (1956–1957).

Exiting Algeria in 1957 after the Battle of Algiers, Mezali pursued a university education and studied in several European countries, notably in Germany where he studied philosophy. On his return to Algeria after its independence in 1962, he enrolled at the University of Algiers where he studied law.

== Career ==
Mezali contributed to creating the Algerian press, and his long career in official organs began in 1963 after Algerian independence was regained.

=== L'Ouvrier Algérien ===
Mezali began his journalistic career in the periodical "L'Ouvrier Algérien" affiliated with the Union générale des syndicats algériens (UGSA), which was later taken over by the General Union of Algerian Workers (UGTA). Mezali was among the journalists who launched the first issue of this publication dated 17 August 1962.

Mezali contributed to building the Algerian press building by joining in efforts to build its key structures.

=== El Moudjahid ===
In 1965, Mezali joined the daily El Moudjahid, a press organ launched that year which brought together some of the best French-speaking Algerian journalists of the time.

Mezali preferred to cover lectures and debates led by leading figures in thought and dialectics in the 1960s and 1970s.

His enthusiasm for the journalistic profession led him to also work at the Algeria Press Service (APS) and the Révolution Africaine, positioning himself as an Algerian press pioneer during the post-independence period.

=== Television ===
Mezali was a collaborator of Gillo Pontecorvo's team who directed the film The Battle of Algiers and was the main literary assistant of his close friend Saadi Yacef in his book about the Battle of Algiers (1956–1957).

Mezali was the studio floor manager of the Casbah Film company's cinematographic epic in 1966. He also participated in television productions as a media professional. He was among the journalists who instilled a dynamic of democratic openness in the only TV channel existing in Algeria.

=== Horizons ===
When Horizons newspaper was launched on 1 October 1985, Mezali was appointed to supervise the society section of this French-speaking daily, several of whose journalists came from the editorial staff of El Moudjahid and Algérie-Actualité.

=== L'Observateur ===
After a brief stint in the daily Le Nouvel Hebdo, Mezali left after a disagreement over the newspaper's editorial positions. He then served as director of the monthly review L'Observateur published in Algiers from 1 March 1991, until November 1991.

== Books ==
Mezali has written several books in his career, including:

- (1982) The battle of Algiers(French: La bataille d'Alger).
- (1984) The Conflagration (French: L'embrasement).
- (2008) The Temptation of Double Play (French: La tentation du double jeu).
- (2009) Algiers: 32 Centuries of History (French: Alger: 32 siècles d’histoire).
- (2013) Ferhat Abbas, A Man, A Visionary (French: Ferhat Abbas, un homme, un visionnaire).
- (2014) A Young Man from a Good Family – The Metamorphosis (French: Un jeune homme de bonne famille – La métamorphose).
- (2015) The Lord of Fifty (French: Le seigneur des cinquante).

== See also ==
- List of Algerians
- List of Algerian writers
- List of newspapers in Algeria
- El Moudjahid

== Bibliography ==
- Central Intelligence Agency (1968). Consolidated Translation Survey, Volume 6. Algiers: Foreign Documents Division. p. 15.
- André Abbou, Jacqueline Lévi-Valensi (1972). Journalisme et politique: l'entrée dans l'histoire (1938–1940). Paris: Les lettres modernes. p. 327.
- Saadi Yacef, Hocine Mezali (1982). La bataille d'Alger. Paris: Éditions E.T.C. p. 247 pages.
- Saadi Yacef, Hocine Mezali (1984). L'embrasement. Algiers: ENAL. p. 405 pages.
- Algériens-Français, bientôt finis les enfantillages?. Paris: Éditions Corlet. 2003. p. 7. ISBN 978-2847060324.
- Hocine Mezali (2008). La Tentation du double jeu. Algiers: Éditions Mille-feuilles. p. 205 pages. ISBN 978-9947905098.
- Hocine Mezali (2009). Alger: 32 siècles d'histoire. Algiers: ENAG Editions. p. 292 pages. ISBN 978-9961620762.
- Hocine Mezali (2013). Ferhat Abbas, un homme, un visionnaire. Algiers: Dar Othmania. p. 318 pages. ISBN 978-9931368038.
- Hocine Mezali (2014). Un jeune homme de bonne famille - La métamorphose. Algiers: Dar Othmania. p. 312 pages. ISBN 978-9931368304.
- Hocine Mezali (2015). Le seigneur des cinquante. Algiers: ENAG Editions. p. 329 pages.
