= Titteri =

Mountainous historical region in Algeria

- Tittri / جبل التيطري
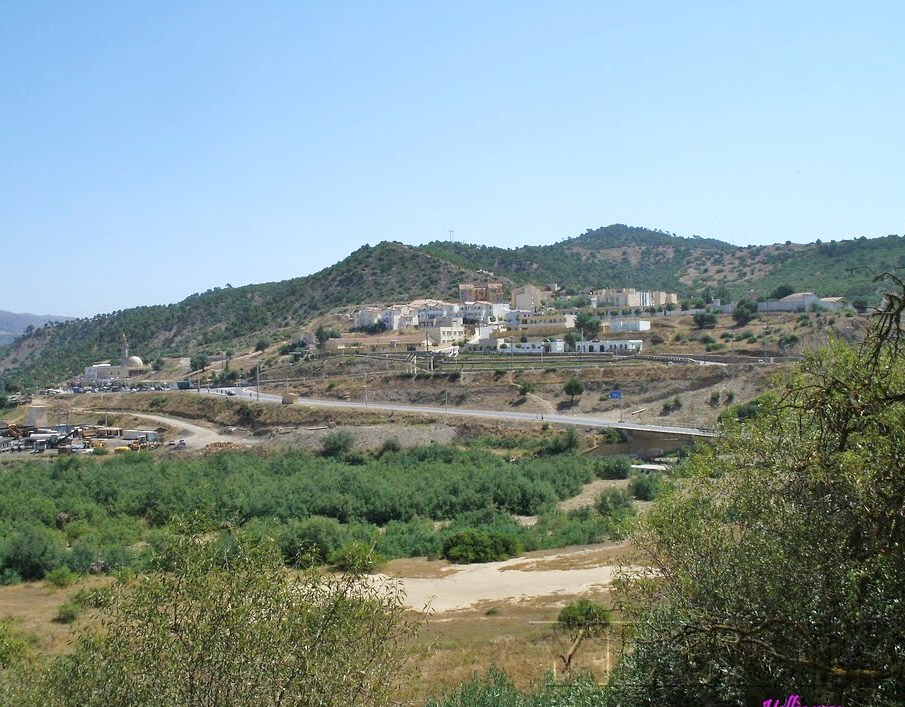
- Landscape of the Mezghena commune in the Titteri, Médéa Province

Highest point
- Peak: Djebel Dirrah
- Elevation: 1,485 m (4,872 ft)
- Coordinates: 36°16′0″N 2°45′0″E

Geography
- Location within Algeria
- Location: Médéa Province, Algeria
- Parent range: Blidean Atlas

The Titteri (Arabic: جبل التيطري, Berber languages: Tittri) is a historical region in Algeria. It is located in the mountainous area of the southern Tell Atlas in the Atlas Mountains.

== Geography ==
The Titteri was a former administrative division of the Regency of Algiers. It is located in the area of Médéa, stretching across parts of Aïn Defla, Bouïra, Djelfa and M'Sila Province as well. Its northern zone corresponds to the southern slopes of the Blidean Atlas and its southern part reaches the western Bibans. The climate of the area is semi-arid.

The highest summit of the range is 1,485 m high Djebel Dirrah (جبل ديرة). Other notable peaks of the Titteri are 1,423 m high Djebel Guern el-Adhaoura (جبل قرن العذاورة), 1,416 m high Djebel Kef Lakhdar (جبل الكاف الأخضر) and 1,400 m high Kef Afoul (جبل كاف آفول).

The main tribes inhabiting the Titteri area were the Aït Ouzera, the Aït Bou Yaagoub and the Aït Slimane, who spoke the Blidean Atlas variant of the Shenwa language. Some of the traditional activities of the region included beekeeping and cattle-rearing.

== See also ==
- List of mountains in Algeria
- Al-Hamiz Valley
