= Deux Bassins =

Deux Bassins فج الحوضين
- Commune and town
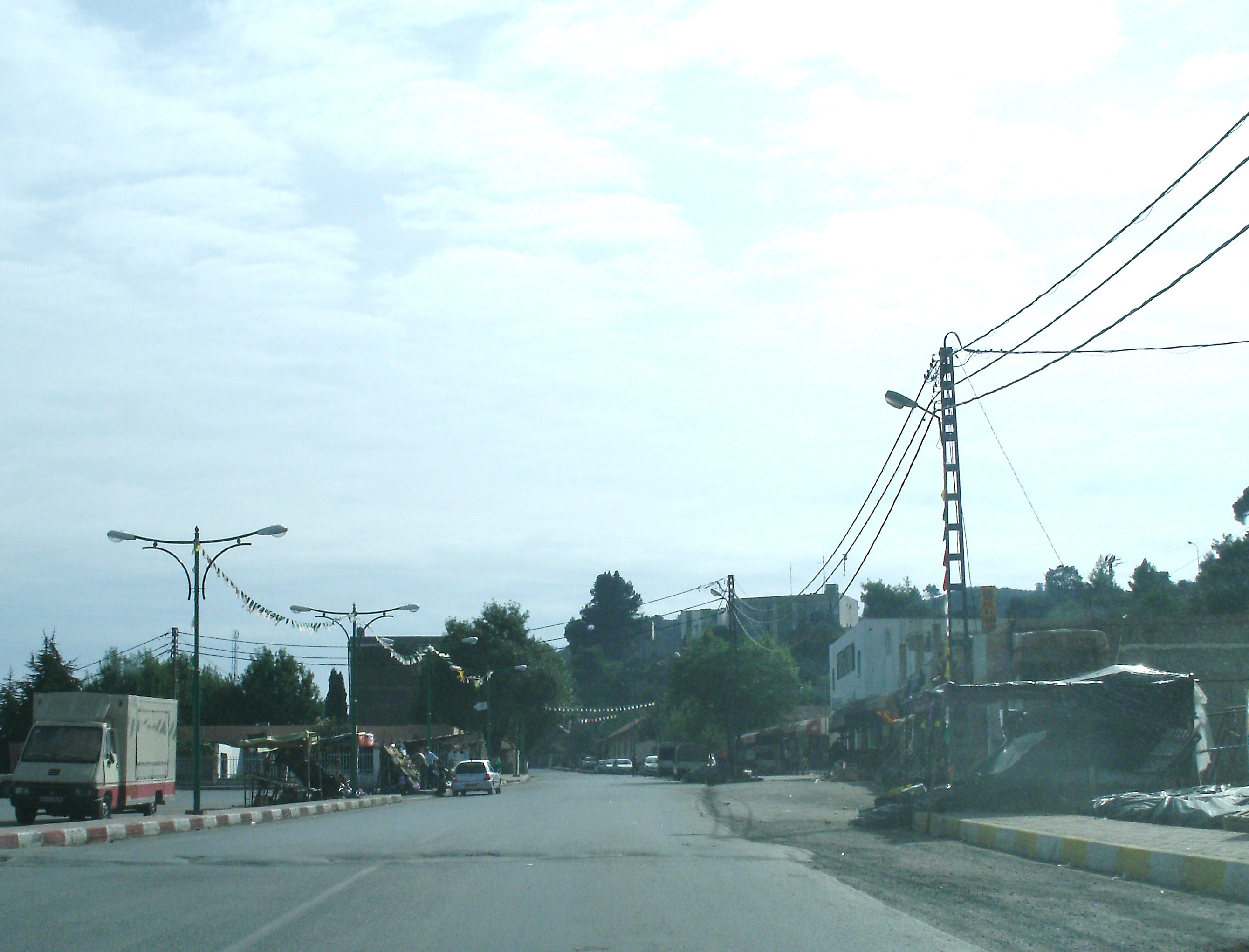

- Location within Algeria
- Coordinates: 36.4693243°N 3.2994336°E
- Country: Algeria
- Province: Médéa Province
- District: Tablat District

Population (1998)
  - Total: 5,019
- Time zone: UTC+1 (CET)

Deux Bassins is a town and commune in Médéa Province, Algeria. According to the 1998 census, it has a population of 5,019.
