= 2010 Bordj Menaïel bombing =

Car bomb Terrorist Attack on 21 September 2010 in Bordj Menaïel

Coordinates: 36.6350702°N 3.5914615°E

- Boumerdès Province highlighted within Algeria
- Location: (Algeria) Bordj Menaïel, Boumerdès Province
- Date: September 21, 2010
- Attack type: Bomb
- Deaths: 2
- Injuries: 3
- Perpetrator: Al-Qaeda Organization in the Islamic Maghreb

On September 21, 2010, a bomb was detonated against the patrol of the Algerian police in the town of Bordj Menaïel, Boumerdès Province, Algeria, killing 2 and injuring 3. Al-Qaeda in the Islamic Maghreb is suspected as being responsible.

== See also ==
- Terrorist bombings in Algeria
- List of terrorist incidents, 2010
