= Kef Lakhdar =

- Commune and town
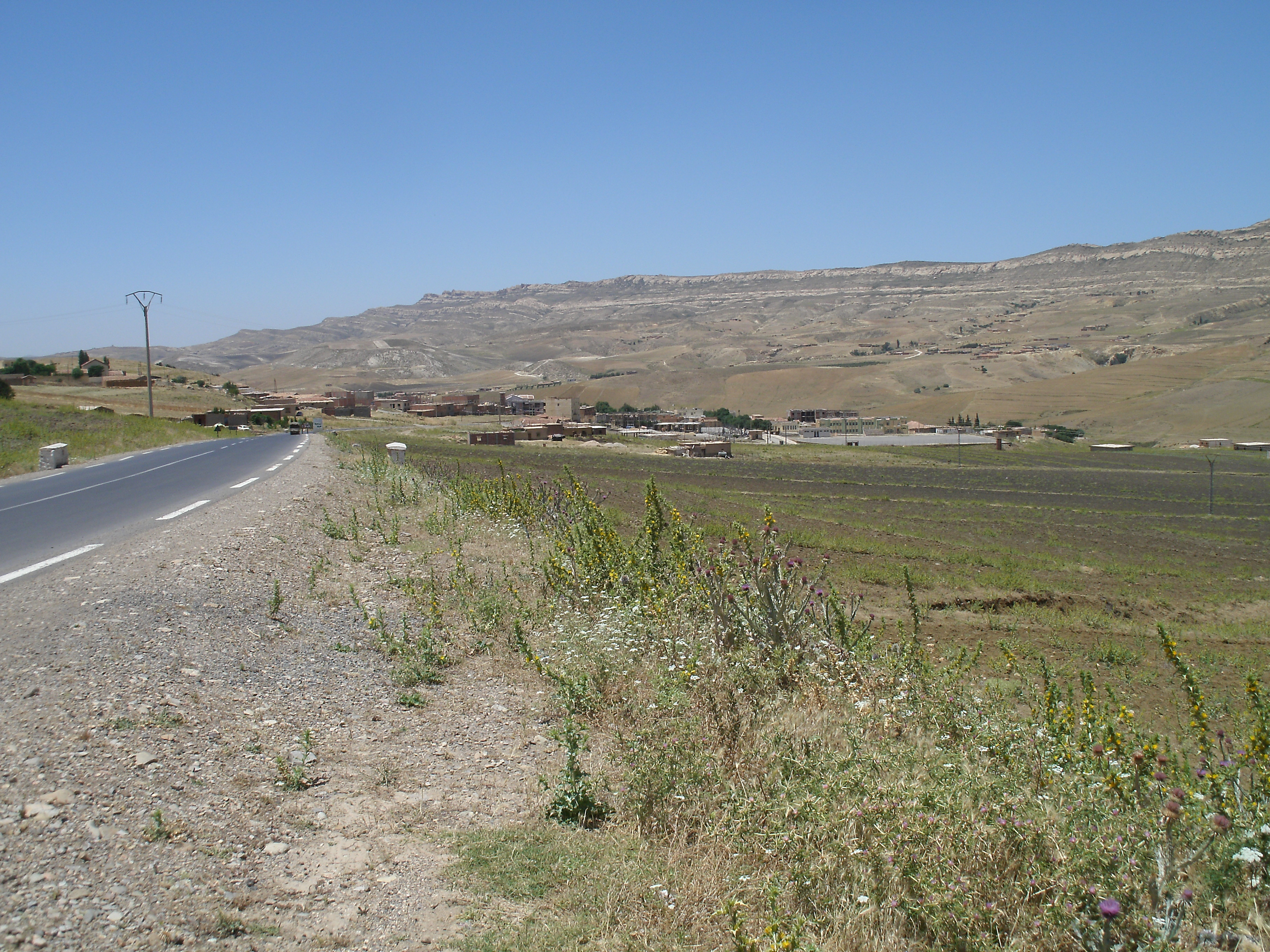

- Location within Algeria
- Coordinates: 35°55′24″N 3°17′15″E
- Country: Algeria
- Province: Médéa Province

Area
  - Total: 41.70 sq mi (107.99 km^{2})

Population (2008)
  - Total: 4,403
- Time zone: UTC+1 (CET)

Kef Lakhdar is a commune in Médéa Province, Algeria. In April 2008 it had a census population of 4403.

It is located in the north-central part of the country, a short distance south of the coast of the Mediterranean Sea and the country's capital, Algiers.
