= Achir =

Ancient city

Achir / Ashir
- أشير / Acir (Berber languages)
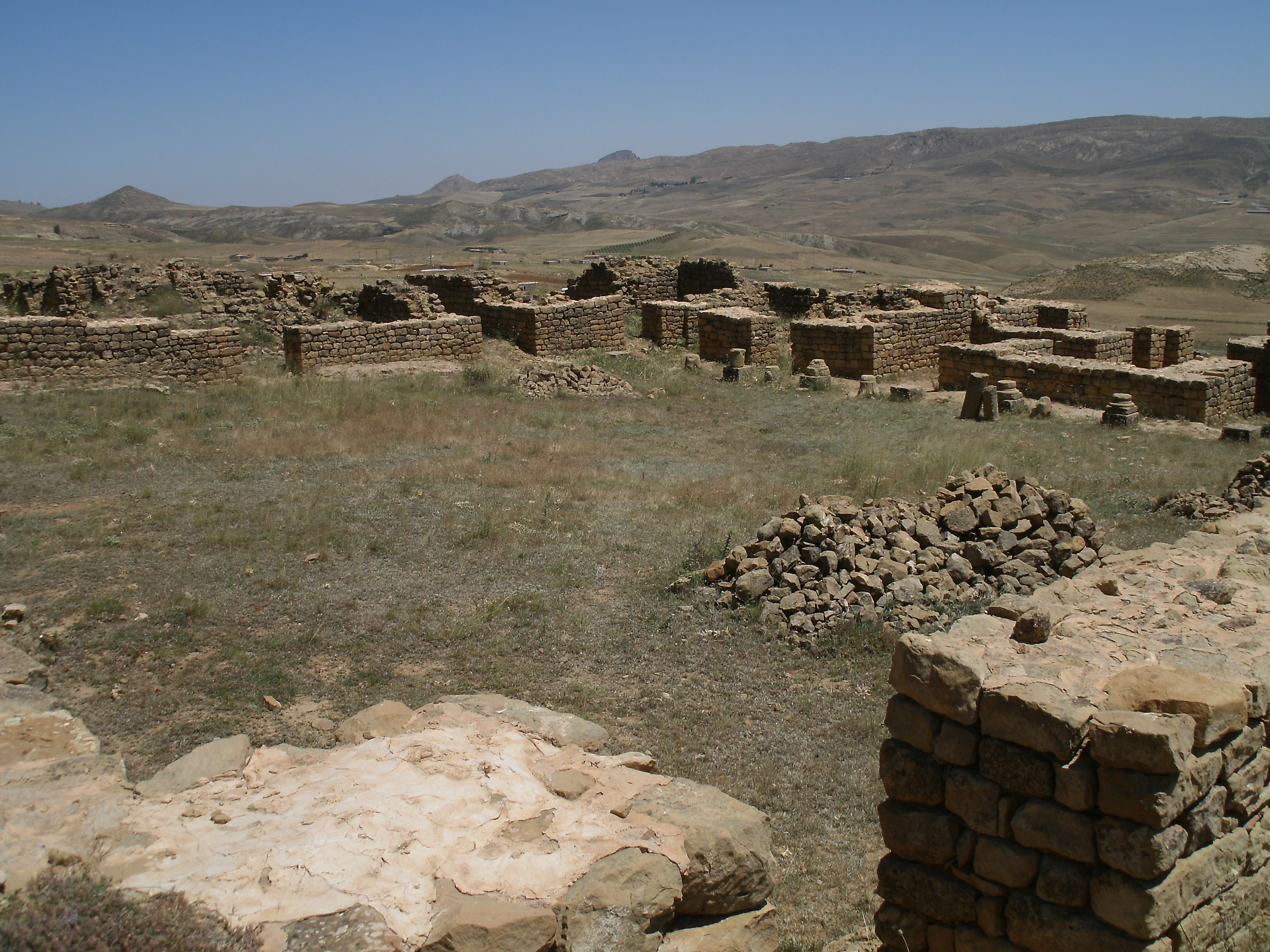
- View of courtyard of the Zirid palace
- Interactive map of Achir / Ashir
- 35°56′42″N 3°17′05.1″E
- Type: Fortified palace city
- Periods: Zirid
- Location: Kef Lakhdar, Algeria
- Region: Médéa

History
- Built: 935/6

Site notes
- Elevation: 1,400 m (4,600 ft)

Achir or Ashir (Amazigh: Acir) is a medieval Amazigh (Berber) city in Algeria, first capital of the Berber dynasty of the Zirids, which ruled under Fatimid suzerainty in the 10th–11th centuries. It is located at an altitude of 4,593 feet in the Titteri Mountains, in the current Algerian commune of Kef Lakhdar (Wilaya of Médéa).

The city is mentioned by Ibn Khaldun, who indicates that Mount Tetri is the kingdom of the Zirids, in which the ruins of Achir are located. Archaeological excavations have determined the existence of two Zirid sites in this area.

== History ==
The eponymous of the Berber Sanhaja dynasty, Ziri ibn Menad, who inherited the domination over Ifriqya, had been the Fatimid faithful and active lieutenant. In their struggles against Abu Yazid's soldiers and against the Zenetas, who dominated west of Tiaret, his interventions had been decisive. Thus, the Fatimid Caliph al-Qaim had authorized him to affirm his young power by the construction, in 935–36, of a capital that served as a stronghold and store on the slopes of Jebel Lakhdar at Ain Boucif.

The French historian Georges Marçais, who researched the remains of the Zirid constructions on the spot, showed that they reveal the progress of the founder of the dynasty.

Achir quickly gained importance. Situated in an ideal geographical position for a capital, on the natural border separating the plains of the western Tell from the Kabyle mountains of the east, he commanded the road that climbed the coast, following the ridges, and watched over the nomads of the plain. His rise received the encouragement of the Fatimid Caliph. Ziri brought people from other towns, perhaps also undesirables who were not safe elsewhere, and then surrounded it with thick walls. At the beginning of the eleventh century, Al Bakri reports that 'it is ensured that in the whole region there is no place that is stronger, more difficult to take and more likely to discourage the enemy, because ten men are sufficient to defend it.

An impregnable place, but also a place of active exchanges between Tell and the steppe, an intellectual center where forensic scientists and scholars flocked, Achir was truly a capital with Ziri as sovereign who commanded the most formidable contingents, watched over the central Maghreb from the top of his belvedere and minted coins in his name.

Achir was the heart of Sanhajian power. Thus, when the Caliph's sudden success made the Zirids masters of Ifriqiya, they abandoned their capital only with regret. It was little by little that the emirs took their families to the new capital, loosened the bonds that attached them to Achir and made their former domain a march entrusted to their relatives, until the day it escaped them. The Zirid success in the new capital was a source of great regret.

When the Fatimid Caliph Al-Mu'izz left the Maghreb for Egypt in 972, he entrusted the administration of Ifriqya to Ziri's son Bologhin. This one leaves Achir to settle in Kairouan, but he will keep close links with Achir where his family will remain.

Later, Achir and his region will be entrusted to the Hammadids and when the Hammadids declare their independence from the Zirids, they will incorporate it, after the 1017 arrangement, into their domain. Achir will be much coveted and she will change masters several times.

In 1048, Yusuf Ibn Hammad takes it and plunders it; in 1076, the Zenatas occupy it. Retaken in 1101 by Tachfine ben Tinamer, the master of Tlemcen, the city was devastated,

It is rebuilt before being occupied again, this time by Ghazi al-Sanhaji (1184). From this period on, one does not hear any more about Achir, which, in any case, has lost its role as capital for several years already.

== The archaeological site ==
According to Lucien Golvin, a French academic who undertook excavations on the site in 1954, Achir is composed of two distinct cities. Achir or Yachir, the capital of Ziri and Benia, built later by his son Bologhine, 2 km further south.

Achir Gallery
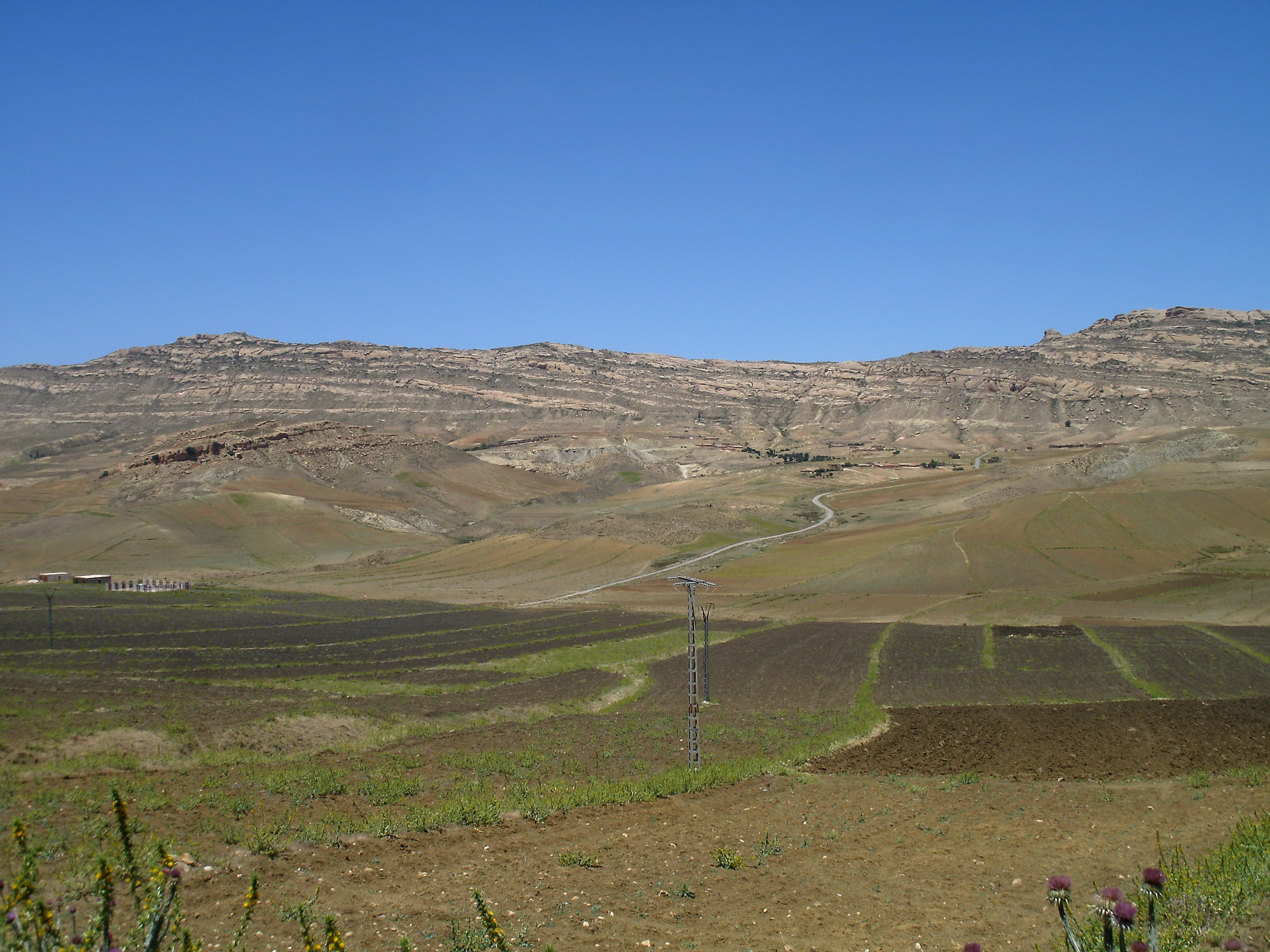
Kef Lakhdar, the archaeological site of Yashir

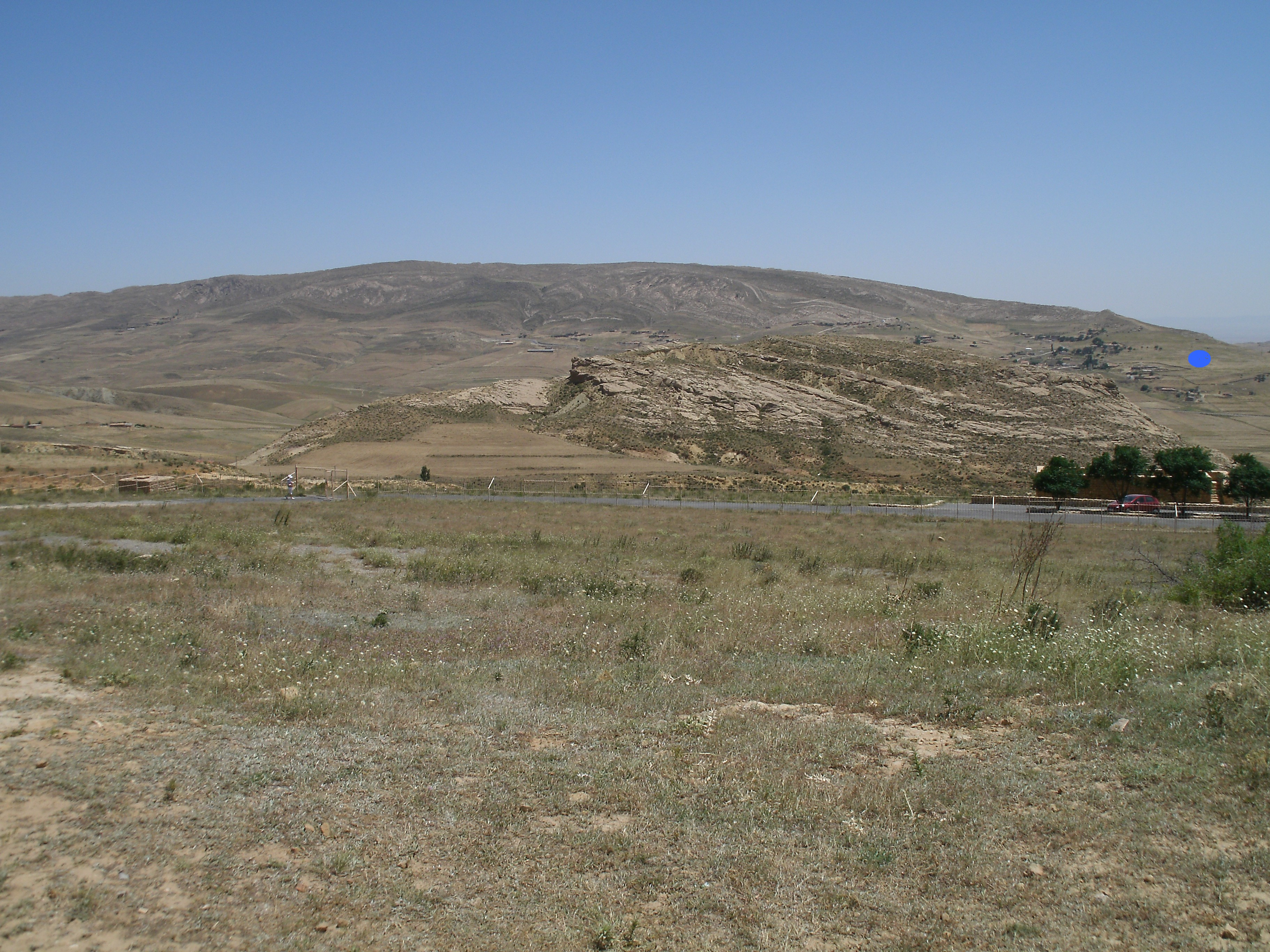
Pointed in blue, the site of Benia seen from Yashir

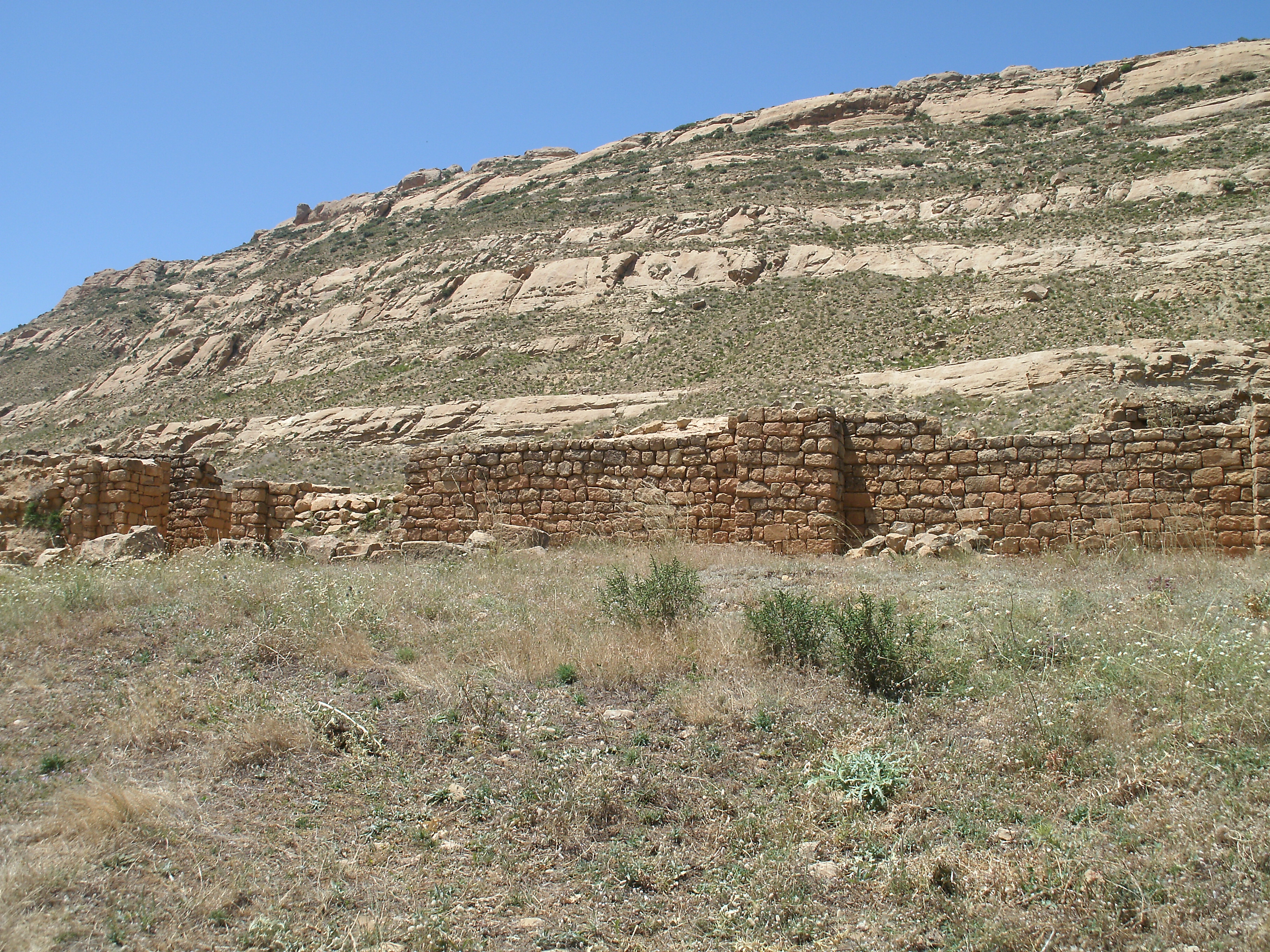
Ziri's palace in Achir

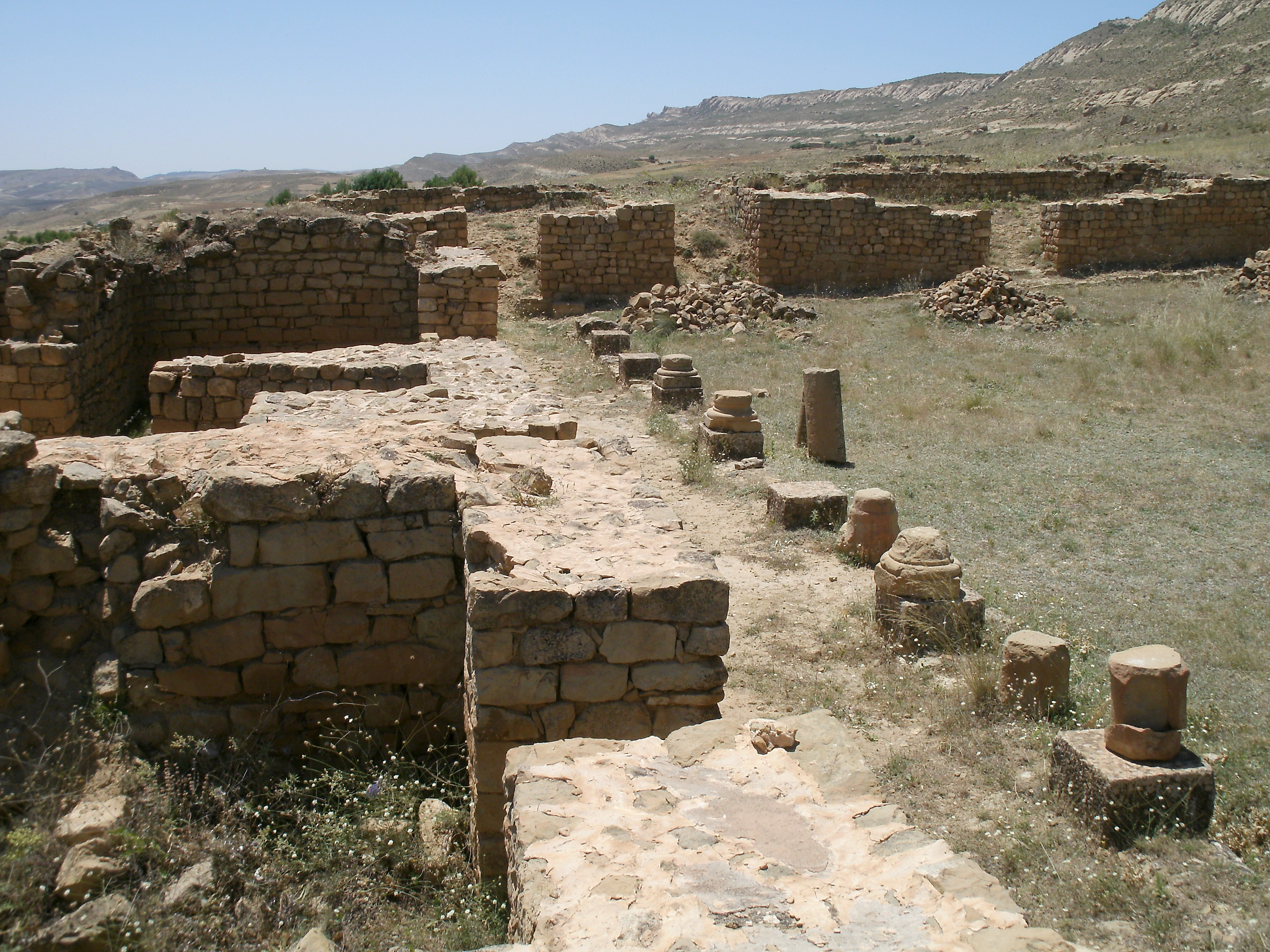
Ziri's palace in Achir

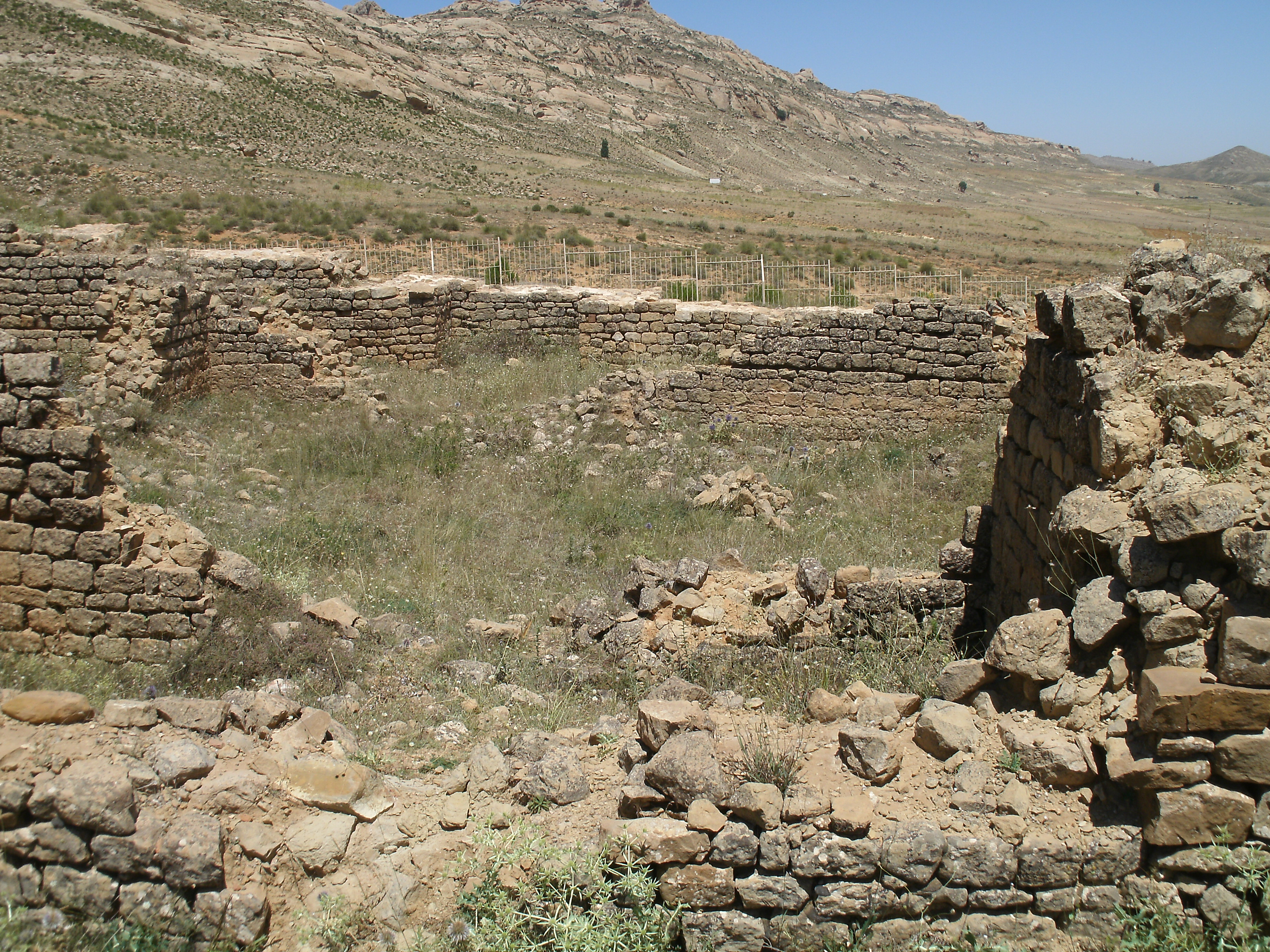
East court

=== Description of the site by Chabassière, 1869 ===
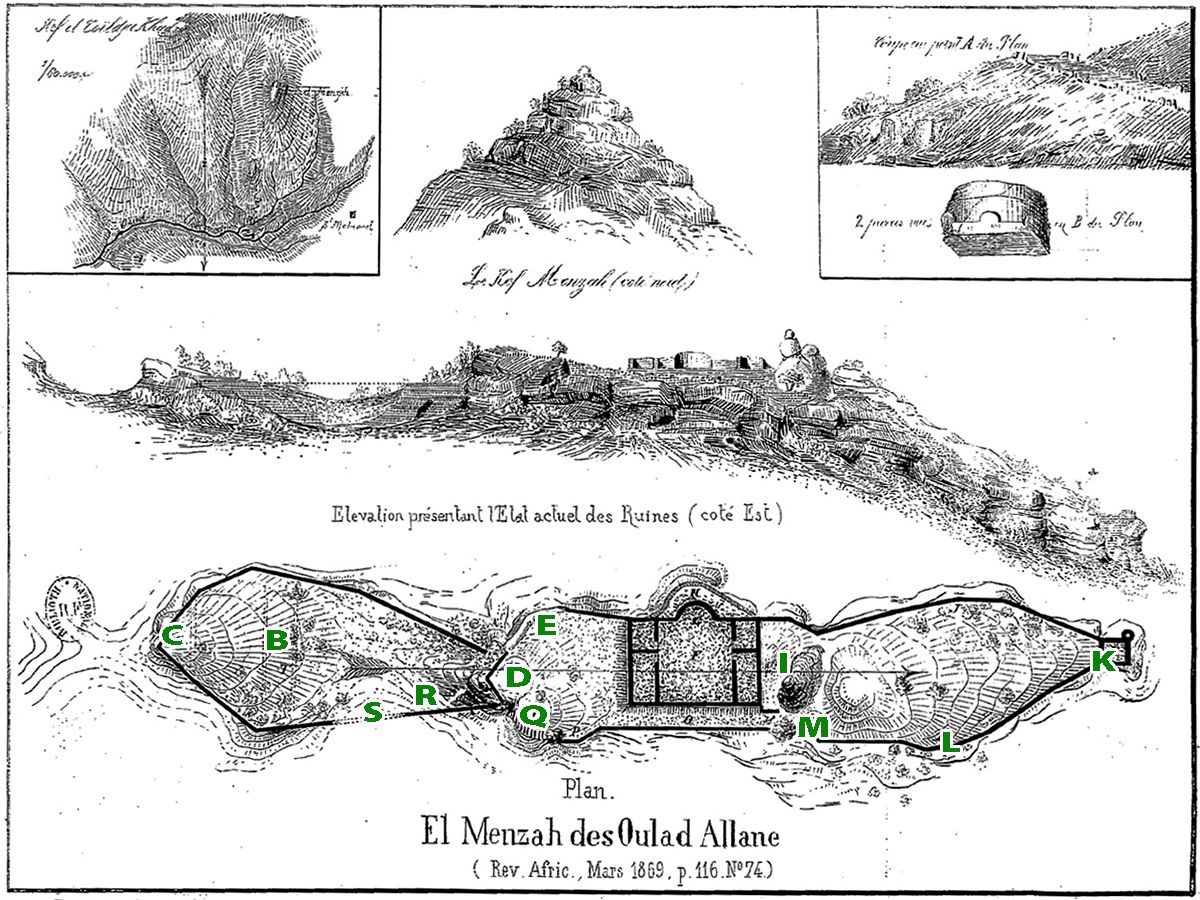
Plan of the Achir site in 1869

According to Chabassière's 1869 description of the site, the name attributed by the natives of the Oulad Alêne (Aghalik des Douaïr) to the ruins in question is El-Menza. At the summit of Kef el-Akhdar, at an altitude of around 1,500 m, there were ruins that could only be reached by an impassable path leading from the dechra El-Hadj Ouel Ness, between the Oued el-Mezieb and the Chabet bou Djemel and Hadjar Sebah mountains.

From the place called El-Menzah, the view extends over the Douaïr, Enfatah, Ouled Maref, Abid, Rebaïa, Ouled Ahmed ben Youssef, all the Béni Sliman, Ouled Zenim, Djouad, Dira and finally the Adaoura, covering a horizon of around one hundred kilometres. Only 440 metres separate point C from the summit of Le Kef, which itself dominates the entire south.

The position is remarkable and exceptional; the precipices, home to numerous wild boars and hyenas, give this site an undeniably picturesque character. The austerity and isolation of the ruins add to the value of the immense panorama visible from all sides. Large boulders, joined together by low masonry, form the natural enclosure of the military establishment, the shape and details of which will be briefly sketched out, leaving it to the reader's own knowledge to interpret the true function of these ruins, which unfortunately have not been researched.

The only access to the ruins, which can be gained using hands and feet, is at point S, an opening left open after the destruction of the surrounding wall, where time has accumulated demolition debris covered by a compact mass of earth, dotted with undergrowth. The first thing to note is that the base of the construction, at the foot of the rocks supporting it, contains a large quantity of pottery debris and is regularly ploughed by wild boar. It is also remarkable that the only significant stone finds were made at point B on the plan.

This is the southernmost part of the first apparent enclosure, and represents the end of a bastion in which the remains of transverse walls pierce the ground in three parallel places; this bastion, completely closed off at D by a rocky mass, originally carved into a staircase, was closed off to the east by the immense wall R (1.60 m wide at the top, and approximately 2.30 m wide at the base), partly destroyed as we said earlier. At one southern end of the bastion of the second enclosure, the masonry foundation ceases to be visible and is replaced on the rock by a chiselled recess 1.25 m wide and approximately 12 m long, the same width as the walls at their top.

The building measures 13 m in length from east to west, with annexes each measuring 3.80 m in length, and the walls are 1.15 m thick. Two dividing walls and the doors shown on the plan complete the figure, which is closed off to the east by a niche or dome with a radius of 3 m (either because time has destroyed them, or because man has changed their layout, he has found no trace of doors giving access to the outside).

A sort of counter-enclosure formed 5 metres below the level of the building closes off this part of the construction on the top of the rocky ridge, the sinuous shape of which follows the same ridge to its northern end. At point K, which seems to have been used as a cistern to collect water and snow from the upper part (second enclosure), whose surface area is no less than 2,360 square metres, the wall then returns to the east-south side, at L and M, where, under a three-trunked oak tree, the Arabs made an excavation that they were unable to continue, but which was intended to allow them to enter under the enormous boulder I (which must have served as a lookout and still bears traces of sealing), it also seems to cover an underground passage or another cistern whose completely blocked entrance would be between the two walls still standing at the north-east corner of the building.

A perfectly regular wall would continue the line of defence as far as the small redan on which a stunted oak spreads its thin trunk, its branches gnawed by the goats of the neighbouring douars. At point Q, as at point E of the enclosure, the rock bears no traces of construction, only here it differs in that eight steps measuring 1.70 m in length by 30 cm in width and 15 cm in depth have been dug into it, no doubt to enable the animals to walk safely on this slippery, bare rock. As mentioned above, the construction is made of mortar and cut sandstone rubble, small units averaging 20 x 20 cm.

Excavations would be easy to carry out and would undoubtedly provide the key to the enigma that we have been trying to guess, as the ground leaves very little trace of these types of demolition, the small dimensions of which are easily erased and are very quickly covered by earth and later by scrub.
