= 2008 Zemmouri bombing =

Suicide bombing in 2008 in Algeria

Coordinates: 36.716°N 3.666°E

- Boumerdès Province highlighted within Algeria
- Location: (Algeria) Zemmouri, Boumerdès Province
- Date: August 9, 2008
- Attack type: Suicide Bombing
- Deaths: 8
- Injuries: 19
- Perpetrator: Al-Qaeda Organization in the Islamic Maghreb

The 2008 Zemmouri bombing occurred on August 9, 2008 when a suicide bomber drove and detonated a vehicle laden with explosives into the headquarters of the Gendarmerie Nationale in the town of Zemmouri, Boumerdès Province, Algeria killing 8 and injuring 19. The Al-Qaeda Organization in the Islamic Maghreb is suspected as being responsible.

== See also ==
- Terrorist bombings in Algeria
- List of terrorist incidents, 2008
