= Ibn Hammad =

Ibn Hammad is an Arabic patronymic, carried by:

- Qaid ibn Hammad (d. 1054)
- Ismail ibn Hammad al-Jawhari (d. 1002/8)
- Ibn Hammad (historian) (d. 1230), author of a Fatimid history

== See also ==
- Hammadid
