= Great Mosque of Béjaïa =

Former mosque in Béjaïa, Algeria

Great Mosque of Béjaia
- الجامع الكبير بجاية
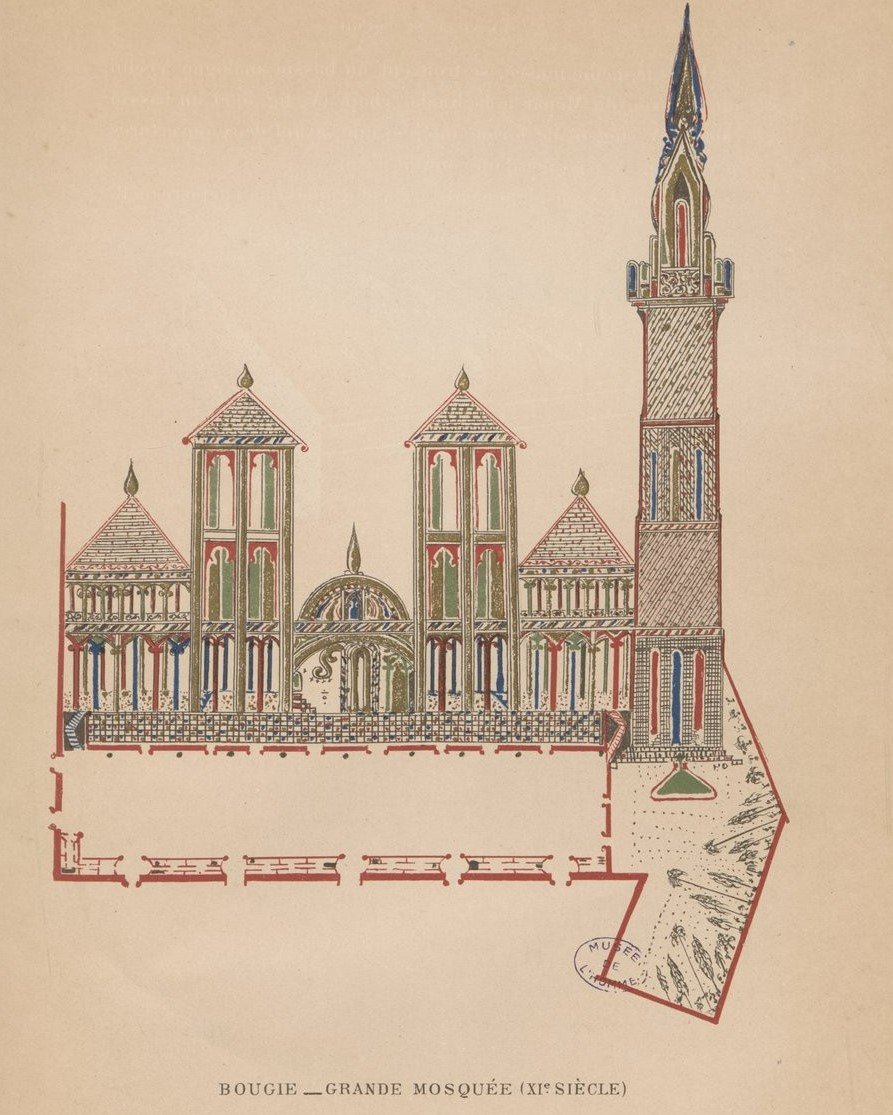
- Illustration of the former mosque from a 12th-century manuscript

- Location of the former mosque in Algeria

Religion
- Affiliation: Sunni Islam (former)
- Rite: Maliki
- Ecclesiastical or organizational status: Mosque (1100–1510)
- Status: Demolished

Location
- Location: Béjaia
- Country: Algeria
- Interactive map of Great Mosque of Béjaia
- Coordinates: 36°45′04″N 05°03′51″E

Architecture
- Type: Islamic architecture
- Style: Hammadid; Moorish
- Founder: Al-Mansur ibn al-Nasir
- Completed: 1100 CE
- Construction cost: 86.000 mithqal
- Destroyed: 1510 CE (during the Capture of Béjaïa

Specifications
- Minaret: 1
- Minaret height: 56 m (184 ft)
- Materials: Bricks; marble; timber

The Great Mosque of Bejaia (Arabic: الجامع الكبير بجاية, romanized: el-Jemaa al-Kabīr libéjaïa) or Al-Mansuriyah Mosque (Arabic: جامع المنصورية, romanized: el-Jemaa al-Mansuriyah) was a major historical mosque in Béjaïa, Algeria. It was built during the Hammadid Emirate around the year 1100 CE, under the reign of Al-Mansur ibn al-Nasir. The mosque was destroyed by the Spanish after they took the city in 1510.

== Background ==
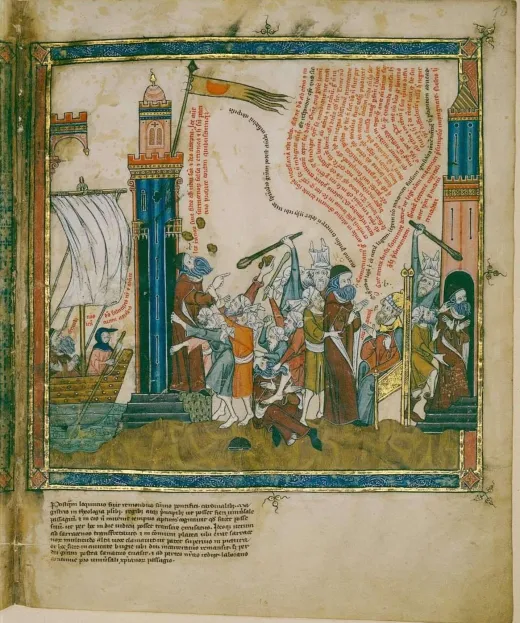
Representation of the theologian Ramon Llull in his travels to Béjaïa, the minaret of the Great Mosque is depicted in the background of the illustration.

Nothing remains of the Hammadid mosques in Béjaïa, including the Great Mosque, the Mosque of Rehane, and the Mosque of Natain (Arabic: مسجد النطاعين). However, Féraud's book about Béjaïa provides a detailed description of the Great Mosque. as well as in a book by Commander de Beylié. These sources mention that a calligrapher from Béjaïa named Al-Bajawi transferred a 12th-century manuscript in 1866. According to this manuscript, Prince Al-Mansur Al-Hamadi completed the construction of the Pearl Palace in 1100/484 and converted it into a mosque. He then placed two Monolithic columns within the palace, which were discovered inside an ancient, damaged church. Despite interest from the Pope in Rome to purchase them, Al-Mansur declined. Al-Bajawi also noted that the Hammadid Emir constructed a dome and a minaret near the garden well, with impressive dimensions. The manuscript further reports that Al-Mansur spent 86 thousand golden mithqals on the mosque. Over time, the mosque became a center for scientific and religious education, attracting numerous scholars and ulama. Its renown continued during the Almohad era but ended in the 16th century when it was demolished by the Spanish fleet during their conquest of the city.

== Architecture ==
Algerian historian and archaeologist Dr. Rachid Bourouiba provided a comprehensive overview of the mosque's architectural features sourced from multiple references, including a 12th-century manuscript attributed to an author named Ibn Hammad, who is believed to be a descendant of the Almohad Caliph Abd al-Mumin, The description continues as follows:

The length of this mosque was 220 arms and its width was 150 arms, with a facade adorned with seventeen ribbed vault and a large door on its right and left sides. Marble slabs ornamented with inscriptions were found beside this main door, and the mosque had 22 other doors, one of which led to a prayer room designated for women, guarded by an elderly sheikh. Inside the mosque, there were 32 marble pillars and a grand dome. The floor of the mosque was paved with marble, its walls covered with zellij, and adorned with Quranic inscriptions. The minaret of this mosque was 60 arms high, with a square base measuring 20 arms, which makes he minaret 56 metres tall with a 18 metres wide. This minaret had two doors, one on the east side and the other on the south side, with the doors of the minaret and their columns and their shafts made of engraved marble. The mihrab and its surroundings were made of white marble, with a circular band in the middle engraved with verses from the Quran. The walls of the mosque were adorned with inscriptions and beautiful paintings from bottom to top, including writings that were easily readable, and the columns were also elegantly decorated. The number of columns in this mosque amounted to 412 columns, with a length of 222 arms and a width of 150 arms. At the forefront of the mosque, we find a vestibule with its door near the pulpit. In front of the arcades, the courtyard was paved for about fifteen arms, and in the hall separated from the mosque, there are two hundred large pillars arranged amidst small domes and numerous fountains flowing from the walls.

== See also ==
- Islam in Algeria
- List of mosques in Algeria
