= Hammadid capture of Fez =

1062 military expedition

Hammadid Capture of Fez
Date	1062
Location	Fez (in present-day Morocco)
Result	Hammadid victory

Belligerents
Hammadids	Maghrawa

Commanders and leaders
Buluggin ibn Muhammad	Unknown

Strength
Unknown	Unknown

Casualties and losses
Unknown	A number of captives taken

The Hammadids captured Fez in 1062, during Buluggin ibn Muhammad's campaign against the Maghrawa tribe that controlled parts of present-day Morocco and western Algeria.

== Background ==
Buluggin ibn Muhammad had just coordinated a campaign in Biskra where he restored Hammadid authority.

== Capture ==
Buluggin decided to lead an expedition against Fez, which was under the control of local Maghrawa (Zenata) rulers. He then captured Fez.

== Aftermath ==
Buluggin spent several months in Fez before leaving, taking with him some of the inhabitants of the city as captives. His paternal cousin Nasir ibn Alnas, who wished to avenge the death of his sister, took the opportunity to assassinate Buluggin during his return journey and then succeeded him as Hammadid ruler. Fez returned afterwards to the control of local Maghrawa, until it was besieged by the Almoravids for many years during the 1060s and eventually fell to them in 1069–70.
