= Banu Khurasan =

Banu Khurasan بني خراسان
- c. 1058–1159
- Capital: Tunis
- Common languages: Arabic, Berber
- Religion: Islam (Sunni)
- Government: Monarchy
- Emir
  - 1058-1095: Abd al-Haqq ibn Abd al-Aziz ibn Khurasan
  - 1149-1159: Abd Allah ibn Abd al-Aziz
- Historical era: Middle Ages
  - Established: c. 1058
  - Disestablished: 1159
Preceded by	Succeeded by
Zirid dynasty	Almohad Caliphate

The Banu Khurasan (Arabic: بنو خراسان, romanized: Banu Khurasan) or Khurasanid dynasty was a Sunni Muslim dynasty that ruled an independent principality centered on Tunis, in present-day Tunisia, between approximately 1058 and 1159. They rose to power following the political vacuum left behind by the Zirids when they abandoned Kairouan for Mahdia in 1057, in the face of pressure from the Banu Hilal. While de facto independent, they continued to recognize the suzerainty of either Zirids or the Hammadids for much of this period. Their rule was interrupted by Hammadid annexation from 1128 and 1148, and their authority came to a final end with the Almohad conquest in 1159.

== History ==
The Khurasanid dynasty was founded during the 11th century. In 1057, the Zirid dynasty sultan Al-Mu'izz ibn Badis abandoned his capital at Kairouan and retreated to Mahdia on the coast. In doing so, he left both Kairouan and Tunis to local leaders. According to Ibn Khaldun, Tunis was then raided by the Banu Hilal (the Arab tribes that had recently arrived in the region) and the inhabitants banished their own governor, a mercenary named Qahrun ibn Ghannush, for his incompetent administration. In search of protection and leadership, the city turned for help to the emir of the Hammadid dynasty, al-Nasir, and requested that he appoint a governor. Initially, al-Nasir allowed the local Tunisian elites to propose a candidate, but ultimately he declined their selection and appointed Abd al-Haqq ibn Abd al-Aziz ibn Khurasan, a Sanhaja Berber leader.

Abd al-Haqq ruled a de facto independent principality that would be governed by his family for almost a century. He ruled with the title of shaykh only and with the assistance of a council of shaykhs, the mashyakha, which was probably composed of the city's elites. He made peace with the Banu Hilal by negotiating an agreement that included regular tribute payments to the tribes. He formally recognized al-Nasir as sovereign until 1067, when he was forced to recognize the authority of the Zirid emir Tamim ibn al-Mu'izz, following a fourteen-month siege. His son, 'Abd al-'Aziz (r. 1095–1105), continued to recognize Zirid suzerainty. 'Abd al-'Aziz's brother, Abu al-Ṭahir Isma'il, succeeded him in 1105 but only ruled a short period.

The fourth Khurasanid ruler, Ahmad ibn 'Abd al-'Aziz (r. 1107–1128), was considered by Ibn Khaldun to be the most remarkable of his family. He built ramparts around Tunis to defend it and secured guarantees of safe passage for travellers from the Banu Hilal. He also disposed of the mashyakha council, exiling some of them to Mahdia, and renegotiated the city's agreement with the Arab tribes. He nonetheless continued to formally recognize the sovereignty of more powerful rulers. He first recognized the Zirids, who besieged the city again in 1116–7, and then recognized the Hammadids again in 1120–1.

Under Khurasanid rule, the small independent kingdom enjoyed some prosperity and security, though its resources were limited. Relative to the other cities of Ifriqiya, Tunis grew in importance during this period. The construction of the Khurasanid dynastic mausoleum, still extant today and known as Sidi Bu Khrisan, was completed in July 1093, according to its foundation inscription. In addition to new city walls, Ahmad ibn 'Abd al-'Aziz also built a palace (qasr) and a mosque, now known as the Ksar Mosque, to the southwest of the old Zaytuna Mosque. This in turn shifted the center of power within the city and developed its administrative capabilities, a process which culminated in its later role as the capital of Ifriqiya.

In 1128, Ahmad was deposed and the principality was annexed to the Hammadid kingdom. Tunis was controlled by Hammadid governors until it recovered its independence in 1148. After Hammadid rule, there was a brief interregnum during which the people of Tunis elected a new leader, the qadi Abu Muhammad 'Abd al-Mu'min. With the support of the other elites, Abu Muhammad invited Muhriz ibn Riyah, the Riyahid amir (of the Banu Riyah tribe), to rule the city as king. However, when Muhriz was greeted outside the city, the common people protested and the proposal failed. Abu Muhammad was chased out of the city and followed Muhriz back to La Malga.

Khurasanid rule was restored when Abu Bakr ibn Ismail was smuggled over the city walls at night in a basket. Seven months later he was drowned by his nephew Abd Allah ibn Abd al-Aziz, who succeeded him. While Tunis was not conquered by the Normans, some historians have suggested that the Banu Khurasan at this time were granted authority to govern by Roger II of Sicily.

In 1159, the last Khurasanid ruler, Ali ibn Ahmad ibn Abd al-Aziz, was ousted by the Almohad Caliphate and sent into exile. The Almohads annexed the whole Ifriqiya to its empire, putting an end to Khurasanid rule.

== List of rulers of the Khurasanid dynasty ==
- 1059–1095: Abd al-Haqq ibn Abd al-Aziz ibn Khurasan
- 1095–1105: Abd al-Aziz ibn Abd al-Haqq
- 1105–1107: Abu al-Tahir Isma'il ibn Abd al-Haqq
- 1107–1128: Ahmad ibn Abd al-Aziz
- 1128–1148: Hammadid annexation
- 1148: Abu Muhammad Abd al-Mu'min ibn Abu al-Hasan (elected, not belonging to the Dynasty)
- 1148–1148/1149?: Abu Bakr ibn Isma'il ibn Abd al-Haqq (ruled for seven months)
- 1149–1159: Abd Allah ibn Abd al-Aziz
- 1159: Ali ibn Ahmad ibn Abd al-Aziz (ruled for five months)
- 1159: Almohad conquest
