= Abd al-Aziz ibn Mansur =

Sultan of the Hammadid Sultanate
- Reign: 27 July 1105 – 1121
- Predecessor: Badis ibn Mansur
- Successor: Yahya ibn Abd al-Aziz
- Born: 1088
- Died: 1121 (aged 32–33)
- Dynasty: Hammadid dynasty
- Religion: Islam

Abd al-Aziz ibn Mansur (Arabic: عبدالعزيز بن منصور الحمادي), also known as Al-Maymun (the Happy) was the ruler of the Hammadids from 27 July 1105 to 1121.

== Biography ==
Abd al-Aziz was born on the day his father Al-Mansur ibn al-Nasir ascended the throne. He succeeded his brutal brother Badis in 1105. Badis had dismissed his brother from his governorship of Algiers and was relegated to Jijel. Abd al-Aziz then returned from Jijel to Bejaia to exercise power.

Abd Al-Aziz married a daughter of Makhoukh, a famous chieftain of the Beni-Ouamannou (a Zenata tribe). Their marriage renewed the peace with the Beni-Ouamannou.

Preceded by Badis ibn Mansur	Hammadid ruler 1104 - 1121	Succeeded by Yahya ibn Abd al-Aziz
