= Buluggin ibn Muhammad =

- Hammadid dirham produced during the rule of Buluggin ibn Muhammed

Sultan of the Hammadid Sultanate
- Reign: June 1055 – 11 July 1062
- Predecessor: Muhsin ibn Qaid
- Successor: Nasir ibn Alnas
- Born: unknown date
- Died: 11 July 1062; Tessala, Algeria
- Dynasty: Hammadid dynasty
- Father: Muhammad ibn Hammad
- Religion: Islam

Buluggin ibn Muhammad (Arabic: بلكين بن محمد بن حماد) (died 11 July 1062) was the ruler of the Hammadids from 1055 to 1062. He led an army into Morocco against the Almoravids and briefly captured Fes.

== Reign ==
Buluggin succeeded his cousin Muhsin ibn Qaid, whom he assassinated in June 1055. After killing Muhsin, Buluggin killed his vizier and the governor of Biskra, Ja'far ibn Abi Rumman, because he doubted his loyalty. This assassination provoked a revolt of the population of Biskra. The Sanhajian Army, commanded by Khalaf ibn Abi Haydara, took the city by storm. The main Biskrians, probably all Banu Rumman, were sent to Qal'a where Buluggin had them all killed.

Buluggin's brother, Muqatil ibn Muhammad, was married to his cousin, Namirt bint Alnas. Muqatil was already deceased, even though the exact date of his death remains unknown (Al-Hadi Roger suggested it happened before the Moroccan campaign). Buluggin believed that his cousin had killed his brother and killed her, which prompted a revenge murder by Namirt's brother Nasir ibn Alnas.

=== Expedition against the Almoravids ===
In 14 Feb or 14 Mar 1062, Buluggin took the road to Morocco, where the Almoravid leader Yusuf ibn Tashufin was shaking the Zanatian Empire. Buluggin took advantage of the fact that the Zanatian emir al-Fatuh had moved away from his capital, Fez, to enter. Buluggin does not seem to have met the Almoravids. Yusuf ibn Tashfin, no doubt aware of the possibility of lightning incursions from the east and anxious to reserve his forces—still insufficient to subjugate the Masmuda—retreated to the Sahara.

On his withdrawal, Buluggin was assassinated by an agent of his successor Nasir ibn Alnas in Tessala, south of Oran, on the first day of the month of Rajab 454 AH / 11 July 1062.

Preceded by Muhsin ibn Qaid	Hammadid ruler 1055 – 1062	Succeeded by Nasir ibn Alnas
