= Badis ibn Mansur (Hammadid) =

Sultan of the Hammadid Sultanate
- Reign: January 1105 - 27 July 1105
- Predecessor: Al-Mansur ibn al-Nasir
- Successor: Abd al-Aziz ibn Mansur
- Born: Abu Ma'ad Badis Nasir al-Dawla unknown date
- Died: 27 July 1105
- Dynasty: Hammadid dynasty
- Father: al-Mansur ibn Buluggin (father)
- Religion: Islam

Badis ibn Mansur (Arabic: باديس بن منصور) was briefly the ruler of the Hammadids in 1105.

Badis was described as an extremely violent leader despite his short reign (7 months); He is said to be extremely reckless and to be a sort of "Mini Caligula". He expropriated and killed his father's vizier, Abd Al Karim bin Sulayman. When he left the Qal'a Beni Hammad to live in Bejaia, he disgraced the governor of the latter. He also exiled his brother Abd al-Aziz, then governor of Algiers, to Jijel. He died on 13 Dhu al Qa'da 498 AH, corresponding to 27 July 1105.

Preceded by Al-Mansur ibn al-Nasir	Hammadid ruler 1105	Succeeded by Abd al-Aziz ibn Mansur
