= Yahya ibn Abd al-Aziz =

Sultan of the Hammadid Sultanate
- Reign: 1121 – 10 November 1152
- Predecessor: Abd al-Aziz ibn Mansur
- Successor: Almohad conquest
- Born: unknown date
- Died: 1162
- Dynasty: Hammadid dynasty
- Religion: Islam

Yahya ibn Abd al-Aziz (Arabic: يحيى بن عبدالعزيز الحمادي), known fully as Abu Zakariyya Yahya ibn al-Aziz bi-Llah ibn al-Mansur ibn al-Nasir, was the last ruler of the Hammadids from 1121 to 10 November 1152, when the dynasty's rule was ended by the Almohads and Yahya presented his submission.

Yahya ibn Abd al-Aziz is described as a virtuous and magnanimous prince, but of weak character and obsessed with women and hunting; he would surround himself with old men and women which would entertain him. His sisters Taqsut, Umm Mallal and Shiblah would dress themselves as brides to make their brother laugh. Then he would fall asleep and when he woke up, would directly go hunt.
