= Muhsin ibn Qaid =

- Sharaf al-Dawla
- Reign: October 1054 – June 1055
- Predecessor: Qaid ibn Hammad
- Successor: Buluggin ibn Muhammad
- Died: June 1055
- Issue: Ouighlan ibn Muhsin; Abu Yakni ibn Muhsin
- House: Hammadid dynasty
- Father: Qaid ibn Hammad
- Religion: Shia Islam

Muhsin ibn Qaid, (Arabic: محسن إبن قيد) (Muhsin 'iibn Qayd) (died June 1055 / Rabi' Al Awwal 446 AH) was the ruler of the Hammadids for 9 months, from October 1054 to June 1055.

Preceded by Qaid ibn Hammad	Hammadid ruler 1054 – 1055	Succeeded by Buluggin ibn Muhammad
