= Ksar Mosque =

Mosque in Tunis, Tunisia

- Arabic: جامع القصر
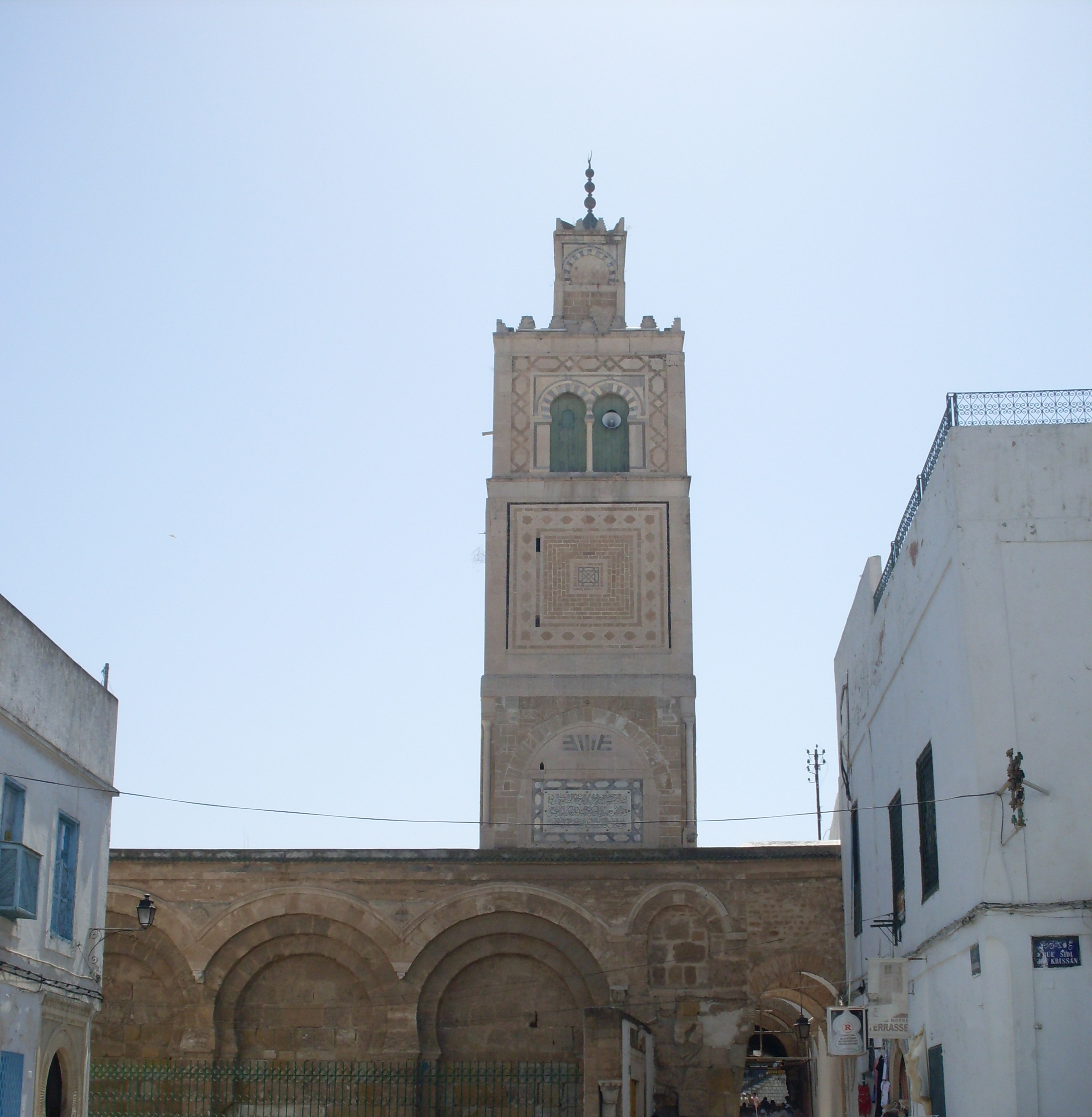

Religion
- Affiliation: Sunni Islam
- Status: Active

Location
- Location: Medina of Tunis, Tunis
- Country: Tunisia
- Interactive map of Ksar Mosque
- Coordinates: 36°47′43″N 10°10′11″E

Architecture
- Type: Mosque
- Style: Khurasanid
- Founder: Ahmad ibn Abd al-Aziz
- Established: 1106
- Minaret: 1

Ksar Mosque or Jemaâ Al Ksar (Arabic: جامع القصر), of the Hanafi rite, is a mosque in Tunis, Tunisia.

== History ==
Located in front of Dar Hussein (Bab Menara), it was built in the early 12th century. The mosque was originally built circa 1106 by Ahmad ibn 'Abd al-'Aziz, the leader of the Banu Khurasan who governed Tunis during this time. Near the mosque he also built a palace (qasr in Arabic).

Around 1598, it was attached to the Hanafi legal school by the Ottoman conquerors. The mosque has been restored many times since its founding. Its minaret was added in the 17th century.

== Structure ==
The mosque has had a lot of building work and renovation. The minaret was rebuilt in 1647/48, and decorated with marble and terra cotta glazed in a Moorish style, and its eastern facade is decorated with big bows and horseshoes in the Fatimid style.

Access to the mosque is through a door under a covered walkway that opens into a courtyard elevated above the prayer hall. It is surrounded by a portico with columns and capitals such as Turkish Prayer Hall which is topped by arches supported by ancient columns and capitals. At the back of the hall, the mihrab, of remarkable size, is semicircular with seven niches separated by pilasters. It is surmounted by a Fatimid style fluted half-dome.

== Gallery ==
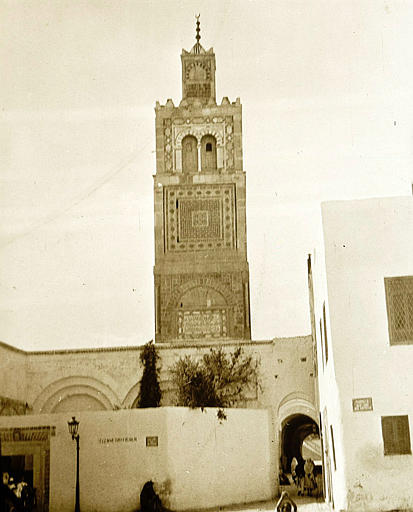
Ksar Mosque in 1913

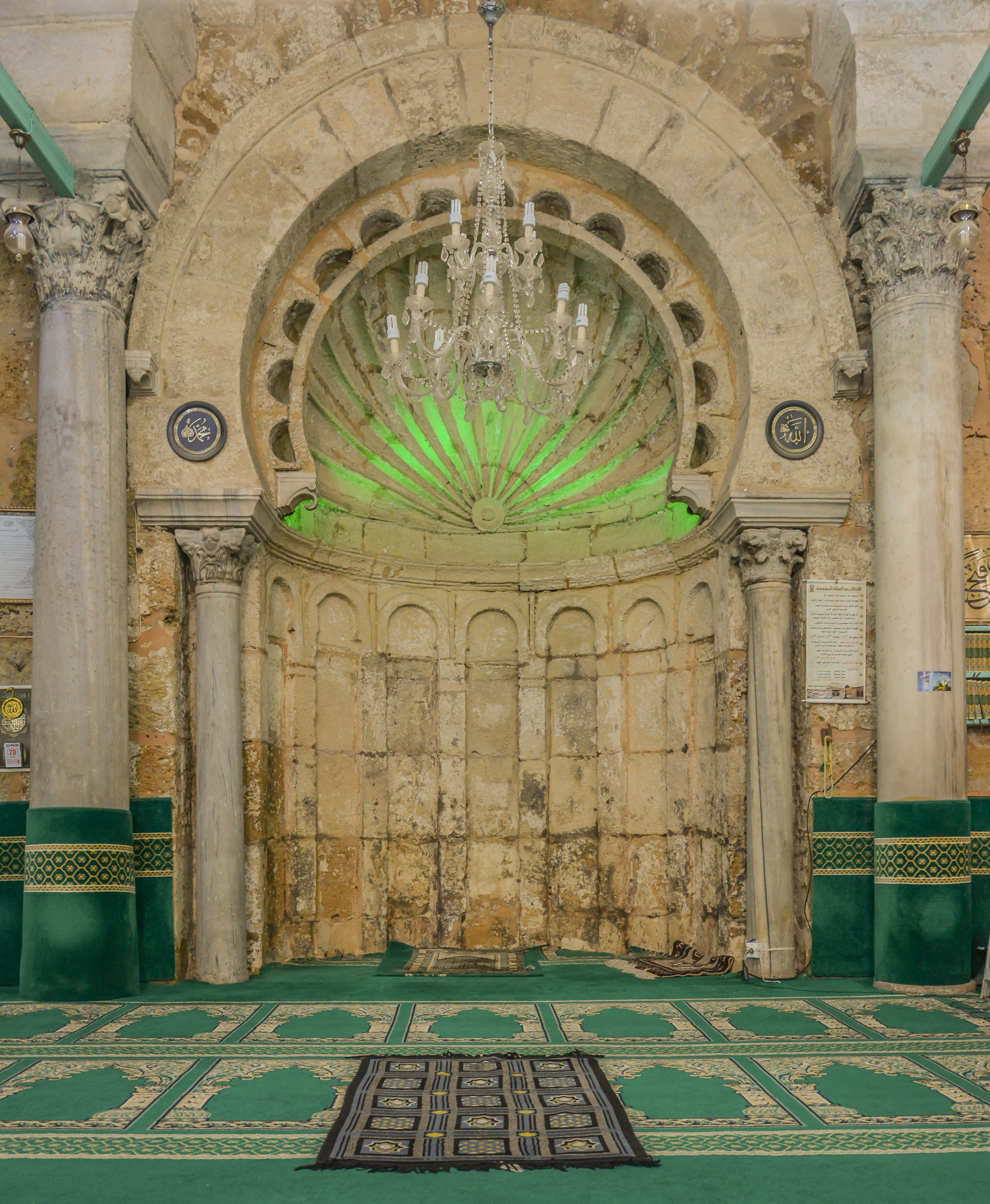
El Ksar's mosque Mihrab

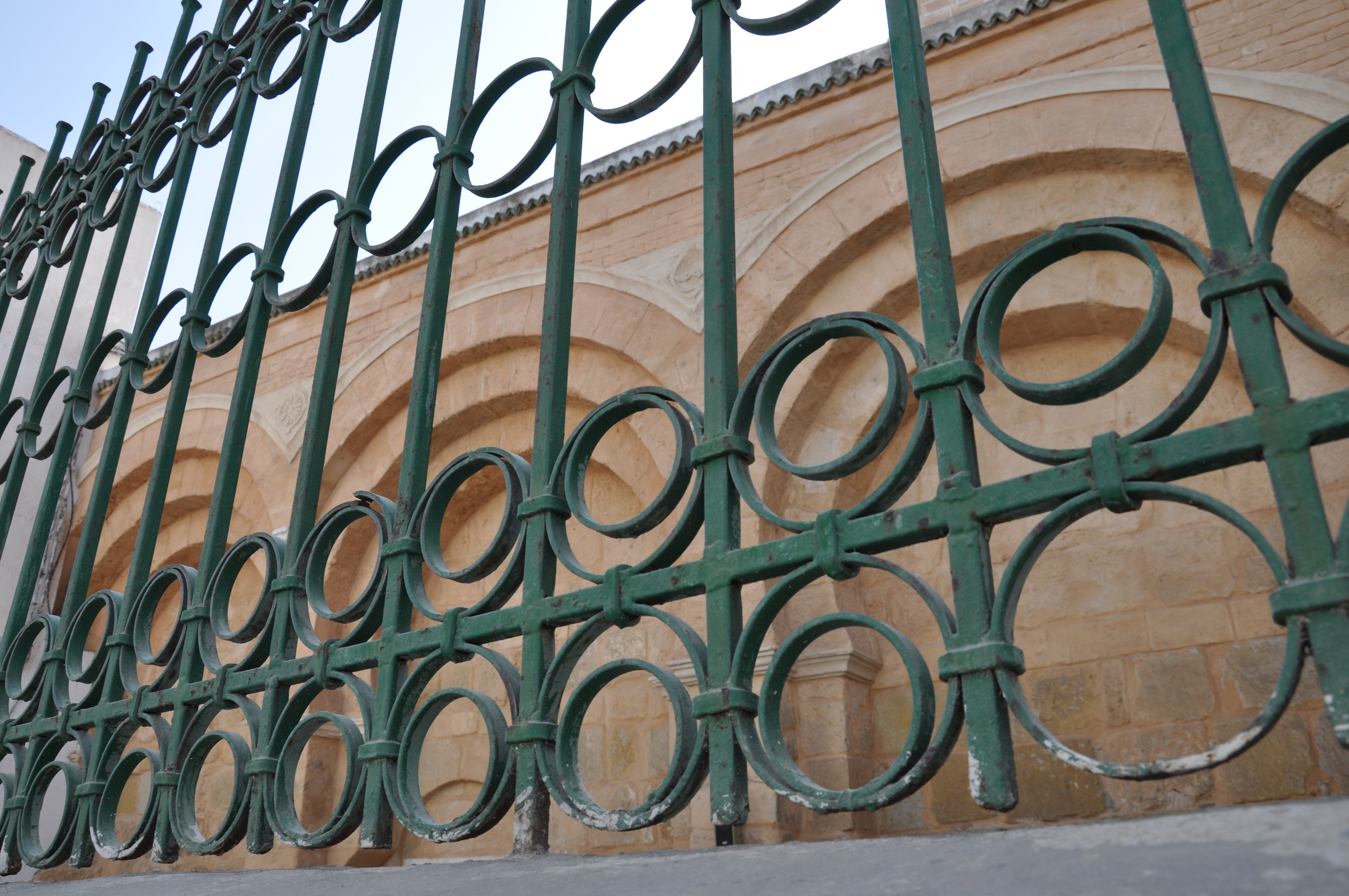
El Ksar mosque's facade

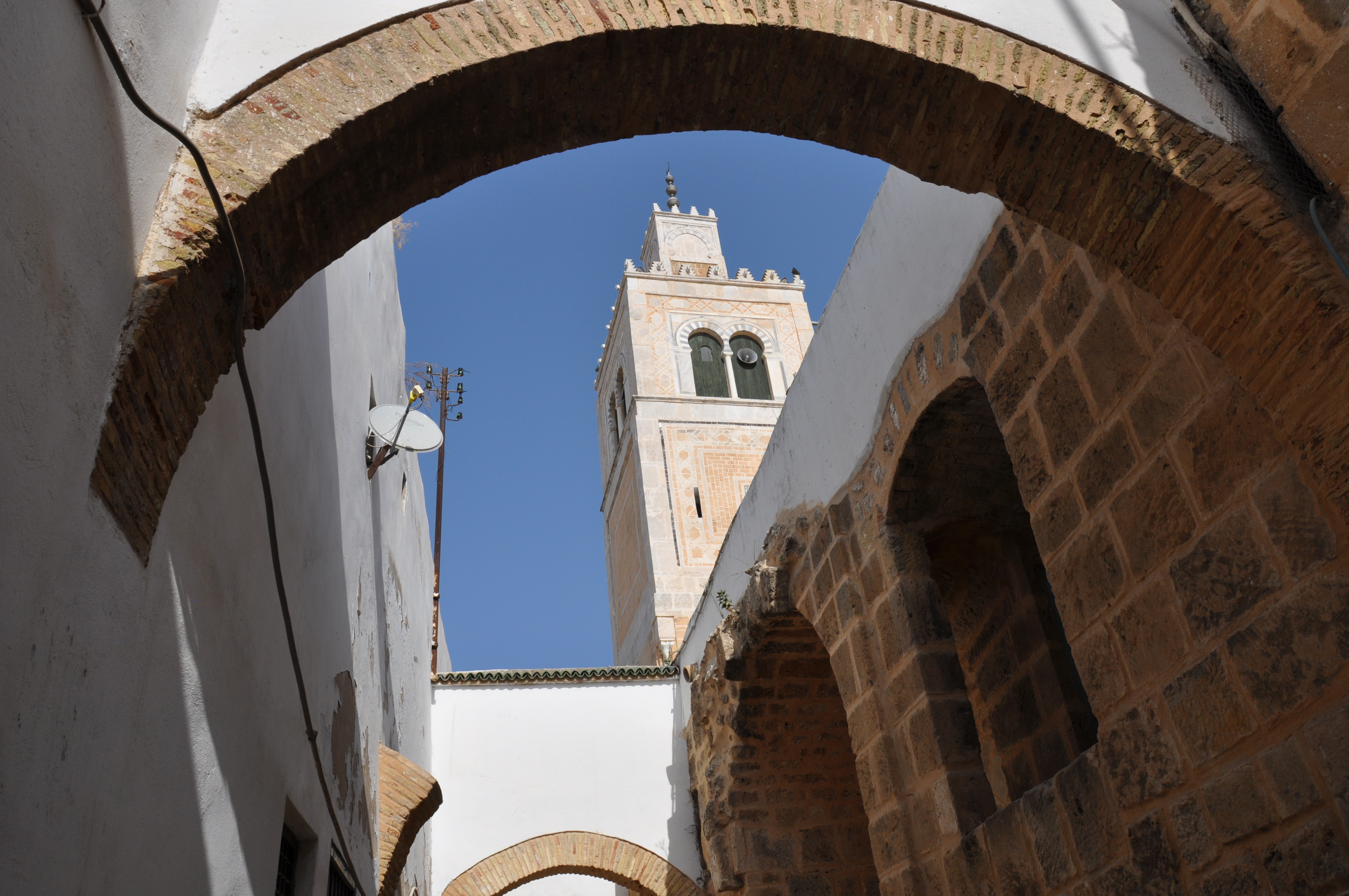
Mosque El Ksar's minaret

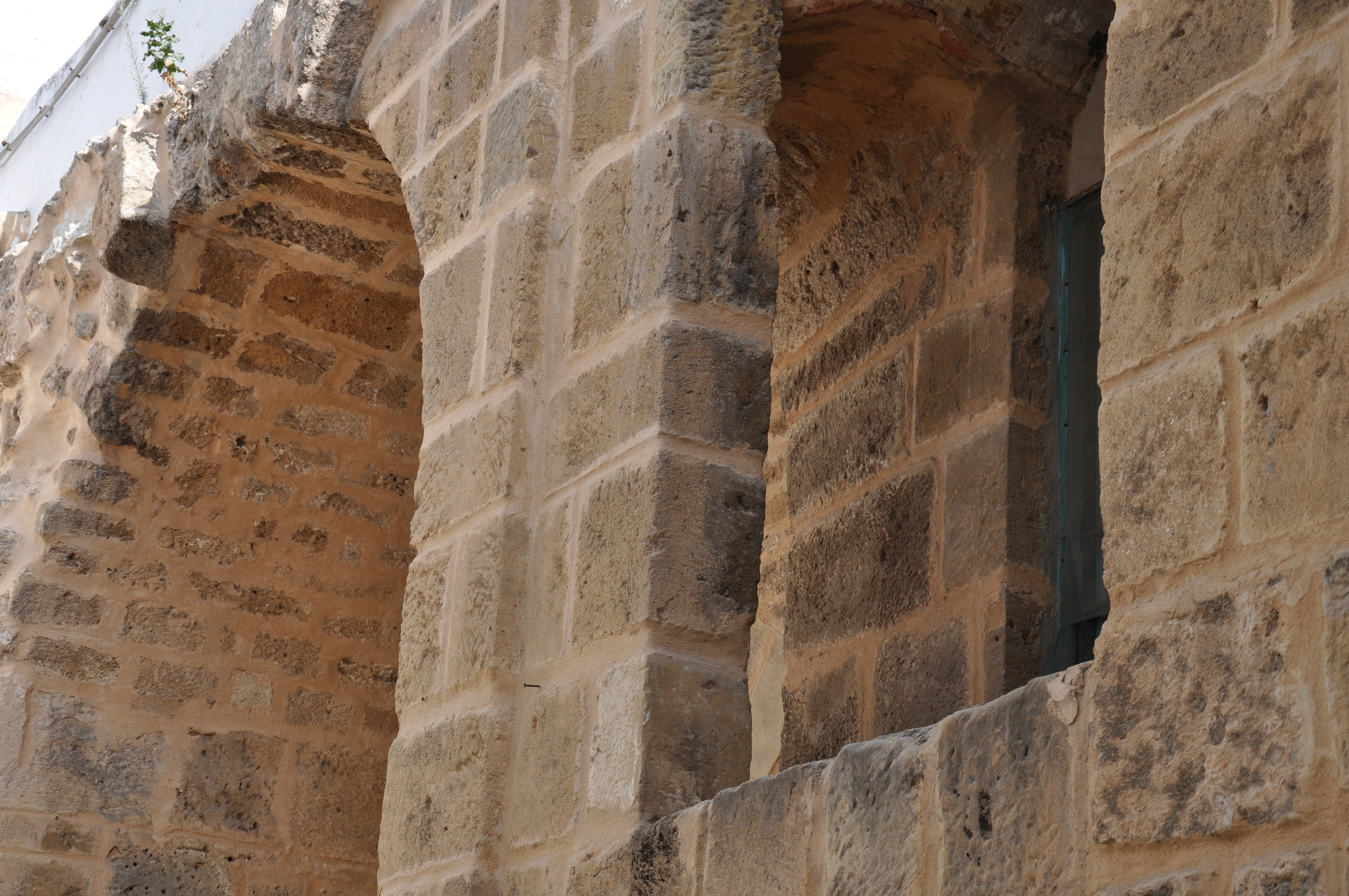
The mosque's arches

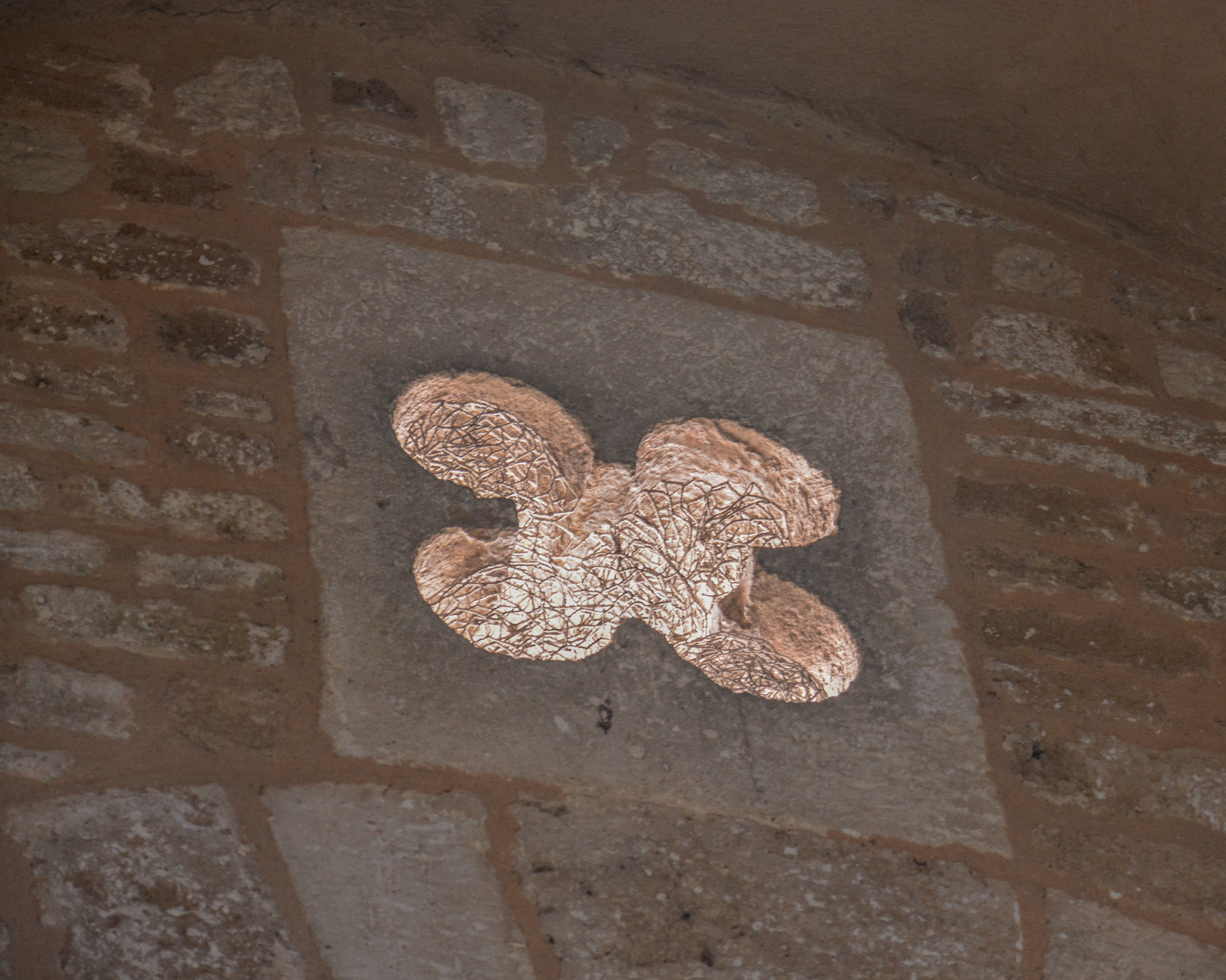
Detail of the wall

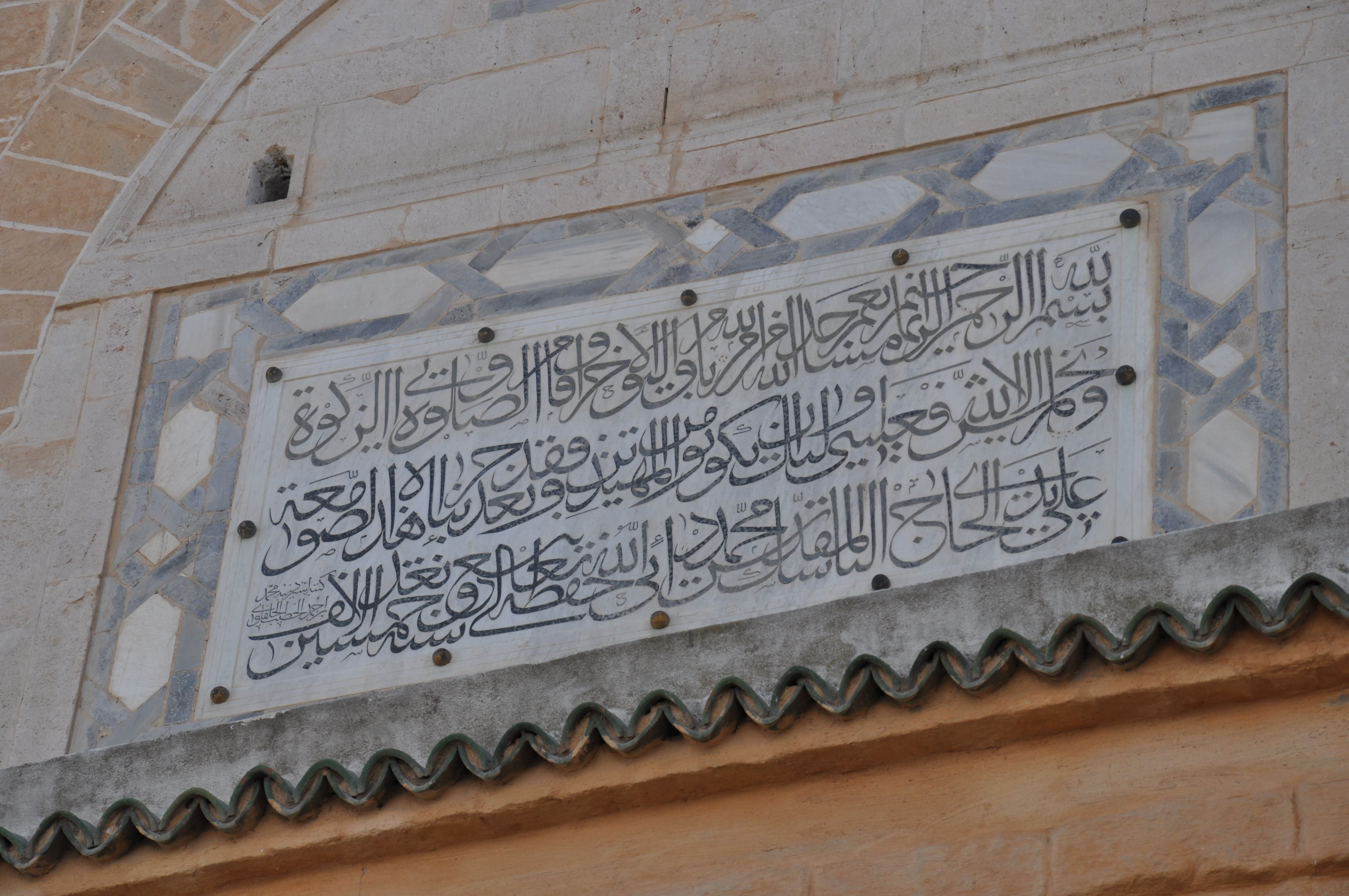
Building inscription on the minaret

== See also ==
- Islam in Tunisia
- List of mosques in Tunisia

== Bibliography ==
- Mohamed Masmoudi et Jamila Binous, Tunis. La ville et les monuments, Tunis, Cérès Productions, 1980, p. 80–81
