= Ibn Hammad (historian) =

Berber historian (1153/54–1230)

- ابن حماد
- Born: 1153; Qal'at Bani Hammad
- Died: 1230 (aged 76–77); Marrakesh
- Occupations: Historian, qadi, scholar
- Era: Post-classical history
- Notable work: Akhbar Muluk Bani Ubayd; Al-Nubadh al-Muhtaja fi Akhbar Muluk Sanhaja bi-Ifriqiya wa-Bajaia
- Arabic name
- Personal (Ism): Shams al-Dīn
- Patronymic (Nasab): Abu ʿAbd Allāh Muḥammad ibn ʿAlī ibn Ḥammād ibn ʿĪsā ibn ʿAbī Bakr al-Ṣanhāj̲ī
- Teknonymic (Kunya): ʾAbū ʿAbd Allāh
- Epithet (Laqab): Ibn Ḥamād

Abu ʿAbd Allāh Muḥammad ibn ʿAlī ibn Ḥammād ibn ʿĪsā ibn ʿAbī Bakr al-Ṣanhāj̲ī, known as Ibn Ḥammād (Arabic: ابن حماد) or Ibn Ḥamādu (1153/54–1230 / AH 548–628), was a medieval Berber qadi and historian, author of a chronicle on the Fatimid caliphs in the Maghreb, known as Akhbar muluk bani Ubayd wa-siratuhum ("account of the kings of the house of Ubaid and their deeds"), written in 1220 / AH 617. He was related to the Banu Hammad and a native of a village near their Qal'a.

== Editions ==
- Histoires des Rois Obaidides, ed. and trans. M. Vanderyheiden, Paris, 1927.
- Akhbar muluk Bani Ubayd wa-siratuhum: Tahlil li-tarikh al-Dawlah al-Fatimiyah min khilal masdar turathi , Dar al-Ulum, 1981, ISBN 978-977-286-267-2

== See also ==
- Muslim conquest of the Maghreb
