= Al-Mansur ibn al-Nasir =

- Dirham struck in his name

Sultan of the Hammadid Sultanate
- Reign: 1088–1105
- Predecessor: Nasir ibn Alnas
- Successor: Badis ibn al-Mansur
- Born: unknown date
- Died: January 1105
- Dynasty: Hammadid dynasty
- Father: Nasir ibn Alnas
- Mother: Ballara bint Tamim
- Religion: Islam

Al-Mansur ibn al-Nasir (Arabic: المنصور بن الناصر) (died January 1105) was the sixth ruler of the Hammadids in Algeria (1088–1105).

== Biography ==
Al-Mansur ibn al-Nasir succeeded his father Nasir ibn Alnas in 1088. In 1090, he left the Kal'a (Beni Hammad Fort), the traditional capital of the Hammadids, to settle in Béjaïa (Bougie) with his troops and his court, which he considered less accessible to the Nomads. He left the region because of the destruction caused by the arrival of the Banu Hilal. His father had already prepared this transfer by transforming a fishing port into a city he calls An-Nasiriya but which was to assume the name of Bougie, the name of a tribe that inhabited this region. Al-Mansur built public buildings, palaces, a water distribution network and gardens in Bejaia. The Hammadid kingdom thus abandoned its nomadic origins and became sedentary. The Kal'a was not completely abandoned by al-Mansur and he even embellished it with a number of palaces. The Hammadids therefore had two capitals joined by a royal road at this time.

At Al-Mansur's accession to the throne, Balbar ibn Alnas, Al-Mansur's uncle and governor of Constantine, rebelled. Al Mansur sent him an army commanded by Abu Yakni ibn Muhsin to which he gave the control of Annaba and Constantine. Abu Yakni then captured Balbar and sent him to Qal'a Beni Hammad, and gave the command of Annaba to his brother Ouighlan. Several years later, in 1094 (487 AH), Abu Yakni rebelled in turn and formed a coalition against the Hammadid central government, composed of the Zirids, the Banu Hilal and the Almoravids. Abu Yakni tasked Ouighlan to go to Mahdia and offer Tamim ibn al-Mu'izz the possession of Annaba. Tamim accepted and Ouighlan came back to Annaba with Tamim's son Abu al Futuh. Ouighlan and Abu Yakni were rallying Arabs and were corresponding with the Almoravids. However Al-Mansur acted fast and took back Annaba after a 7-month long siege, all while taking prisoner Abu al Futuh who was sent to Qal'a Beni Hammad. Constantine was swiftly assieged and Abu Yakni fled to a Qal'a in the Aures. Abu Yakni had given control to an Athbajid chief, Sulaysal bin al Ahmar, who sold the city to the Hammadids. Abu Yakni was repeatedly attacking Constantine but he was assieged in his Qal'a, was captured and put to death.

== Bibliography ==
- Marçais, Georges. "al- Manṣūr". Encyclopaedia of Islam. Vol. 6 (2nd ed.).
- ibn Khaldun (1854). Histoire des Berbères et des dynasties musulmanes de l'Afrique Septentrionale. Vol. 2. Translated by William McGuckin de Slane. Alger: Imprimerie du Gouvernement.

Preceded by Nasir ibn Alnas	Hammadid ruler 1088–1104	Succeeded by Badis ibn al-Mansur
