= Qaid ibn Hammad =

Qaid ibn Hammad ibn Buluggin
- Sharaf al-Dawla
- Reign: August 1029 – October 1054
- Predecessor: Hammad ibn Buluggin
- Successor: Muhsin ibn Qaid
- Born: unknown date
- Died: October 1054
- Issue: Muhsin ibn Qaid; Ziri ibn Qaid
- Dynasty: Hammadid dynasty
- Father: Hammad ibn Buluggin
- Religion: Shia Islam

Qaid ibn Hammad ibn Buluggin (Arabic: قائد بن حماد بن بلكين), (Qayid bin Hammad bin bolowjin) was the second Hammadid ruler in what is now Algeria.

== Life ==
He succeeded his father Hammad ibn Buluggin in 1029. He named his brother Yusuf as governor of North Africa, and another brother, Ouighlan, governor of Hamza (modern day Bouira). In 1038 he was attacked by Hammama, lord of Fes but pushed him back after which Hammama requested peace and declared his submission to the Hammadids. Four years later, he signed a treaty of peace with the Zirid Al-Mu'izz ibn Badis, who had moved against him from Kairouan.

In 1048, when al-Muizz declared himself subject of the Abbasid caliph of Baghdad, Qaid confirmed his allegiance to the Fatimid caliphs of Egypt, obtaining by caliph Ma'ad al-Mustansir Billah the title of Sharaf al-Dawla.

He died in October 1054, and was succeeded by his son Muhsin ibn Qaid.
