= Tessala =

- Commune and town
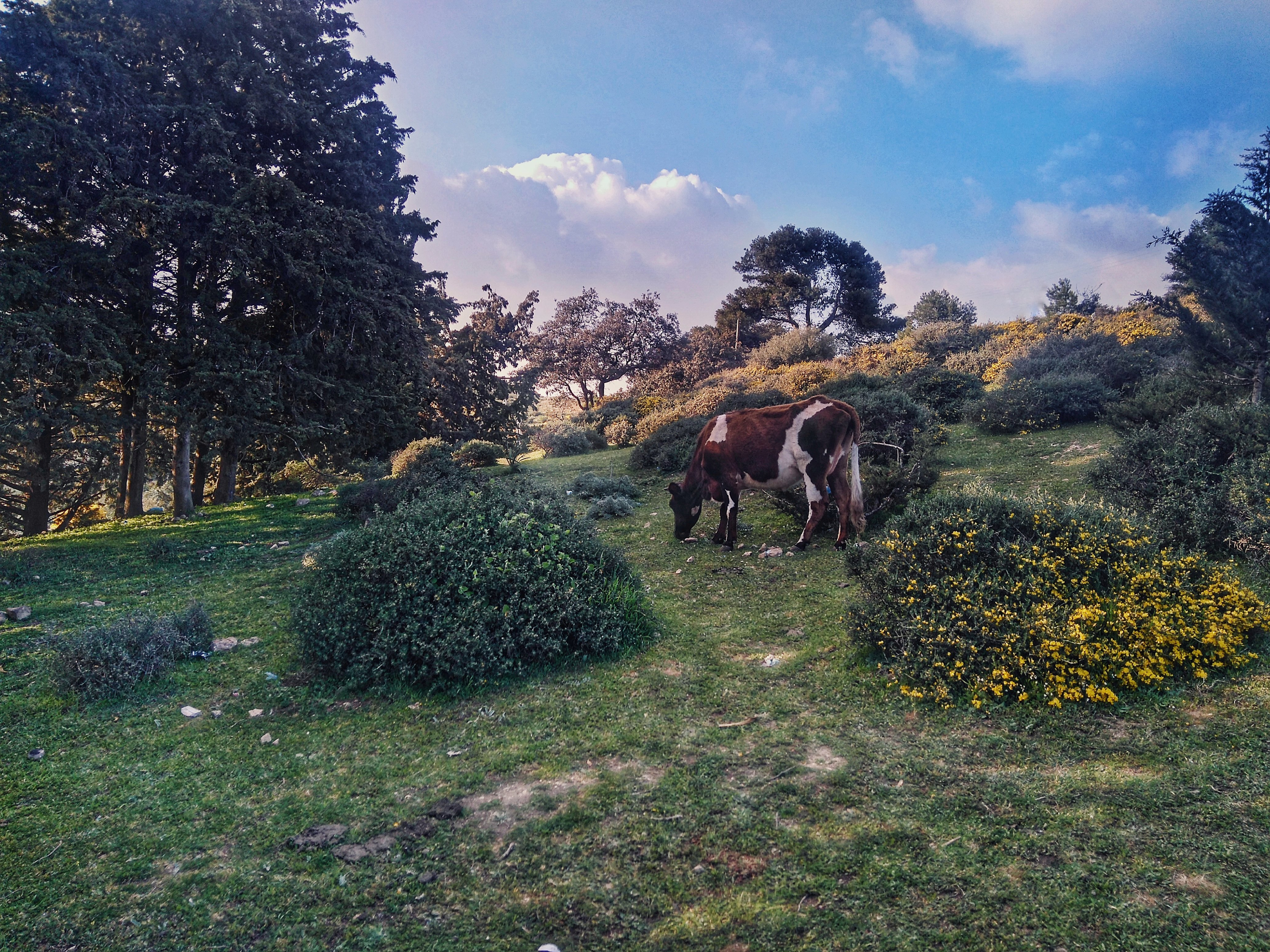

- Location within Algeria
- Coordinates: 35.242955°N 0.773163°W
- Country: Algeria
- Province: Sidi Bel Abbès Province
- Time zone: UTC+1 (CET)

Tessala is a town and commune in Sidi Bel Abbès Province in north-western Algeria.
