= Nasir ibn Alnas =

Ruler of the Hammadids (r. 1062–1088)

Sultan of the Hammadid Sultanate
- Reign: 1062–1088
- Predecessor: Buluggin ibn Muhammad
- Successor: Al-Mansur ibn an-Nasir
- Born: unknown date
- Died: 1088
- Issue: Al-Mansur ibn an-Nasir; Abdallah ibn an-Nasir (governor of Marsa al-Dajaj and Algiers); Yusuf ibn an-Nasir (governor of Achir)
- Dynasty: Hammadid dynasty
- Religion: Islam
- Military career
- Allegiance: Hammadid dynasty
- Conflicts: Battle of Sebiba

An-Nasir ibn Alnas, (Arabic: الناصر بن الناس) (Alnnasir bin Alnaas) (died 1088) was the fifth ruler of the Hammadids in Algeria, from 1062 until his death.

== Life ==
An-Nasir succeeded Buluggin ibn Muhammad (1055–1062) after his murder in 1062. After the decline of the Zirids in Ifriqiya as a result of the invasion of the Banu Hilal (since 1051), An-Nasir was able to extend the influence of the Hammadids in the Maghreb. Vassals were installed in Tunis and territory as far as Kairouan came under control. Influence was also built up in the northern Sahara by driving out the Ibadi from Sadrata (1077). With the establishment of Bejaia as a second capital, maritime trade gained importance for the economy. Italian architects and craftsmen were enlisted in the construction of Bejaia. The extensive control of the trade routes led to economic growth and a flourishing of the kingdom.

The Hammadid state reached its peak under Ibn Alnas during which it briefly became the most important state in Northwest Africa. He established Hammadid rule in Sfax, Tunis, Kairouan, Susa, Tripoli and advanced far into the Sahara. He also built Bejaia and made it his capital. Nasir wrote to Pope Gregory VII seeking to have a certain Servandus consecrated as bishop for his Christian subjects. In his response, Gregory agrees to do so and refers to the past release of certain Christian prisoners, while expressing hope for further releases.

At the beginning of his reign, An-Nasir gave his brothers high positions : Kebbab ibn Alnas was posted at Miliyana, Rumman ibn Alnas at Suq Hamza, Khazar ibn Alnas at Nqaous and Balbar ibn Alnas at Constantine.

However, the stability of the realm was precarious, since the Bedouin Banu Hilal began to infiltrate the Hammadid state after their conquest of Ifriqiya. At first, they were used as mercenaries against the Almoravids - even when the Almoravids conquered territory as far as Algiers in 1081, they could be turned back with Bedouin help. But the Banu Hilal could not be kept under Hammadid control, and ultimately caused the downfall of the kingdom.

An-Nasir was succeeded by his son Al-Mansur ibn an-Nasir.

Preceded by Buluggin ibn Muhammad	Hammadid ruler 1062–1088	Succeeded by Al-Mansur ibn an-Nasir
