= Qal'at Bani Hammad =

Historic site in Algeria

- قلعة بني حماد (Arabic)
- Beni Hammad Fort
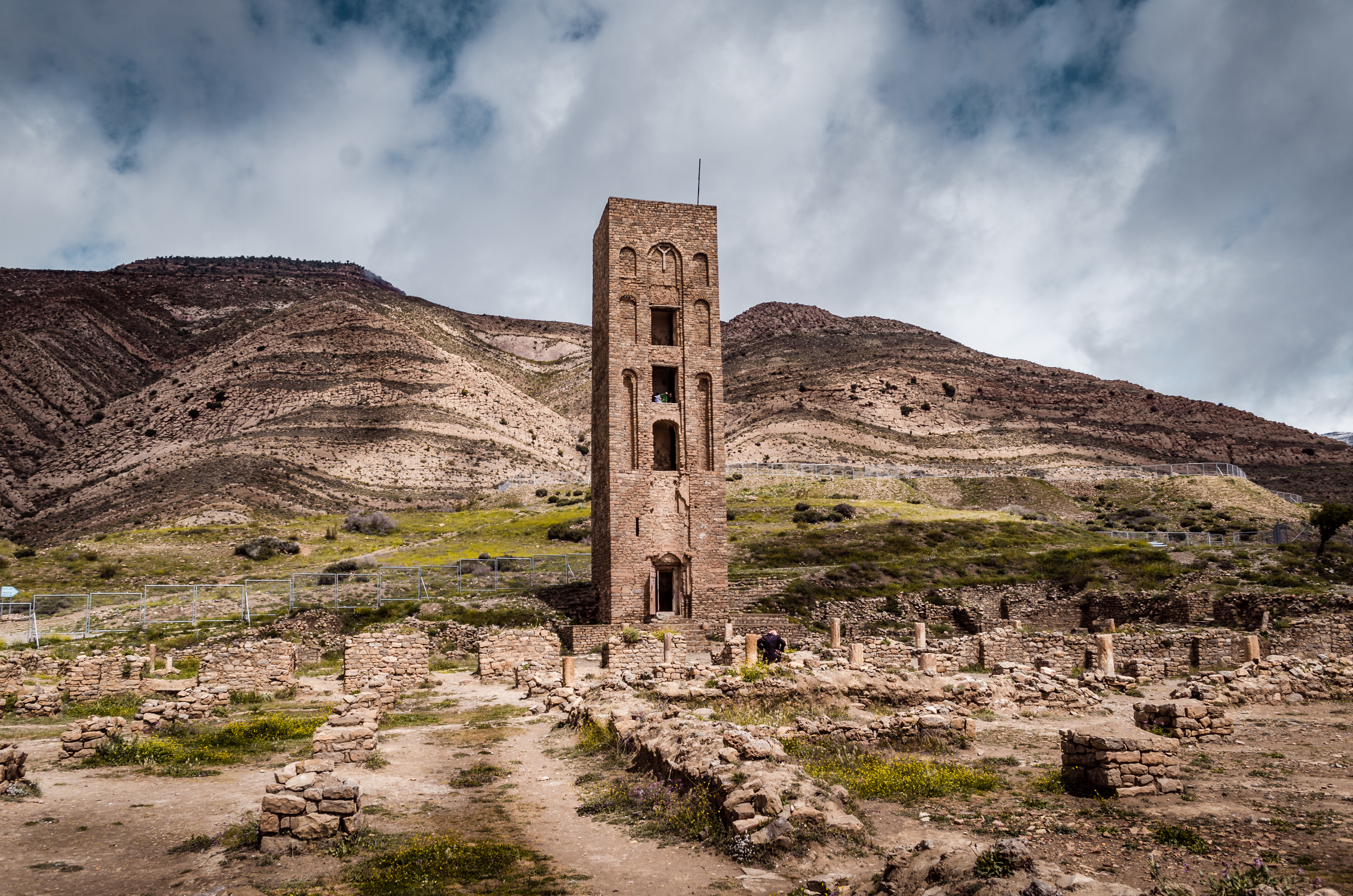

- Location in Algeria
- Interactive map of Qal'at Bani Hammad
- 35°48′50″N 04°47′36″E
- Type: Settlement
- Periods: Hammadid dynasty
- Location: Maadid, M'Sila Province, Algeria

History
- Built: 1007 CE
- Built by: Hammad ibn Buluggin
- Abandoned: 1090 CE

Site notes
- Architectural style: Western Islamic
- Condition: In ruins

UNESCO World Heritage Site
- Official name: Al Qal'a of Beni Hammad
- Type: Cultural
- Criteria: iii
- Designated: 1980 (4th session)
- Reference no.: 102
- Region: Arab States

Qal'at Bani Hammad (Arabic: قلعة بني حماد), also known as Qal'a Bani Hammad or Qal'at of the Beni Hammad (among other variants), is a fortified palatine city in Algeria. Now in ruins, in the 11th century, it served as the first capital of the Hammadid dynasty. It is in the Hodna Mountains northeast of M'Sila, at an elevation of 1,418 metres (4,652 ft), and receives abundant water from the surrounding mountains. The site is near the town of Maadid (aka Maadhid), about 225 kilometres (140 mi) southeast of Algiers, in the Maghreb.

In 1980, it was inscribed as a World Heritage Site by UNESCO under the name Al Qal'a of Beni Hammad, and described as "an authentic picture of a fortified Muslim city".

The town includes a 7-kilometre (4 mi) long line of walls. Inside the walls are four residential complexes, and the largest mosque built in Algeria after that of Mansurah. It is similar in design to the Grand Mosque of Kairouan, with a tall minaret, 20 metres (66 ft).

Excavations have brought to light numerous terracotta, jewels, coins and ceramics testifying to the high level of civilization under the Hammadid dynasty. Also among the artifacts discovered are several decorative fountains using the lion as a motif. The remains of the emir's palace, known as Dar al-Bahr, include three separate residences separated by gardens and pavilions.

== History ==
The fortress was built in 1007 by Hammad ibn Buluggin, the son of Buluggin ibn Ziri, and the founder of Algiers. The city became the capital of the Hammadid Berbers, and sustained a siege from the Zirid in 1017. In 1090, it was abandoned under the menace of the Banu Hilal, and was partly destroyed by the Almohads in 1152.

The Qalaa was described by Al-Bakri in the 11th century as a large and powerful military stronghold and a centre of commerce that attracted caravans from all over the Maghreb, Iraq, Syria, Egypt and the Hejaz. Ibn Khaldun also noted that the abundance of travellers was due to the wealth of resources offered to those interested in sciences, commerce and arts. The Qala attracted poets, sages and theologians. The architecture of the Hammadids even influenced that of the Normans.

Excavations began in 1908, resumed from 1952-1956 and continue to this day as most of the site remains unexplored and the aspects of the palaces await further study.

== Architecture ==
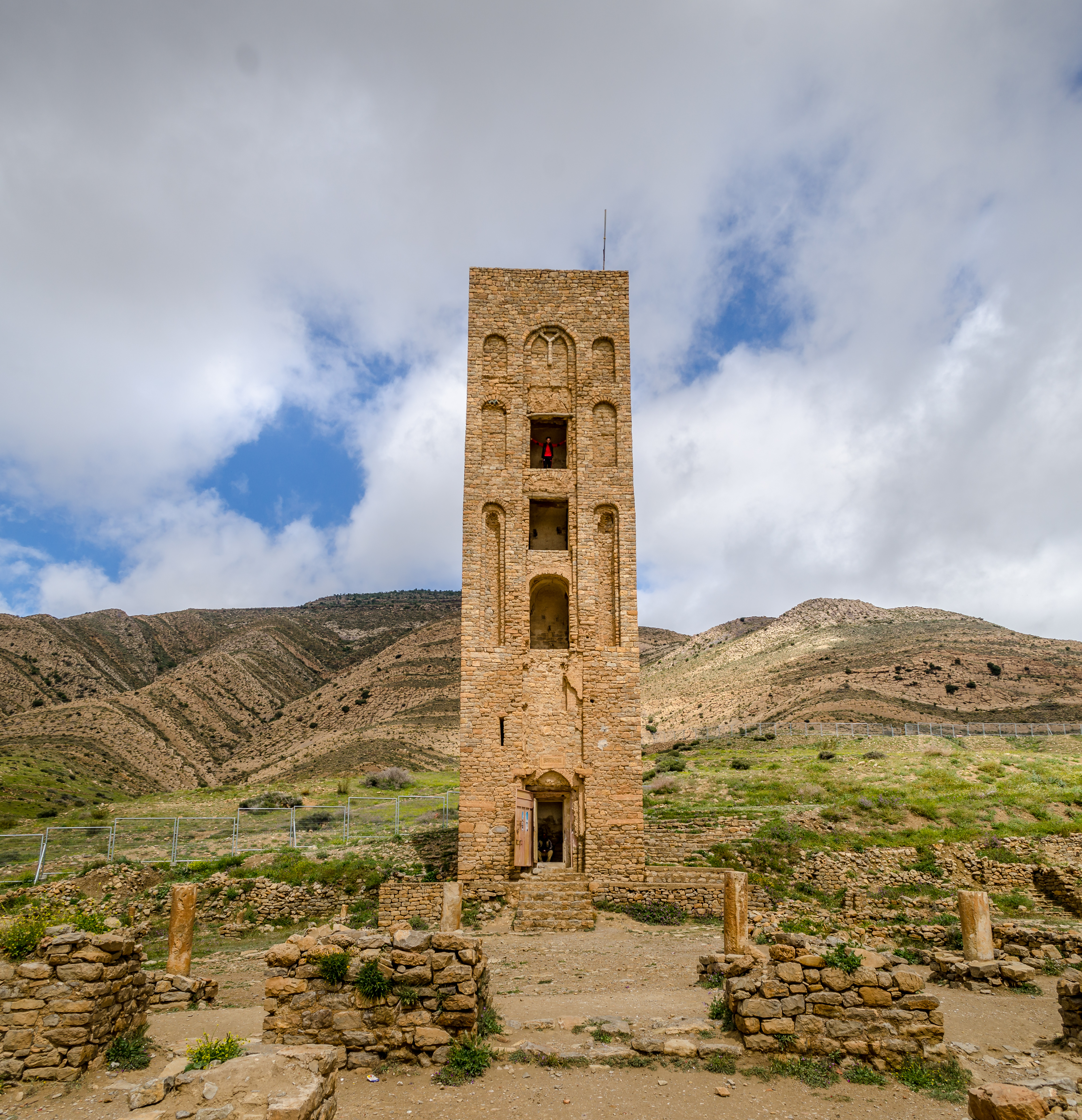
Remains of the main mosque's minaret today

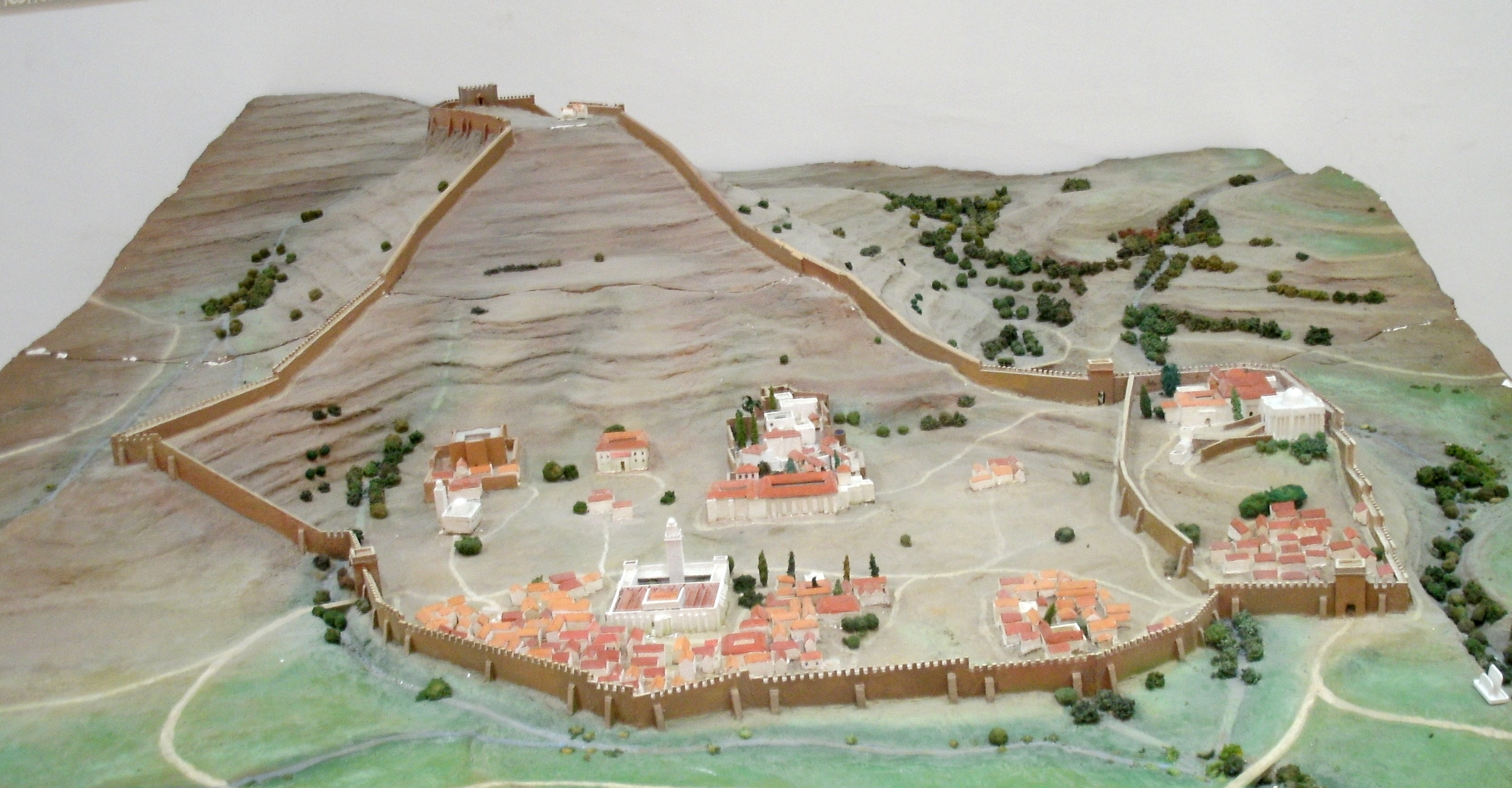
Scale model of the complex

=== Palaces ===
Hammadid emirs constructed five palaces, most of which are now destroyed. The keep of the Palace of the Fanal (Qasr al-Manar) does survive. The upper palace consists of three buildings arranged around an irregularly shaped forecourt: a private apartment, a domed hall and an entrance wing.

Other palaces such as the Qasr al-Kawab and Qasr al-Salam were constructed by the Hammadids. The Qasr al-Salam likely served as the residence of the ruler's family, and this structure summarises many aspects of typical Hammadid architecture. The Qasr al-Manar is another palace, its layout has resemblance to the Upper palace and Qasr al-Salam as its main elements are composed of a forecourt with an audience hall and a private apartment both surrounded with T-shaped pillared porticos.

==== Dar al-Bahr, the Lake Palace ====
The Dar al-Bahar (or Qsar al-Bahr) which is located nearby the congregational mosque was most likely used for public audiences and/or the palace of the Emir. The eastern court occupied by a large water basin inspired the name of the palace. Located between two courtyards is the main reception room, and a domed hall is located north of the water court. The outer walls consist of buttresses varying in design. As for the water courtyard, the court is 71 metres (233 ft) long and 51 metres (167 ft) wide while the basin is 68 metres (223 ft) long, 48 metres (157 ft) wide and 1.3 metres (4 ft 3 in) deep. The courtyard was surrounded on all sides by T-shaped pillared porticos.

The Dar al-Bahr palace was named for its rectangular pool, which measured 67 by 47 metres (220 by 154 ft). A ramp at one end of the pool was used to launch boats. References to nautical displays in this pool appear in the accounts of contemporary visitors. The pool was surrounded by a portico, and accessed through a monumental entrance on the east side. West of the pool was an elevated terrace and courtyard with gardens. Outside the walls of the palace complex, gardens extended east-to-west across the city, and to a depth of nearly 100 metres (330 ft). The gardens have not yet been explored by archeologists, although ornamental fountains have been discovered.

=== Mosque ===
The Hammadid mosque is said to have been the largest mosque constructed in North Africa prior to the twentieth century and it features the typical Maghreb style square minaret. In Qal'at Beni Hammad, the minaret, 82 feet (25 m) in height, is the only remaining part of the ruined Great Mosque; the structure bears some resemblance to Seville's Giralda.

=== Decoration ===
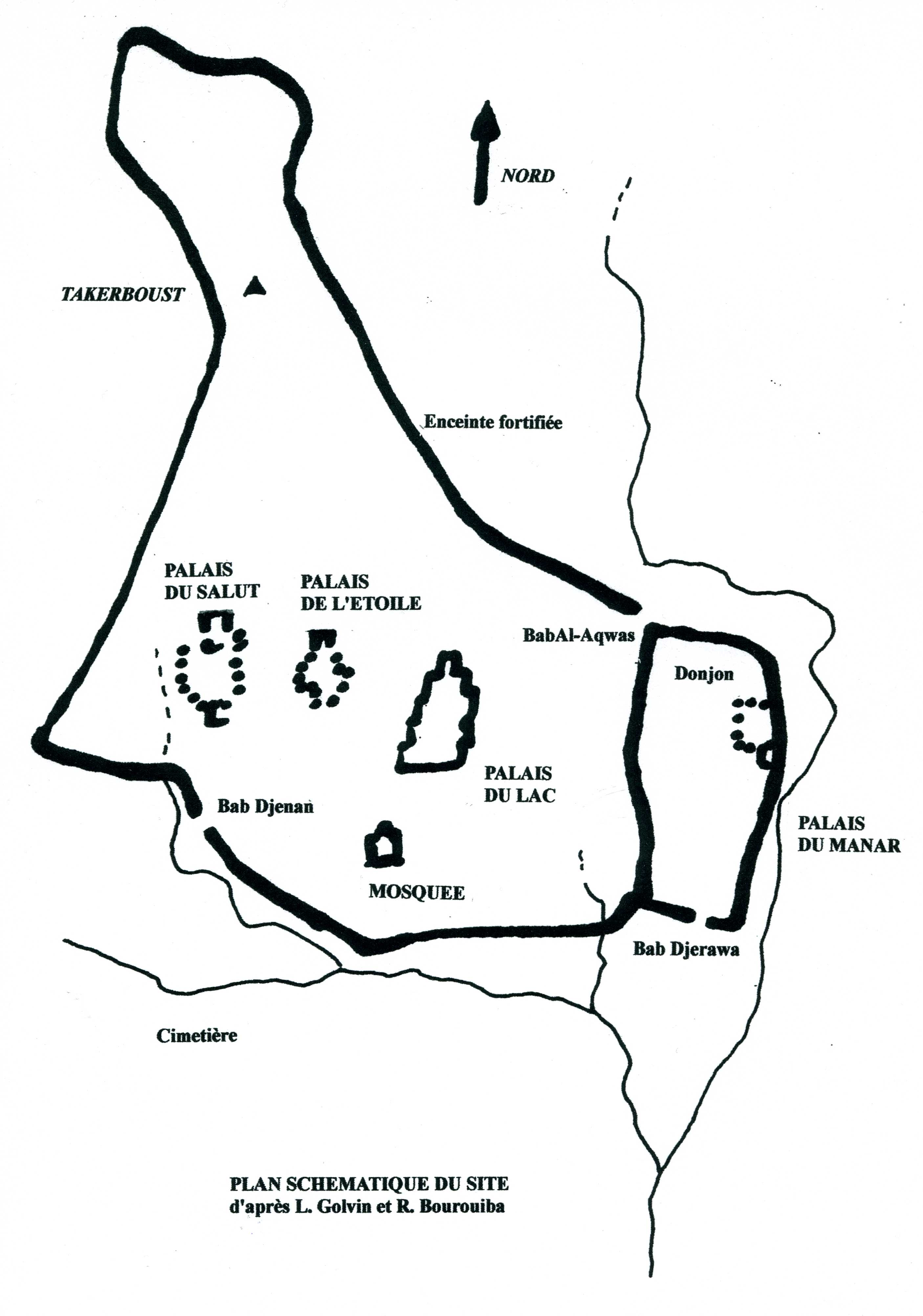
Plan of Qal'at Bani Hammad (place names in French)

Architecture in Qalaat Beni Hammad featured adornments of "porcelain mosaics of many-colored faience, sculpted panels and plaster, enameled terra-cotta stalactites; building and pottery ornamentation consisted of geometric designs and stylized floral motifs."

In the Qal’at Beni Hammad fragments of stucco were discovered from the Qasr al-Salam and the Qasr al-Manar which may be the oldest fragments of muqarnas in the Western Islamic world, dating back to the 11th or 12th century. There are no earlier examples of muqarnas in the Islamic West. According to Lucien Golvin the fragments of the muqarnas semi-dome at the Qasr al-Salam are the oldest documented remains of a true muqarnas vault in the Islamic world. However, other scholars of Islamic architecture have questioned or rejected the dating of these fragments or their identification as true muqarnas.

Furthermore, the Qal’at buildings are considered to be documented antecedents and precursors to certain developments in Western Islamic art in the 12th century. Plaster capitals that were found at the Qal’at were composed of smooth leaves recurved in their upper part are considered to be an antecedent to the common Almoravid and Almohad forms which are seen in the Great Mosque of Tlemcen or in Tinmel. The framework of a marble basin and a grey marble fragment document the use of multifoil arches with spiral-form impost decoration. The use of this motif at the Qal’at subsequently spread during the times of the Almoravids and became universal in Almohad buildings. The square rooms surrounded by rampant barrel vaults in the Qasr al-Manar have been compared to the Almohad minarets and the Torre Pisana in Palermo which it predates. The Hammadid palaces are also noted to contain the first or one of the first documented use of shadirwan.

== Gallery ==
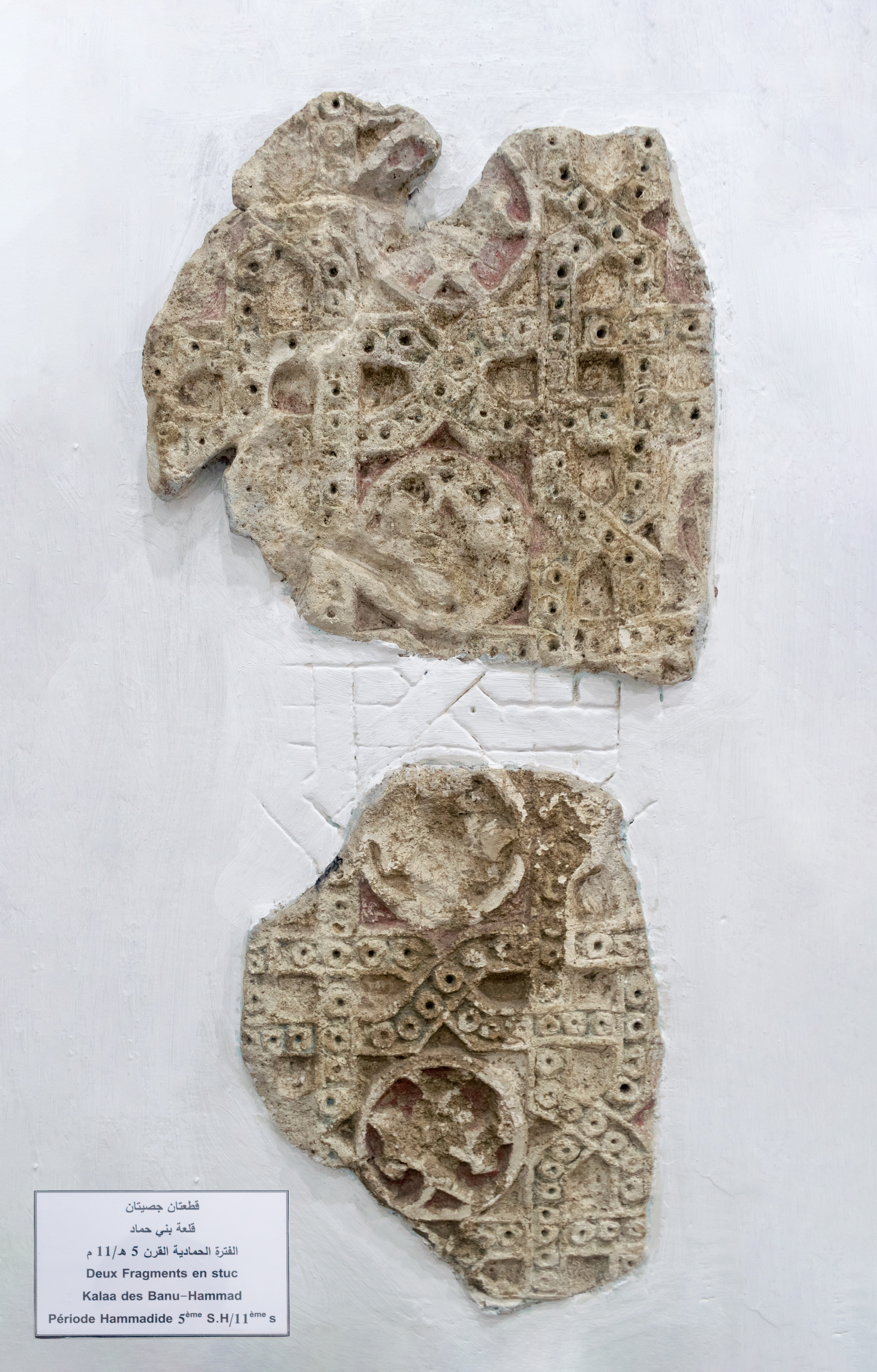
Two stucco fragments from Qalâa des Béni Hammad

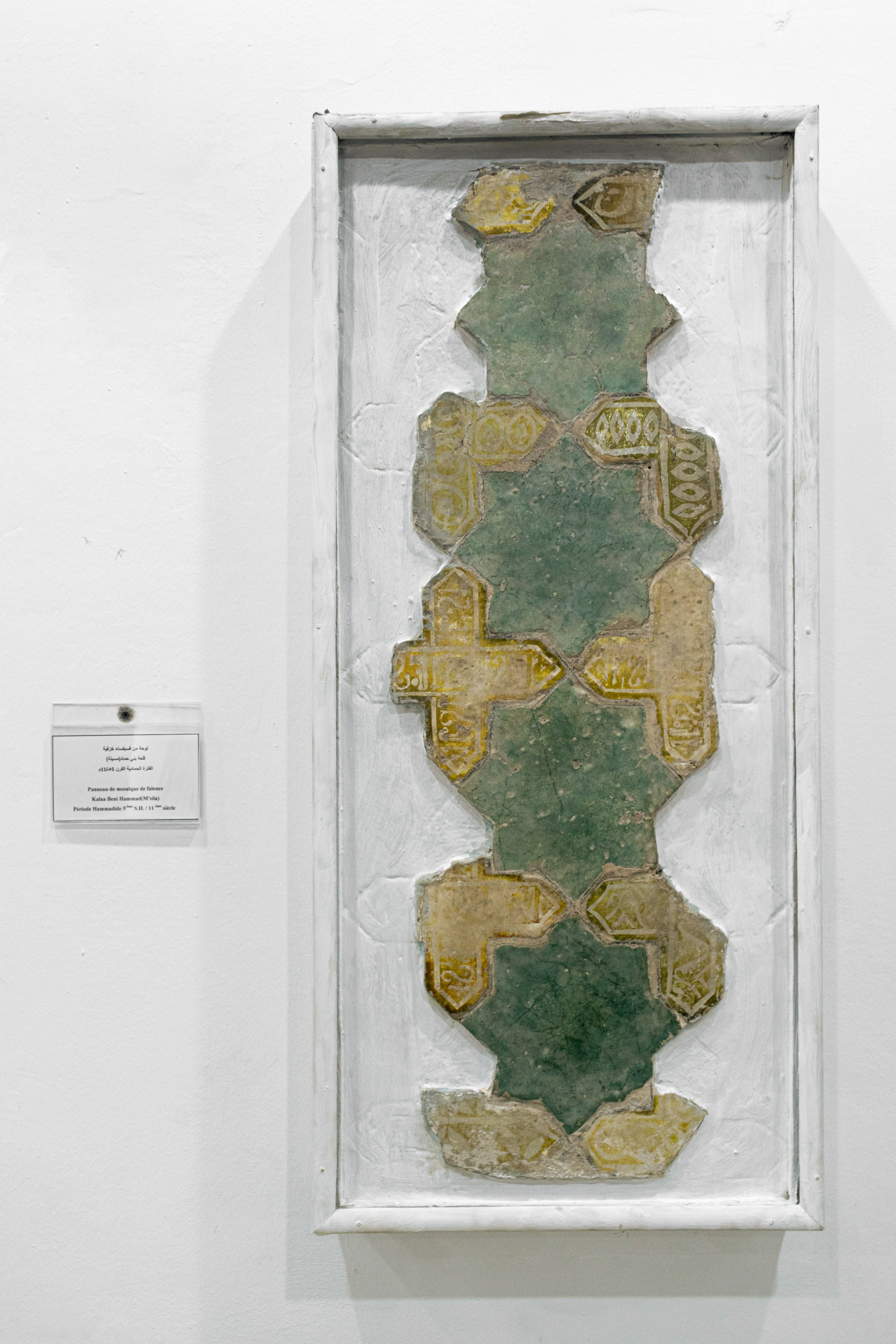
Mosaic panel in faience from Qalâa of the Beni Hammad

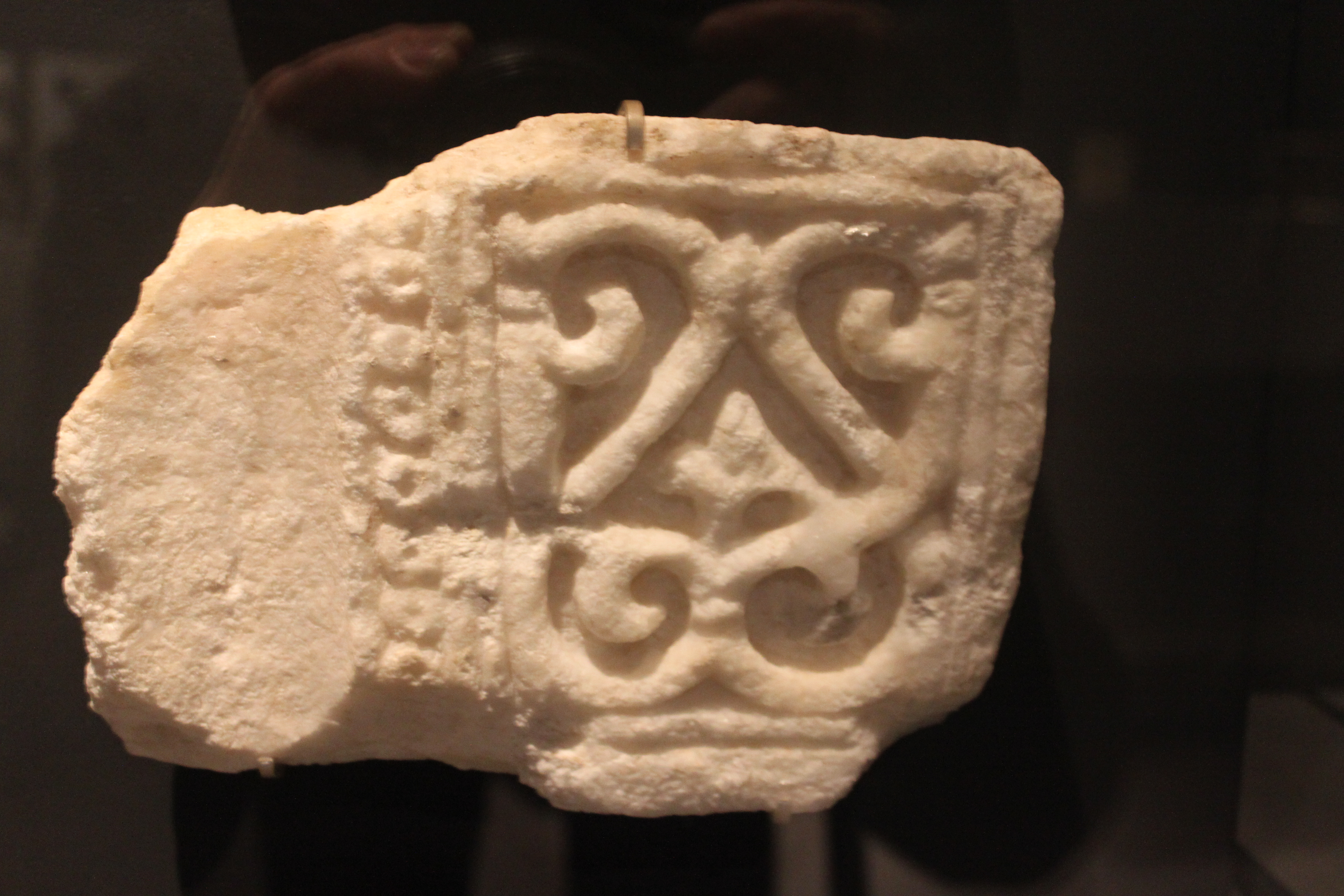
Piece from Qal'at Bani Hammad, currently held in the Louvre

== See also ==
- High medieval domes
