= Battle of Chelif River (1015) =

1015 battle in Algeria between the Zirid and Hammadid armies

Battle of Chelif (1015)
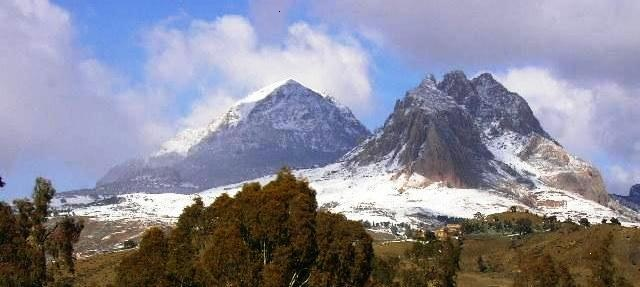
- Ouarsenis mountain range, where the battle occurred
Date	17 October 1015 (Sunday)
Location	Ouarsenis, Algeria 35°22′N 1°19′E
Result	Zirid victory

Belligerents
Hammadid Emirate	Zirid Emirate; Zenata tribes; Miknasa; Hammadid rebels

Commanders and leaders
Hammad ibn Buluggin; Bakar al-Watlakati #; Yusuf ibn Abi Habus	Badis ibn Mansur; Atiya Dafelten; Yaddar bin Luqman; Ismail ibn al-Buni #

Strength
~30,000 cavalry	~30,000 cavalry

Casualties and losses
Unknown	Unknown
- Location within Algeria

The Battle of Chelif River was fought on 17 October 1015 between the Zirid army of Badis ibn Mansur, the Emir of ifriqiya, and the Hammadid army under the Hammadid Emir Hammad ibn Buluggin and his brother Ibrahim. This battle was part of the Zirid-Hammadid war which resulted in the splitting of the previous Zirid domains into two independent emirates. It took place near the medieval city of Tahert located in the south of Chelif River, and was a decisive Zirid victory.

Badis's army, composed of allies from the berber tribes inhabiting the region, crossed the Chelif River and established their base near its banks. On October 17, 1015, the Zirid army advanced towards the Hammadid camp. The largely unexpected attack led by the Zirid emir resulted in a bloody battle during which the Zenata forces switched sides to Badis. Ultimately, the Zirid army overwhelmed the Hammadid forces, although Emir Hammad himself survived the defeat. Following their victory, the Zirids looted the camp, gathered supplies, and took hostages.

== Background ==
After the defeat of the Zirid army at Béja, Badis moved towards the Central Maghreb and reached Tamdit. Hammad arrived there with 30,000 horsemen, not counting the infantry and soldiers who had joined Badis. In Tamdit, Badis received news of the death of his son, Mansur Aziz al-Dawla, who had contracted smallpox and died after seventeen days. Despite this, Badis remained steadfast and held a public mourning session on 25 July 1015 AD. The next day, Badis departed from Tamdit towards Dekma, where a number of Hammad's supporters, including state officials, joined him. Khalaf al-Himyari, the governor of Ashir, also pledged allegiance to Badis, This weakened Hammad, who had hoped to fortify himself in that stronghold, and he retreated to Tiaret.

According to Ibn Khaldun, many of Hammad's supporters, including the Zenatian tribe of Banu Abi Walil, along with the Banu Hassan a sanhadja tribe, as well as other Zenatian tribes, defected to Badis. The chief of Banu Ghamrat received valuable gifts and was granted the governorship of Tobna. Hammad was forced to flee to Chlef. Badis arrived in M'sila on 20 August 1015 AD, where he was welcomed by the inhabitants. He moved towards Qal'at Bani Hammad but returned to M'sila without engaging in battle, sending an army led by his brother Karama to destroy the fortress built by Hammad without looting or bloodshed.

Ibn Khaldun also notes that Badis seized Ashir, causing Ibrahim to flee, and then pursued Hammad. At Wadi al-Tin, the large Zenata tribe of Banu Tujin surrendered to Badis. Their leader, Atiya Dafalaten, sought to avenge his father, killed by Hammad, and was followed by his cousin, Yaddar bin Luqman bin al-Mu'tar. Badis rewarded these leaders and accepted their assistance. Historian Al-Raqiq provided information about the Banu Tujin's alliance with Badis, noting that upon reaching the banks of the Chelif river, Badis enticed the Banu Tujin, who had previously supported Hammad with 3000 men under Atiya bin Dafalaten and his influential cousin Luqman bin al-Mu'tar.

== Battle ==
Atiya sent his son Yaddar to inform Badis of their defection. It can be inferred that the Banu Tujin, led by Luqman bin al-Mu'tar, only abandoned Hammad during the battle, according to a pre-arranged plan with Badis and their leaders. Badis crossed the Chelif River, passing in front of Mount Ouarsenis and Sersou without crossing the Wadi Wassel. He set up camp on the riverbanks at the base of Mount Ghazoul. On the opposite side of the deep and full river, Hammad stood leaning against the rugged Mount Bani Watil. Both armies were looking at each other, and the two opponents prepared for battle.

Badis remained vigilant and cautious. On the morning of Sunday, 17 October 1015, he mobilized his troops and positioned each commander in their place. It seems Hammad did not anticipate the enemy crossing the river that day. He might not have adequately guarded all possible crossings. Regardless, Badis advanced on horseback, followed by his cavalry, while the infantry swam across. This happened swiftly without any resistance from the enemy. When the two forces met, a fierce battle ensued. Badis's men were determined to either endure or die, knowing Hammad's cruelty to captives. The fighting was intense, and many of Hammad's supporters, especially the Banu Tujin, deserted him and joined Badis. Hammad, abandoned by his men, fled along with 500 of his cavalrymen to the fortress of Maghila, after killing his wives with his own hands to prevent them from falling into enemy hands.

Badis's army seized Hammad's possessions, including ten thousand adarga shields. The medieval chronicler Ibn al-Athir noted that had they not been preoccupied with looting, Hammad would have been captured. Badis rewarded the Banu Tujin for their significant contribution to the victory by allowing them to keep all the spoils of the day. He confirmed Luqman bin al-Mu'tar as the leader of his tribe and all its territories, allowing him to retain any lands he could capture in future battles for the Zirid. Leadership of the Banu Tujin eventually passed to the descendants of Dafalaten. While Ibn Khaldun may have exaggerated the spoils granted to the Banu Tujin, he acknowledged their crucial role in Badis's victory.

== Aftermath ==
After the Battle, Hammad headed towards the fortress of Magila, located 25 km north of Tiaret. He arrived there on 2 Jumada al-Awwal 406 AH (18 October 1015 AD) and then proceeded to the Qal'at Bani Hammad five days later. Upon reaching his fortress, Hammad and his brother Ibrahim fortified themselves there, staying for three days to rest and allow their horses and companions to recuperate. Ibrahim informed Hammad of their need for more food and salt. Hammad, along with everyone who was with him and his brother, then marched to the town of Dekma. Holding grievances against its inhabitants and with Badis in pursuit, the townspeople raised an alarm. Hammad confronted them with his sword, killing around 300 men. Subsequently, Hammad took all the food and salt from Dekma and returned to his fortress.

As for Badis, on the day of Hammad's defeat, he brought out Bakkar bin Jalalah al-Watilakati, who had been taken prisoner. Bakkar was known for his loose tongue. Yusuf bin Abi Habus was also detained by Badis. Bakkar was brought out in Yusuf's presence, and his beard was shaved while Yusuf watched. Then Yusuf's beard was also shaved, making them a notorious example in this world. The author of Al-Bayan continued his account of the Battle of Chelif by mentioning what happened to Bakkar bin Jalalah al-Watilakati, who had been captured by Badis. Bakkar had insulted the Zirid emir. Badis then ordered his beard to be shaved, his nose and ear to be cut off, and his hands to be amputated. This drove Bakkar to suicide. He struck his head forcefully against a pillar, collapsing to the ground dead.

Meanwhile, Badis continued his journey towards the east. He reached M'sila on 28 Jumada al-Awwal 406 AH / 13 November 1015 CE. There, he received an envoy from his uncle Ibrahim, tasked with presenting apologies on behalf of Hammad who acknowledged his mistake. The envoy also reminded Badis of the services Hammad had rendered to the Zirid dynasty by saying : "Had he not vigilantly defended the western borders and supported the renowned leader al-Hajjaj bin Yusuf bin Umayyah?". Badis also received other messages, including apologies from Ibrahim and Hammad. The historian Hady Roger mentioned that it is likely that Badis responded and imposed conditions he considered crucial, such as unconditional surrender. He then proceeded to lay siege to the Qal'at Bani Hammad, which lasted for over 6 months.
