= Battle of Yawm al-Nahr =

1052 battle in Tunisia

- Part of Hilalian invasion of Ifriqiya
Date	13 April 1052
Location	Unknown location in Gabès Governorate
Result	Hilalian Victory

Belligerents
Zirid Dynasty	Banu Hilal

Commanders and leaders
Ibn Salbun; Zaknun ibn Wa’lan; Ziri al-Sanhaji	Unknown

Casualties and losses
Heavy	Light

Battle of Yawm al-Nahr (1052), is the first military clash between the Zirids and Banu Hilal.

== Background ==
After the break between Kairouan and Cairo, the Fatimids sent the Banu Hilal to punish the rebellious Zirids. After events that occurred between Mu’nis ibn Yahya and al-Mu’izz ibn Badis that ended with the arrest of Mu’nis's Family, the Arabs began looting the country, and even after the peace agreements, they continued to do so, so al-Mu’izz ibn Badis was forced to respond.

== Battle ==
After he defeated the brother of Mu’nis, Al-Mu’izz camped outside Kairouan, and sent a vanguard of his large army to the south under the leadership of Ibn Salbun, Zaknun ibn Wa’lan, and Ziri al-Sanhaji. It was the day of Eid al-Adha, April 13, 1052, The Zirid army attacked the Arabs during the Eid prayer, but the Arabs mounted their horses, took up their weapons, and went to defend themselves, They were victorious, and many of the Sanhaja were killed.

== Aftermath ==
One day after this battle, Al-Mu’izz was defeated in the famous Battle of Haydaran, and the Arabs advanced and besieged Kairouan for a long time until they entered it in 1057.
