= Tobna =

Ancient Roman town located in the city of Bitam

- Ṭubna (Arabic)
- Tubunae, Thubunae
- Location within Algeria
- 35.34846°N 5.34584°E
- Type: Settlement
- Location: Batna Province, Algeria

Site notes
- Elevation: 457 m (1,499 ft)

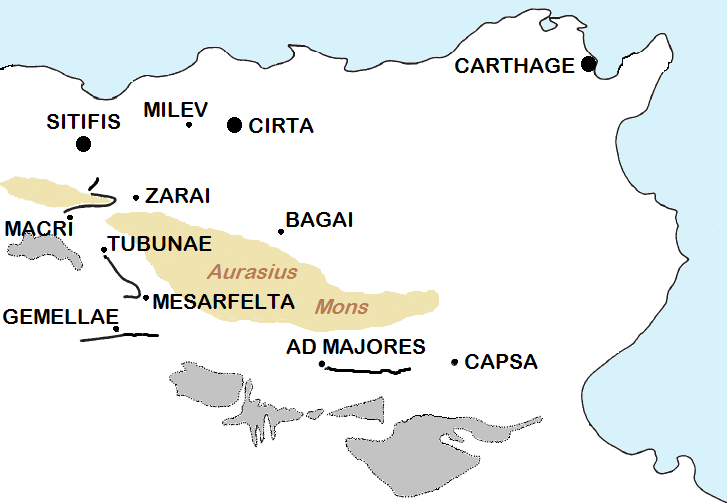
Map showing Tubunae in the Fossatum Africae, south of Sitifis

Tobna (Ṭubna), also known by the ancient names of Tubunae or Thubunae, is a ruined former city in Batna Province of Algeria, located just south of the modern city of Barika. From this position, it once controlled the eastern part of the Hodna region, while M'Sila did the west. It flourished from the time of the Roman Empire through the Islamic Middle Ages until it was sacked and destroyed by the Banu Hilal in the 11th century, after which it was finally abandoned.

Poorly documented by archaeologists today, Tobna's ruins occupy an extensive area and include the remains of a Byzantine fortress as well as the traces of a wall covering a 950 m by 930 m area.

== History ==
The site of Tobna is poorly studied by archaeologists as of 2019. The same is true of the surrounding Hodna region in general. Jean Baradez's aerial surveys in Algeria, published in 1949, provided the first aerial images of the site. From this data, he worked on reconstructing the Roman road network surrounding the city. Only a single milestone appearing to mention Tobna by name has been found; it was located on the ancient road to Nicivibus (Ngaous) and carries the inscription "[a Thu]bonis". Reconstruction of the surrounding road network has mostly been deduced from the distances recorded on other milestones in the area as well as their locations.

Roman Tubunae first became a municipium under Septimius Severus. In 427 CE, Count Boniface met with Augustine of Hippo during his stay in the city.

In Late Antiquity, Tobna was the seat of a military district called the limes Tubuniensis, which is listed in the Notitia Dignitatum as one of the sixteen praepositi limitis under the jurisdiction of the Comes of Africa and later a part of Byzantine North Africa. A fortress was built here during the reign of Justinian. This fortress has survived to the present day; it is moderately sized, located at a point somewhat higher than the surrounding plain. By the 680s, it had become a base for the Berber king Kasila, with the Byzantine officials acquiescing. Tobna had formerly been the seat of the Comes of Africa, but that office had fallen out of use by the mid-600s.

Byzantine Tobna lay at the border of the provinces of Numidia and Mauretania Caesariensis (aka Mauretania Sitifensis). Later on, the Muslim historian Abu Bakr al-Maliki considered Tobna to be on the western limit of Ifriqiya.

Tobna was an important city in the Islamic Middle Ages: the geographer al-Bakri called it the most important city of the Maghreb between Kairouan and Sijilmassa. Al-Bakri described the city as being surrounded by a brick wall, with monumental gateways. Tobna had five gates: to the west, the Bāb Khakān; to the east, the Bāb Fatḥ (with vents); to the south, the Bāb Tāhūdha (made of iron) and the Bāb al-Jadīd; and to the north, the Bāb Kurāma. On the south side of the city was the fortress, which featured vaulted chambers, a cistern dating to the Byzantine period, a Jami mosque, and the governor's palace (dār al-'imāra).

Inside the walls, the main street of Tobna ran east–west ("simaṭ", corresponding to the Roman Decumanus Maximus) and was lined with shops and markets. More markets lay outside the city walls in the extensive suburbs, of which the most important was to the west. There was also a hammam. Tobna had an eclectic population including Arabs, Persians serving in the army, Berbers, and Roman Africans who were mostly of Berber descent with some Roman ancestry. Ibn Hawqal and al-Bakri both remarked on the bitter rivalry between the Arabs and the Roman Africans in the city, with the Arabs seeking allies in the Arabs of Tahudha and Sétif and the Roman Africans seeking allies in the Biskra region.

Beyond the walls were extensive suburbs, a cemetery (to the east), and irrigated gardens and farms. The city was irrigated by the waters of the Oued Bitham; according to al-Bakri, "Every time it overflows, it waters all the gardens and fields in the suburbs and provides the inhabitants with abundant harvests." Major crops included wheat, barley, flax, and cotton. Orchards grew dates, among other fruits, and there was cattle and sheep breeding until the 10th century.

For two centuries beginning c. 700 CE, Tobna was a major strategic center for Muslim rulers, serving as capital of the Zab region. It had a garrison (jund) and newly built walls, and it served as the main point d'appui for campaigns against rebellious Berbers, including members of the Khawarij and, later, the Kutama tribe. One military governor of Tobna, Ibrahim I ibn al-Aghlab, went on to found the Aghlabid dynasty, which would rule Ifriqiya for a century.

In 906 CE, during the final years of Aghlabid power, Tobna was besieged by the forces of Abu Abdallah al-Shi'i, an Isma'ili missionary who had gathered a large following among the Kutama tribe. Tobna was fortified with structures dating back to the Byzantine Empire, as well as a large Aghlabid garrison which defended itself with mangonels during the siege. Abu Abdallah's Kutama army sent sappers to the wall, protected by a dabbāba (literally "crawler") or battering ram with a protective roof. The sappers succeeded in collapsing one of the towers along the city wall, and the Kutama were able to enter the city through the breach. The defenders soon surrendered; Ibn Idhari recorded this as taking place at the end of Dhu al-Hijjah, 293 AH (~ mid-October 906 CE).

Tobna then became part of the Fatimid Caliphate. The Zenata tribe to the west were enemies of the Fatimids, and in 927, in order to contain them, the Fatimids established a new regional capital further west, at Msila. Tobna thus lost much of its civic and military importance. Many of its inhabitants relocated west to Msila, and economic activity declined. The wars with the Zenata also hindered agricultural development.

Under the Zirid dynasty, Tobna had a Zenata governor named Fulful ibn Sa'id ibn Khazrun, who was appointed by al-Mansur ibn Buluggin in 992 and reconfirmed by his successor Badis ibn Mansur in 996. However, in 999, Fulful rebelled, and in retaliation, Badis pillaged the city. In 1017, a peace treaty between Badis's successor, al-Mu'izz, and Hammad ibn Buluggin, al-Mansur's brother and founder of the Hammadid dynasty, gave control of Tobna to the Hammadids, and Hammad's son al-Qa'id was made its governor. Under Hammadid rule, Tobna briefly enjoyed a renewed prosperity.

That ended during the mid-11th century, when the Banu Hilal invaded the region. Ibn Khaldun described the devastation they brought: after sacking and destroying both Tobna and Msila, the Banu Hilal attacked the caravanserais, towns, villages, and farms, razing them completely to the ground.

Tobna never recovered. While it was repopulated, it lost its importance in favor of Biskra, and soon after it was abandoned altogether.

=== List of known governors ===
- al-Aghlab (761)
- al-Muhallab ibn Yazid (date not given)
- al-Fadl ibn Rawh (until 791, when he was appointed governor of Ifriqiya)
- al-'Ala ibn Sa'id (791-794)
- Ibrahim ibn al-Aghlab (797-800, founder of Aghlabid dynasty)
- Salim ibn Jalbun (dismissed in 847)
- Yahya ibn Salim (appointed by Abu Abdallah al-Shi'i in 906)
- Fulful ibn Sa'id ibn Khazrun (992-999)

== Christian diocese ==
There were two towns called Tubunae in the territory of what is now Algeria, when it was part of the Roman Empire. One is referred to as Tubunae in Mauretania, because it was part of the Roman province of Mauretania Caesariensis. The other (the modern town of Tobna) is called Tubunae in Numidia, because it was situated in the Roman province of Numidia. Writers such as Morcelli uses the spelling "Tubunae" for both of them, but the Catholic Church's list of titular sees refers to the second of them (corresponding to modern Tobna) as Thubunae in Numidia.

There it is even the possibility that both names are for the same settlement.

=== Tubunae in Mauretania ===
The names of none of the bishops of this town, which is mentioned by Ptolemy, have been preserved. The see was vacant when Huneric summoned the North African bishops to Carthage in 484.

=== Tubunae/Thubunae in Numidia ===
It was to this town "in the depths of Numidia" that Augustine of Hippo and Alypius went, probably in 421, to meet the Roman official Boniface and exhort him "to serve the Church by protecting the empire from the barbarians".

In 479 Huneric exiled a large number of Catholics there. Its ruins, known as Tobna, are in the Department of Constantine, Algeria, at the gates of the Sahara, west of the Chott el Hodna, the "Salinae Tubunenses" of the Romans. They are very extensive, for three successive towns occupied different sites, under the Romans, the Byzantines, and the Arabs. Besides the remains of the fortress, the most remarkable monument is a church now used as a mosque.

==== Bishops ====
Three bishops of Tubunae/Thubunae in Numidia are known. Saint Nemesianus assisted at the Council of Carthage (256). Saint Cyprian often speaks of him in his letters, and one letter survives which he wrote to Cyprian in his own name and in the name of those who were condemned with him to the mines. An inscription testifies to his cult at Tixter in 360, and the Roman Martyrology mentions him on 10 September. Another bishop was Cresconius, who usurped the see after quitting that of Bulla Regia, and who assisted at the Council of Carthage (411), where his rival was the Donatist Protasius. A third, Reparatus, was exiled by Huneric in 484.

== See also ==
- Mauretania Caesariensis
- Gemellae
- Sitifis

== Bibliography ==
- Laffi, Umberto. Colonie e municipi nello Stato romano Ed. di Storia e Letteratura. Roma, 2007 ISBN 8884983509
- Mommsen, Theodore. The Provinces of the Roman Empire Section: Roman Africa. (Leipzig 1865; London 1866; London: Macmillan 1909; reprint New York 1996) Barnes & Noble. New York, 1996
- Smyth Vereker, Charles. Scenes in the Sunny South: Including the Atlas Mountains and the Oases of the Sahara in Algeria. Volume 2. Publisher Longmans, Green, and Company. University of Wisconsin. Madison,1871 (Roman Tubunae)
