= Bab Dzira =

- باب الدزيرة
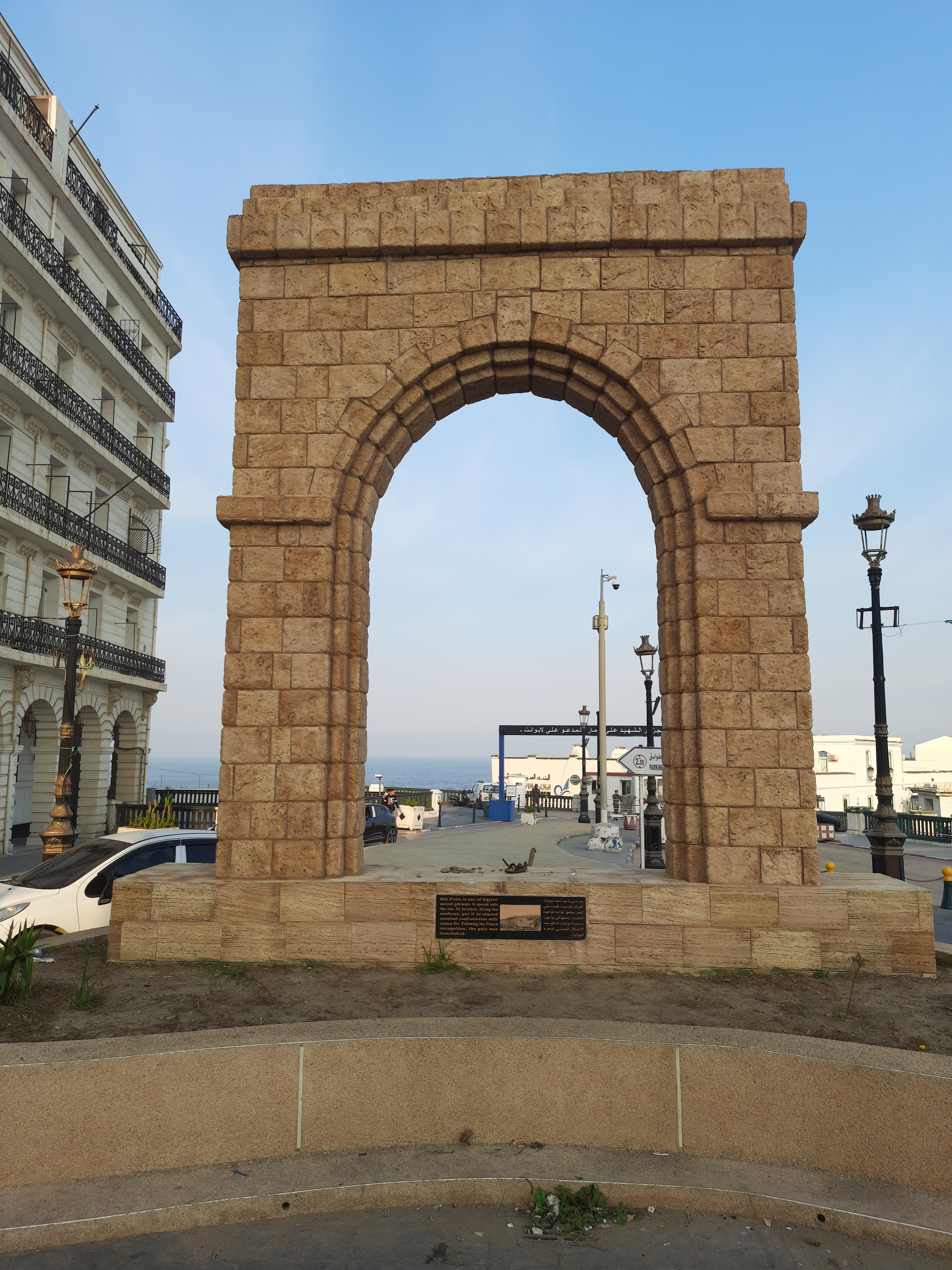

- Location within Algeria

General information
- Type: Former city gate; public urban space
- Architectural style: Ottoman (former); contemporary urbanism (current)
- Location: Boulevard Che Guevara, Algiers-Centre, Algiers Province, Algeria
- Coordinates: 36.7867°N 3.0658°E
- Opened: 24 June 2025 (public space inauguration)

Technical details
- Material: Stone (original gate)

Bab Dzira (in Arabic: باب الدزيرة), also known as Bab El Dzira, was one of the Seven Gates of the Casbah of Algiers, opening onto the sea along the city’s waterfront. It was among the historic city gates of Algiers. In recent years, the name Bab Dzira has also been used to designate a new urban space built between Boulevard Che-Guevara and Boulevard Zighoud Youcef, facing the Port of Algiers, designed for public leisure and recreation.

== History ==
Before the French conquest of Algiers in 1830, the Casbah of Algiers was surrounded by fortified walls pierced by several gates. Bab Dzira was one of these gates, opening directly toward the sea and linking the port to the inner city.

The origin of the name “Dzira” remains debated: some scholars associate it with the small islands once located off the coast of Algiers (from “island”), while others connect it to Bologhine ibn Ziri, founder of the Zirid dynasty.

After the French invasion of Algiers, many of these gates, including Bab Dzira, were demolished or heavily modified under colonial urban planning. The gate ceased to exist as a fortified structure and survived mainly as a toponym.

== Modern development ==
A new seaside promenade named Bab Dzira was developed between Boulevard Che-Guevara and Boulevard Zighoud-Youcef, facing the People’s National Assembly and the Algiers waterfront. It was officially inaugurated on 24 June 2025 as a leisure area featuring cafés, restaurants, and viewpoints over the harbor.

== Location ==
Bab Dzira is located in the lower Casbah area, near the Port of Algiers. Its approximate coordinates are 36°47′12″N, 3°03′57″E

== Gallery ==
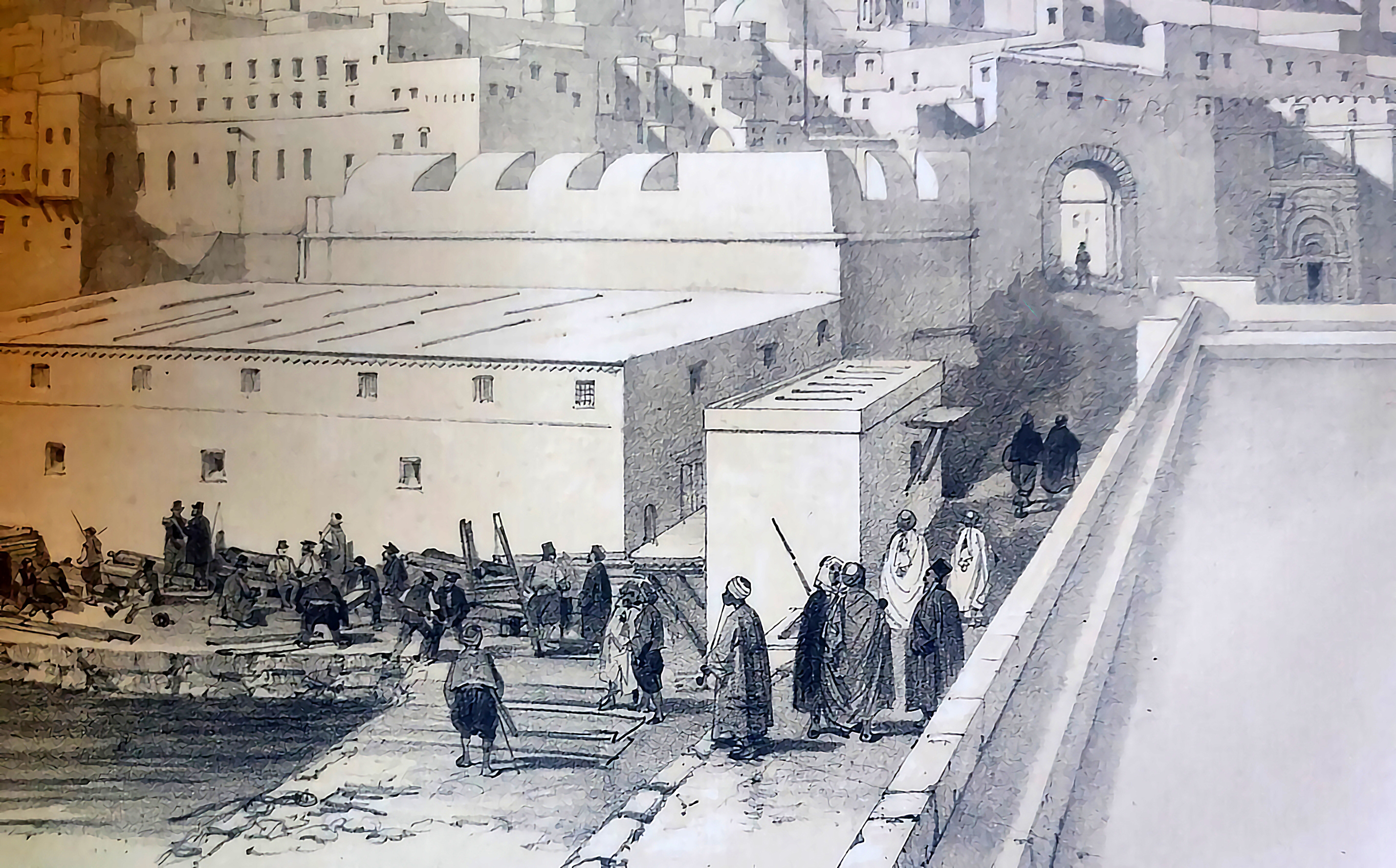
Engraving of Bab Dzira and Algiers port.

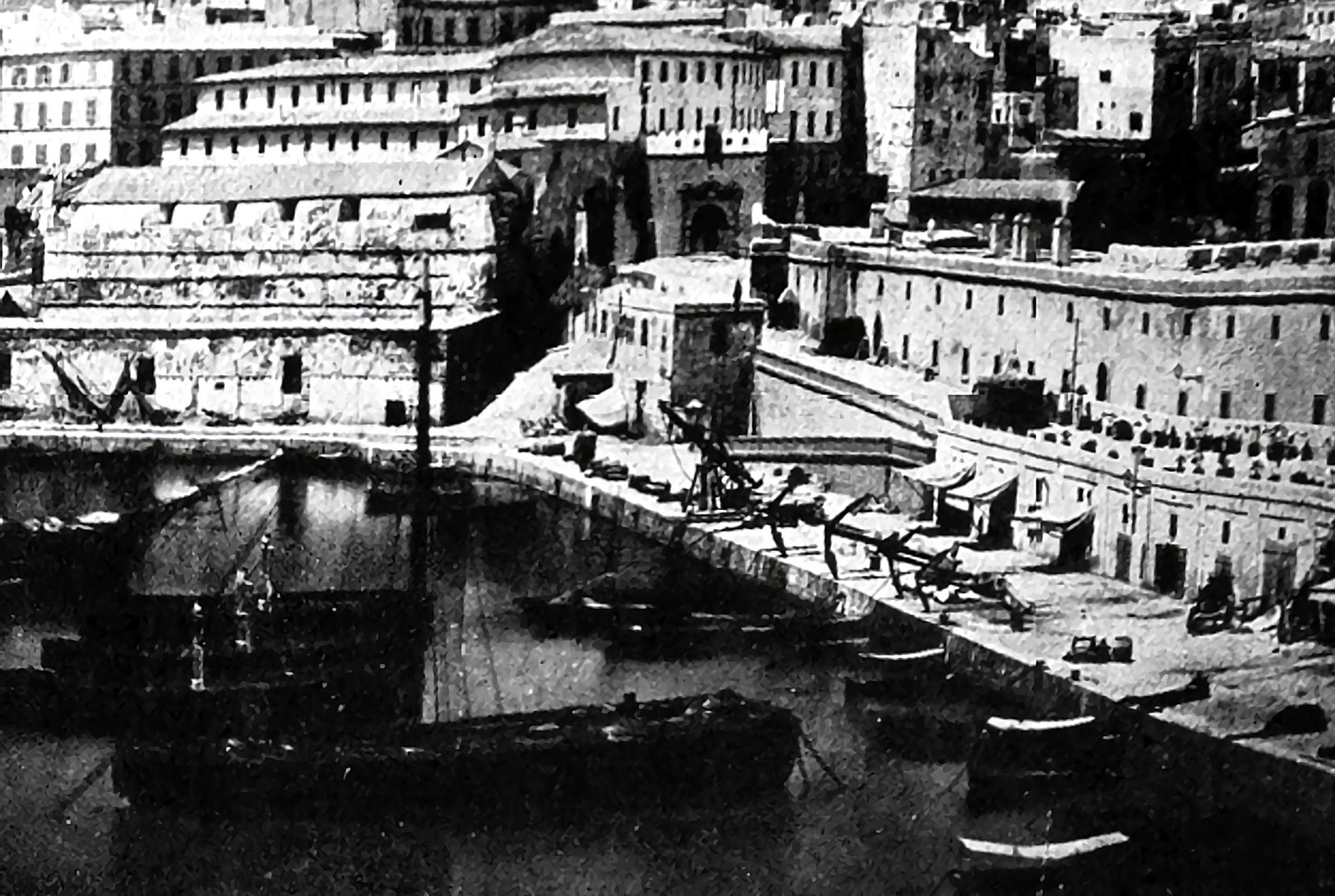
Old photograph of the port.

== See also ==
- Casbah of Algiers
- Gates of the Casbah of Algiers
