= Saïda bint Mansur =

Regent of the Zirid Dynasty
- Tenure: 1016 – 1023-24
- Monarch: Al-Mu'izz ibn Badis
- Died: 18 October 1023; Mahdia
- Burial: Essaîda cemetery
- Issue: Mallal
- House: Zirid
- Father: Al-Mansur ibn Buluggin

Saïda bint Mansur (Arabic: سعيدة بنت منصور) (d. 18 October 1023), known as Umm Mallal and al-Sayyida (princess), was a Zirid princess and a regent of the Zirid dynasty for her nephew Al-Mu'izz ibn Badis between 1016 and 1023.

== Biography ==
Saïda bint Mansur was the daughter of Al-Mansur ibn Buluggin and Badis ibn Mansur's sister. She was born at the Mansourieh Palace in Kairouan, Tunisia. She studied science and acquired vast knowledge; she was particularly recognized for her intelligence. The princess was known for her high moral qualities, her balance, and her wisdom.

Her brother Badis ibn al-Mansur came to power after his father's death in 995. Knowing her sister's great qualities and her wise advice, she shared decisions with her brother ("tukâssimû ma'ahû siyâsèt el mulk") writes about her Hassan Husni Abd al-Wahhab. She thus developed the general policies of the country with him. Her brother was constantly busy facing multiple rebellions, so he charged her with governing the state and providing for the needs of the population in his absence.

She was in the city of Mahdia when her brother Badis died in his camp during the siege of Kalâat Maghila (May 1016). The dignitaries of the state unanimously decided to appoint Princess Saïda as regent during the minority of her nephew, the Emir Al-Mu'izz ibn Badis.

She was a tutor of the young prince al-Mu'izz, who was probably under 9 years, and filled with zeal and competence the functions of regent. She was, in a way, the adoptive mother of al-Mu'izz and raised him. She spent winter with him in al-Mansuriyah and summer in Mahdia. It is she who seems to have chosen his tutor, the famous Abu l-Hasan 'Ali ibn Abi l-Rijal (d. 1034–35), who inculcated him with malikism. She made hubous in favor of the Great Mosque of Kairouan, a wonderful Koran that still exists in part and the deed of incorporation issued before by the Cadi 'Abd al-Rahman ibn Muhammad ibn 'Abd Allah ibn Hashim.

After her regency, Saida helped her nephew, the Emir, to solve several problems, such as the war between Sunnah and Shia, and thanks to her wisdom, she prevented the country from several wars. She greatly contributed to establishing Sunni Islam at the expense of Shia.

She is the mother of a son, Mallal, from whom she gets the nickname Oum Malel Al-Sanhejya.

== Death ==
When she fell ill in 1023, Sharaf al-Dawla Al-Mu'izz ibn Badis visited her daily. He stood at her bedside and allowed his own courtiers and slaves to be near the princess. She died on Thursday, 17 October 1023, Al-Mu'izz led the Salat al-Janazah (funeral prayer) and celebrated the funeral with banners, drums, and palanquins, deploying a pomp such as had never been seen before. The two Zirid princesses, the mother of al-Mu'izz and his sister Umm al-'Ulu, attended. She is buried in the cemetery of the Zirid emirs in Monastir, known as the "Essaîda" cemetery in her honor.

== Sources ==
Idris, Hady Roger (1962). La Berbérie Orientale sous les Zirides. Librairie d'Amérique et d'Orient Adrien-Maisonneuve.
