= Ben Hmida Mosque =

Mosque in Tunis, Tunisia

- جامع بن حميدة
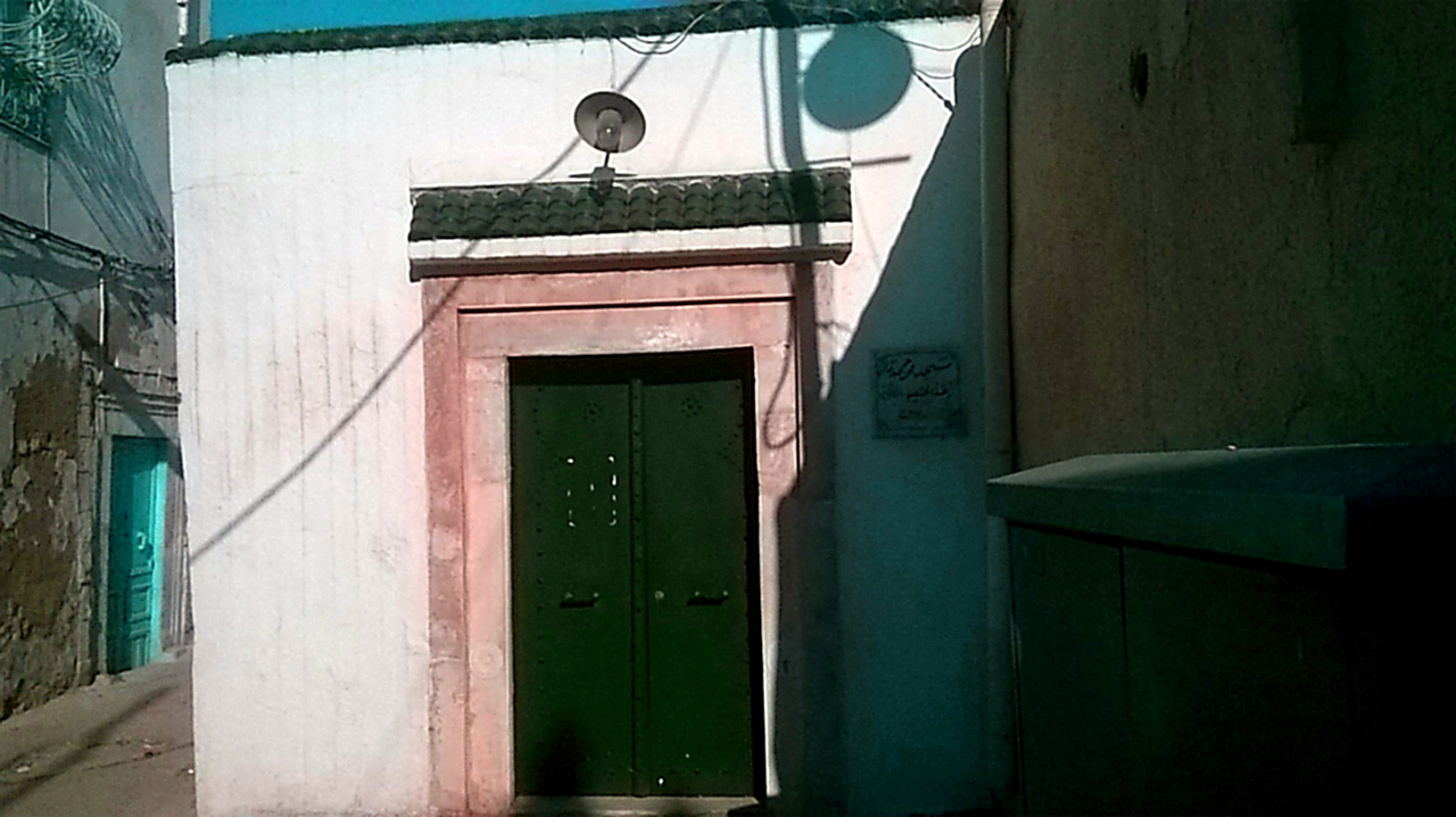

- Location within Tunisia

Religion
- Affiliation: Sunni Islam
- Ecclesiastical or organizational status: Mosque
- Status: Active

Location
- Location: 2 El Halib, Bab Souika, Tunis
- Country: Tunisia
- Interactive map of Ben Hmida Mosque
- Coordinates: 36°48′21″N 10°09′45″E

Architecture
- Type: Mosque architecture
- Completed: 1009 CE

The Ben Hmida Mosque (Arabic: جامع بن حميدة) is a Sunni mosque located in the Bab Souika suburb of the north of the medina of Tunis, in Tunisia.

The mosque is located in 2 El Halib dead-end or the milk "dead-end", near Bab Lakouas, one of the medina's gates that disappeared.

== History ==
According to the commemorative plaque at the entrance of the mosque, it was built in 1009 CE, during the era of the zirid dynasty that ruled the Maghreb between 972 and 1014 CE.

== Gallery ==
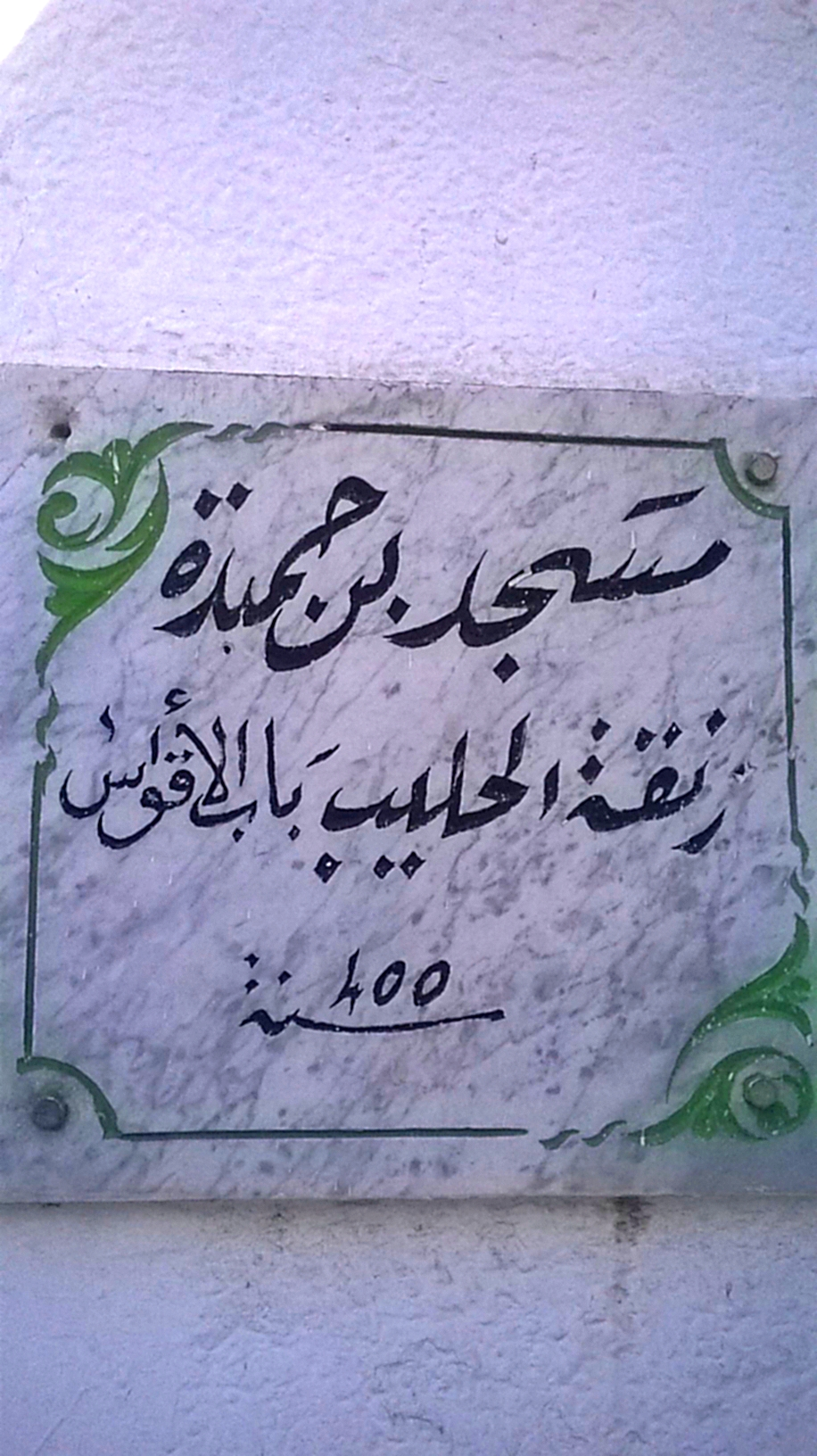
Commemorative plaque of the mosque
