= Ziri ibn Manad =

Founder of the Zirid dynasty (died 971)

Zīrī ibn Manād (Arabic: زيري بن مناد; died in 971) was the founder of the Zirid dynasty in the Maghreb.

== Name ==
Ziri ibn Manad's name like much of the Zirid dynasty is of Berber origin. The name Ziri means "moonlight". "Ibn Manad" means son of Manad with Manad coming from the root *MND which is the preterite of the verb "he is" as in our "being".

== Life ==
Ziri ibn Mennad was a chief of the Takalata branch of the Sanhajah confederation, to which the Kutama Berbers belonged, located in the present-day Algeria. As an ally of the Fatimids, he assisted in the defeat of the rebellion of Abu Yazid (943–947) by Caliph al-Mansur bi-Nasr Allah, and was rewarded with the governorship of the western provinces, an area that roughly corresponds with modern Algeria north of the Sahara.

Ziri had the residence of Achir built south of the future site of Algiers in 935. He summoned masons and joiners from M'sila and Tubna to build the fortress, which, once finished, was filled with scholars, merchants and lawyers. He minted money and began to pay his troops in cash. His son Buluggin ibn Ziri founded the cities of Algiers, Miliana and Médéa (Lamdiya), and rebuilt the settlements destroyed in the revolt.

In 959 Ziri successfully conquered Fez (in present-day Morocco). On his return home he paraded the amir of Fez as well as the “Caliph” Ibn Wasul of Sijilmasa in cages in a very humiliating manner.

== Death ==
Ziri ibn Manad was killed in battle against the lord of M'sila (Ja'far Ibn 'Ali al-Andalusi al-Maghrawi) in June-July 971. He was succeeded as governor by his son Buluggin ibn Ziri, who in 972 became Viceroy of Ifriqiya (972–984) when the Fatimids transferred their court to Egypt.
