= Battle of Haydaran =

Decisive Armed conflict between the Arab tribes of Banu Hilal against the Zirids

- Part of the Hilalian invasion of Ifriqiya
Date	14 April 1052
Location	Haydaran, Tunisia
Result	Decisive Hilalian victory: The road to Kairouan is opened.

Belligerents
Banu Hilal	Zirid dynasty

Commanders and leaders
Unknown	Al-Mu'izz ibn Badis

Strength
3,000 cavalrymen	30,000

Casualties and losses
Light	Heavy

The Battle of Haydaran (Arabic: معركة حيدران) or the Battle of Jabal Haydaran (Arabic: معركة جبل حيدران) was an armed conflict which took place on 14 April 1052 between the Arab tribes of Banu Hilal and the Zirid dynasty in modern-day South-East Tunisia, it was part of the Hilalian invasion of Ifriqiya.

== Background ==
Since the Zirids declared independence from the Fatimids and recognised the Abbasids as caliphs in 972, relations have been strained between the two. As retaliation, the Fatimids sent devastating Hilalian invasions into the Maghreb to punish the Zirids and Hammadids. On the way to Ifriqiya, the Hilalians devastated Cyrenica in 1050.

== Battle ==
The Hilalians and Zirids met in Haydaran in modern-day south-east Tunisia, it opposed 3,000 Arab cavalry of the Banu Hilal against the Zirid Emir Al-Mu'izz ibn Badis. The Hilalians, greatly outnumbered, decisively defeated the Sanhaja Zirids, forcing them to retreat, opening the road to Kairouan for the Hilalians, which would eventually be captured in 1057.

== Aftermath ==
As a result of the Hilalian victory, the Hilalians would eventually capture Kairouan in 1057, forcing the Zirids to move their capital to Mahdia.

The Hilalians would even expel the Zenatas from southern Ifriqiya. By the end of the invasion, the Zirids and Hammadids would lose most of their territory, being limited to a small coastal strip on the coast of Ifriqiya.
