= Al-Mansur ibn Buluggin =

Tenth-century ruler in north Africa

- Zirid emir of Ifriqiya
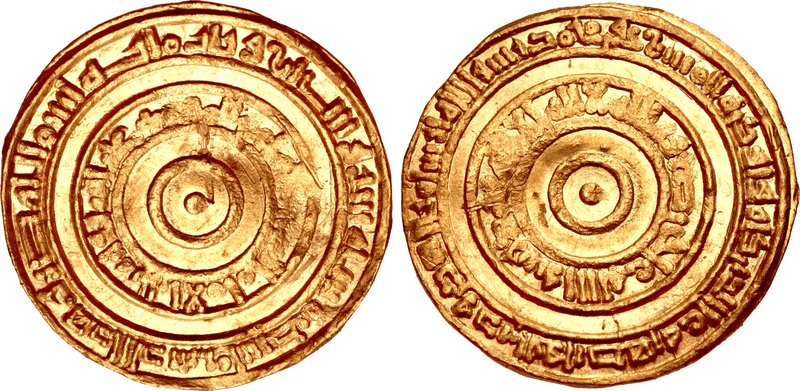
- Dinar of al-'Aziz billah, AH 366 (AD 976-977)
- Reign: 25 May 984 - 26 March 996
- Coronation: 984
- Predecessor: Buluggin ibn Ziri
- Successor: Badis ibn al-Mansur
- Born: Al-Mansur ibn Buluggin
- Died: 26 March 996
- Issue: Badis ibn al-Mansur; Saïda bint Mansour; Karama ibn al-Mansur (Commander under his brother Badis during the Hammadid–Zirid War).
- Father: Buluggin ibn Ziri
- Religion: Islam

al-Mansûr ibn Buluggin (Arabic: المنصور بن بولوغين) (died 26 March 996) was the second ruler of the Zirids in Ifriqiya (r. 984–995).

== Life ==
Al-Mansur succeeded his father Buluggin ibn Ziri (r. 972–984) in Ifriqiya. Despite further campaigns by the Zirids against the Berber tribes of Morocco, he was forced to abandon the attempt at a permanent conquest of Fez and Sijilmasa. Still, he was able to consolidate Zirid rule in the central Maghreb when he defeated the Kutama Berbers in 988, and when his brother Hammad ibn Buluggin, as governor of Algeria, drove the Zanata Berbers into Morocco. The vassal relationship to the Fatimids became increasingly loose under al-Mansur, not least because their focus of attention was on the overthrow of the Abbasids in Iraq.

He was succeeded by Badis ibn al-Mansur (996–1016).

Preceded by Buluggin ibn Ziri	Zirid emir of Ifriqiya; 984–996	Succeeded by Badis ibn al-Mansur
