= Badis ibn al-Mansur =

Zirid ruler

- Emir of Zirids
- Reign: 26 March 996 – 10 May 1016
- Predecessor: Al-Mansur ibn Buluggin
- Successor: Al-Mu'izz ibn Badis
- Born: 14 August 984; Achir
- Died: 10 May 1016; Qal'a Beni Hammad
- Issue: Al-Mu'izz ibn Badis; Umm al 'Ulu
Names
- Abū Manād Bādīs Nāṣir al-Dawla ben Mansur ben Buluggin ben Ziri
- Dynasty: Zirids
- Father: al-Mansur ibn Buluggin

Bādīs ibn al-Manṣūr (Arabic: باديس بن المنصور; 14 August 984 - 10 May 1016), known fully as ʾAbū Manād Bādīs Nāṣir al-Dawla (أبو مناد باديس ناصر الدولة), was the third ruler of the Zirids in Ifriqiya from 996 to 1016.

Badis ibn Mansur succeeded his father al-Mansur ibn Buluggin (r. 984–996) as viceroy of Ifriqiya on 8 April 996. At the outset of his reign he faced a revolt by the Zenata Berbers, who threatened the Zirid domains from Tiaret to Tripoli. To focus on them, he left the eastern parts of his emirate in the hands of a deputy. Throughout his reign, Badis also had to fend off Fatimid forays into Tripolitania.

He stayed very close to his overlords, the Fatimids of Egypt, on account of a power struggle amongst the Zirids - his right to rule was challenged by his great-uncle Zawi ibn Ziri, who was ultimately driven into Andalusia where he founded the Zirid dynasty of Granada (1012–1090).

By 1001, Badis had secured his position with a convincing victory over the Zenata, their allies the Maghrawa, and Zawi ibn Ziri. This success was largely due to another great-uncle, Hammad ibn Buluggin, who defeated another Zenatan attack in 1004/5, and in 1007/8 established the castle of Qal'a. In 1014, Hammad rose in revolt, and Badis marched against him in May 1015. On 17 October, Badis won a great victory over Hammad at Chelif, but was unable to take Qal'a, being forced to lay siege to the fortress instead. The siege was still ongoing when Badis died, on 10 May 1016.

His death made the separation of the Hammadid state from the Zirids inevitable, while the anti-Shi'a riots that broke out in Tunis during his last year signalled the eventual break between the Zirids and their Fatimid overlords under Badis' son and successor, al-Mu'izz. His sister, Saïda bint Mansour, was appointed regent of his son as he ascended the throne a minor.

== Notes ==
Preceded by Al-Mansur ibn Buluggin	Zirid emir of Ifriqiya; 996–1016	Succeeded by Al-Mu'izz ibn Badis
