= Buluggin ibn Ziri =

- Emir of Maghreb
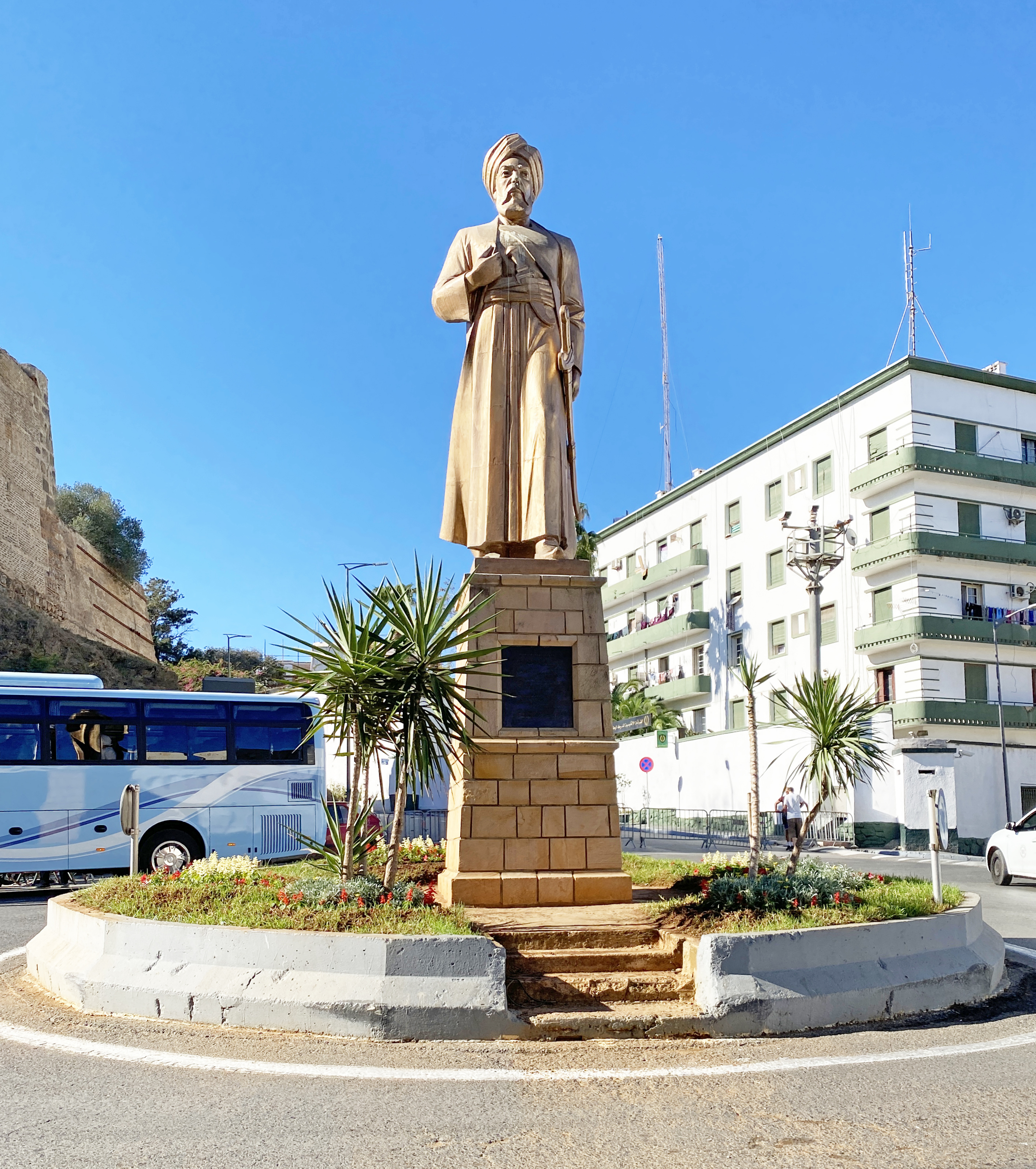
- A statue of Buluggin ibn Ziri on the heights of the Casbah of Algiers
- Reign: 2 October 972 – 25 May 984
- Successor: Al-Mansur ibn Buluggin
- Born: Titteri region (present-day Algeria)
- Died: 25 May 984 in Sijilmasa or Ouarekcen
- Issue: Al-Mansur ibn Buluggin; Hammad ibn Buluggin; Ibrahim ibn Buluggin; Yattufat ibn Buluggin
Names
- Abu'l-Futuh Sayf al-Dawla Buluggin ibn Ziri ibn Manad al-Sanhaji
- Dynasty: Zirids
- Father: Ziri ibn Manad
- Religion: Islam

Buluggin ibn Ziri (often transliterated Bologhine; in full: ʾAbū al Futūḥ Sayf ad Dawlah Bulukīn ibn Zīrī ibn Manād aṣ Ṣanhājī; Arabic: أبو الفتوح سيف الدولة بلكين بن زيري بن مناد الصنهاجي; died 25 May 984) was the first leader (r. 972–984) of the Sanhaja Berber dynasty of Zirids, serving as viceroy of Ifriqiya under the Fatimid Caliphs, and founding a dynasty that continued to rule the region after his death.

Founder of the cities of Médéa, Miliana and, above all, Algiers, Bologhine, a suburb in the city of Algiers, is named after him.

== Biography ==
Buluggin was born in the region of Titteri, in what is now Algeria. While his father Ziri ibn Menad was emir of the central Maghreb, Buluggin ibn Ziri founded the city of Algiers on the site of the ancient Roman Icosium in 960, as well as Médéa and Miliana. He rebuilt the villages destroyed by various revolts.

Following his father's death in a battle against Kharidjite Berber tribes in 971, the Fatimid Caliph Al-Mu'izz li-Din Allah appointed Buluggin ibn Ziri as emir of the Maghreb on 2 October 972 (20 Dhu al Hijjah 361 AH). In addition to the attributions of his father, he received the regions of Zab and M'Sila that the defector Jaʿfar ibn ʿAlī ruled. The honours bestowed on him would provoke the jealousy of the Kutamas. Al-Mu'izz li-Din Allah left the governance of Sicily to the Kalbids and Tripoli to Abd Allah ibn Yakhlof Al Kutami. Buluggin continued the fight against the Zenatas. The Maghrawa asked for the help of the Umayyads of Cordoba to take back their territory and their cities. Buluggin then took control of almost all of the Maghreb under orders of the Fatimid Caliph. Buluggin defeated the Maghrawa, the Hawwaras (branch of the Branis), the Nefzawas (branch of the Zenatas), and the Mazata. The prisoners were resettled in great numbers in the settlement of Ashir.

The Fatimids transferred their court from Mahdia to Cairo. Buluggin was then appointed viceroy of Ifriqiya with Kairouan as its capital. The Fatimids had taken the treasury and fleet with them to Egypt, so the first priority of the Zirid government was to consolidate its rule. However, the loss of the fleet meant loss of control over the Kalbids in Sicily. Buluggin took Fez, Sijilmasa, and most of Morocco to the Atlantic coast. During a campaign in Morocco, he fought against the Bargawata. The Caliphate of Córdoba was, however, able to retain the fortresses of Ceuta and Tangiers. Nevertheless, Buluggin remained a vassal of the Fatimids, to whom he had to pay tribute, and he remained surrounded by advisors who were there to support him as much as to watch over him. The Fatimids took with them wealth and military equipment. The absolute priority of the Zirids was therefore to strengthen their power, but the displacement of the Fatimid fleet towards Egypt made the conservation of the Kalbide territories in Sicily impossible.

Bologhine Ziri received from the Caliph the titles of Abu al-Futuh, "Father of Victories," and Sayf ad-Dawla, "Sword of Empire". In 977, Abu Mansur Nizar al-Aziz Billah, the successor of Al-Muizz li-Dîn Allah, attributed to Bologhine the cities of Tripoli, Ajdabiya, and Sirte in addition to his previous attributions. He conquered Fez, Sijilmassa, but stopped before Ceuta. After seeing the square, which he considered impregnable, and the reinforcements of the Zenatas coming from Andalusia by sea, he turned back. He punished the sovereign of the Barghawata, who was declared a prophet, in an expedition in 979 in which he brought back a large number of Moroccan slaves; while his lieutenant paraded them in the streets, the people of Ifriqiya were shocked as they had never seen such a large number of slaves before. Little is known about the personal life of Buluggin. However, chroniclers state that prior to his rule of the Maghreb, he had 400 concubines and seventeen children. On Sunday, 25 May 984 (21 Dhu al Hijjah 373 AH), Bologhine died, and his son Al-Mansur succeeded him.

Preceded by Al-Mu'izz li-Din Allah as Fatimid caliph	Zirid emir of Ifriqiya; 972–984	Succeeded by Al-Mansur ibn Buluggin
