= Hammad ibn Buluggin =

Emir
- Reign: 1014 – August 1029
- Predecessor: office established
- Successor: Qaid ibn Hammad
- Born: before 972
- Died: August 1029; Tazmalt, province of Béjaia, Algeria
- Burial: Qal'at Bani Hammad
- Issue: Qaid ibn Hammad; Abdallah ibn Hammad; Youssef ibn Hammad; Ouighlan ibn Hammad; Muhammad ibn Hammad; Alnas ibn Hammad
- Dynasty: Hammadid dynasty
- Father: Buluggin ibn Ziri
- Religion: Islam

Hammad ibn Buluggin (Arabic: حمّاد بن بلكين, romanized: Ḥammād ibn Bulukkīn; died August 1029) was the first ruler of the Hammadid dynasty in what is now Algeria (1014–1029).

== Life ==
After the death of his father Buluggin ibn Ziri, al-Mansur ibn Buluggin (984–995), Hammad's brother, became the head of the Zirid dynasty in Ifriqiya, and installed Hammad as governor of the central Maghreb (grossly corresponding to the modern northern Algeria). He took on the Zanata tribes and eventually drove them into what is now modern-day Morocco. In 1007 Hammad founded the residence of al-Qala ("the Fortress") in the Hodna mountains west of Setif and embarked on an extensive building programme, which included a palace and mosque that became famous amongst contemporaries.

Following this Hammad gained ever more influence in the western Zirid realm. In 1014 he adopted Sunni Islam, declared his independence from the Zirids and recognised the Sunni Abbasids in Baghdad as being the rightful Caliphs (not the Shia Fatimids in Egypt, on whose behalf the Zirids ruled). Although there was initially conflict with the Zirids, in 1016 they were forced to conclude a ceasefire, and in 1018 they recognised the independence of the Hammadids. In September - October 1024, Umm al 'Ulu, Al-Mu'izz ibn Badis's sister married Abdallah, son of Hammad ibn Buluggin. They held a majestuous wedding on the 8th and the 9th of October 1024. She later died in 1053-1054 (445 AH).

The successor of Hammad was Qaid ibn Hammad (1029–1054), under whom relations with the Fatimids were re-established.

New title	Hammadid ruler 1014–1028	Succeeded by Qaid ibn Hammad
