= Al-Mu'izz ibn Badis =

Zirid ruler

- Emir of Zirids
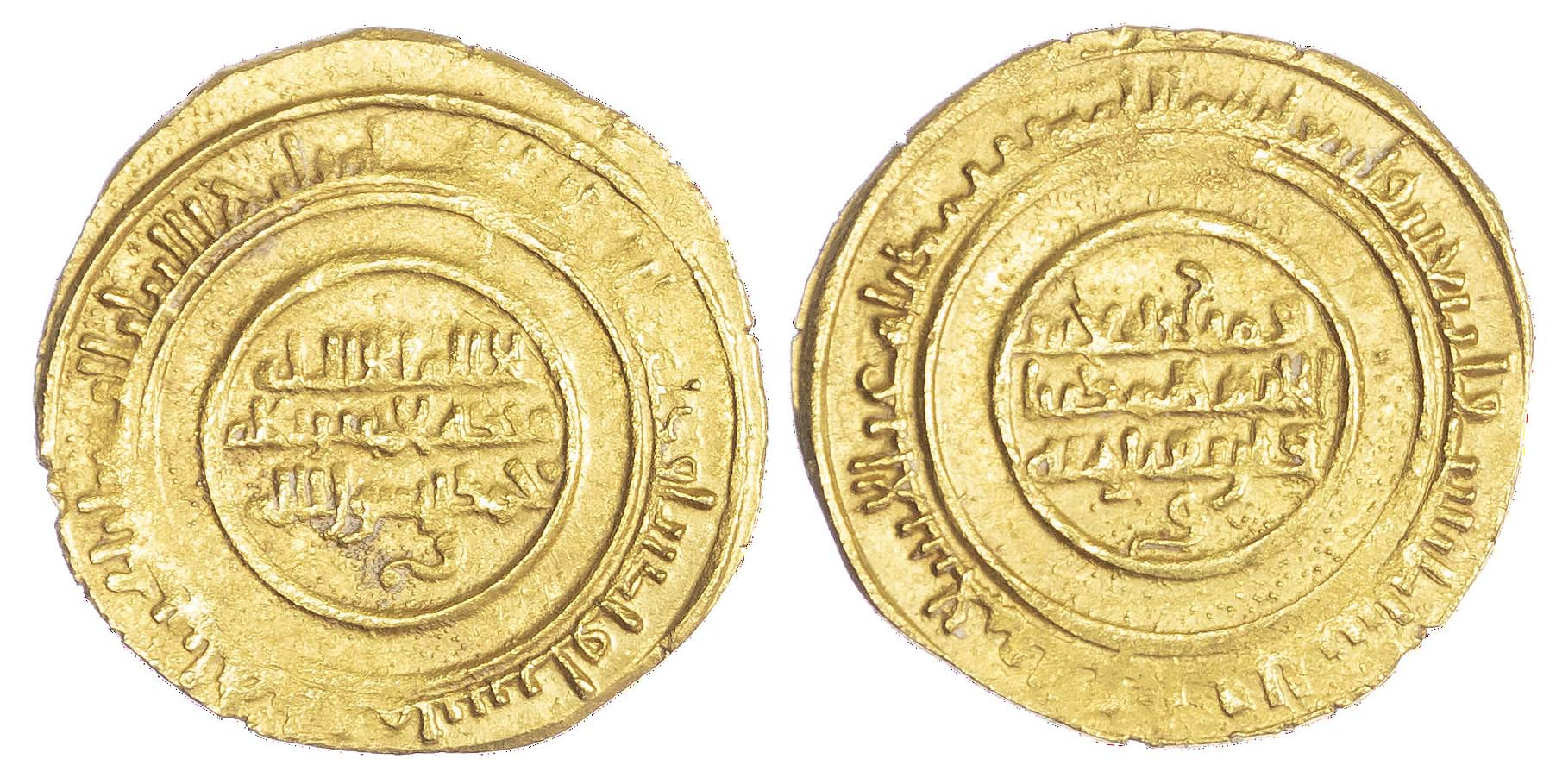
- Dirham in the name Al-Mu'izz ibn Badis
- Reign: 13 May 1016 – 2 September 1062
- Predecessor: Badis ibn al-Mansur
- Successor: Tamim ibn al-Mu'izz
- Born: 19 January 1008; Mansouria
- Died: 2 September 1062 (aged 54); Mahdia
- Spouse: Umm Yusuf Zulaykha
- Issue: Tamim ibn al-Mu'izz; Nizar ibn al-Mu'izz (dead January 1047, heir apparent); Abdallah ibn al-Mu'izz; Ali ibn al-Mu'izz; Umar ibn al-Mu'izz; Hammad ibn al-Mu'izz; Buluggin ibn al-Mu'izz; Hamama ibn al-Mu'izz; Al Mansur ibn al-Mu'izz; Kebbab ibn al-Mu'izz (dead as an infant); Abu al Qasim ibn al-Mu'izz (dead as an infant, heir apparent after death of Nizar)
Names
- al Mu'izz ben Bādīs ben Mansur ben Buluggin ben Ziri
- Dynasty: Zirids
- Father: Badis ibn al-Mansur

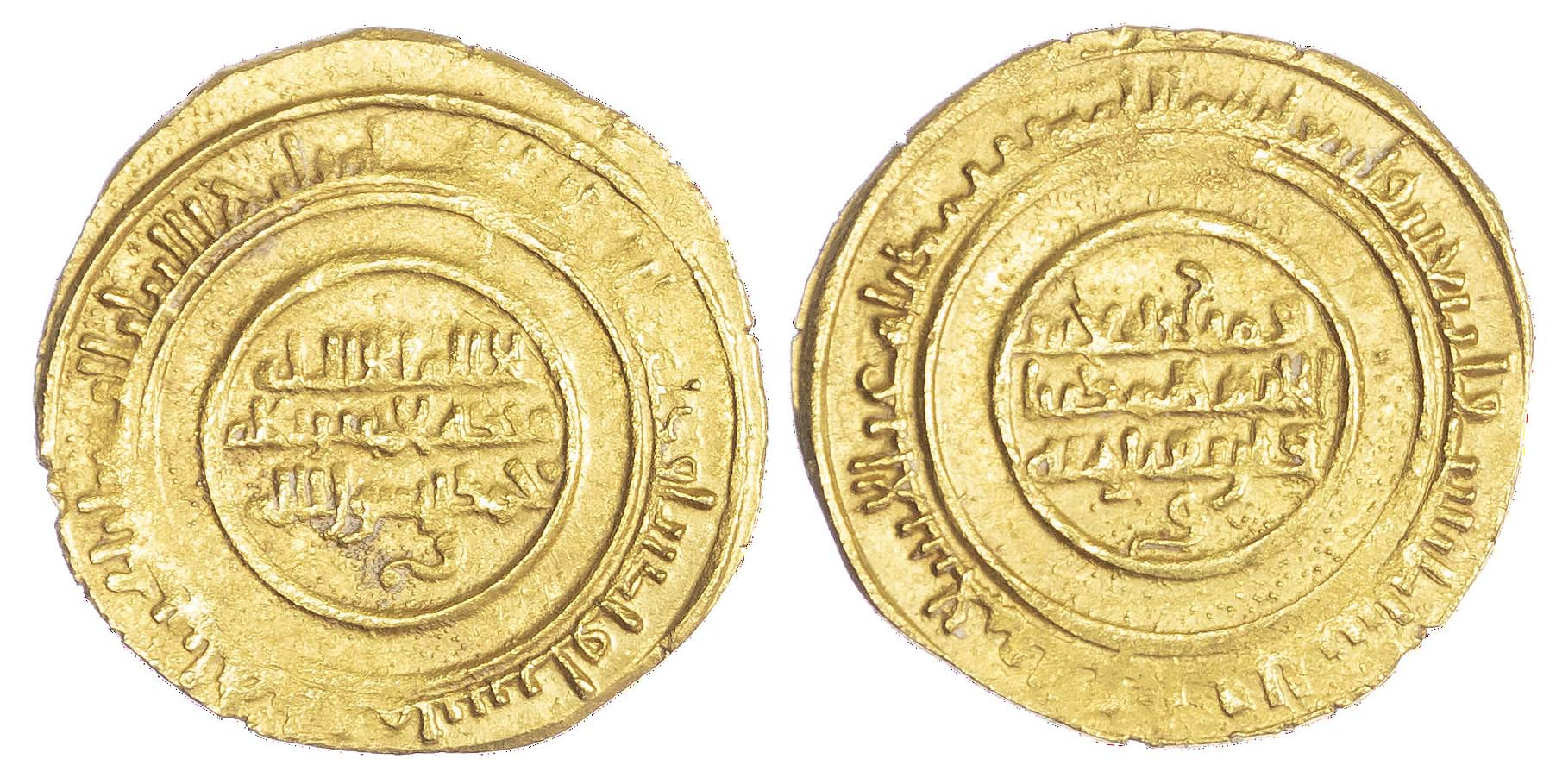
Gold dinar minted in the name of al-Mu'izz

Al-Muʿizz ibn Bādīs (Arabic: المعز بن باديس; 19 January 1008 – 2 September 1062) was the fourth ruler of the Zirids in Ifriqiya, reigning from 1016 to 1062. His regent was his paternal aunt Saïda bint Mansur until he reached majority.

== Name ==
Ibn Khallikan wrote that the name "al-Mu'izz" was ordinarily an epithet (laqab), but in the case of al-Mu'izz ibn Badis it seems to have been his given name (ism). Ibn Khallikan wrote that he had searched in various books and consulted with scholars from North Africa in an attempt to determine whether al-Mu'izz had a different given name, but he never found any; in the absence of any suggestion to the contrary, he concluded that "al-Mu'izz" must have been his given name.

== Political career ==
According to Ibn Khallikan, al-Mu'izz ibn Badis was born at al-Mansuriya on 19 January 1008 (7 Jumada al-Awwal, 398 AH).

Al-Muizz ascended the throne as a minor following the death of his father Badis ibn Mansur, with his aunt, Umm Mallal, acting as regent. According to Ibn Khallikan, al-Mu'izz's inauguration was held at al-Muhammadiya on 13 May 1016 (3 Dhu al-Hijja, 406 AH). In 1016 there was a bloody revolt in Ifriqiya in which the Fatimid residence Al-Mansuriya was completely destroyed and 20,000 Shiites were massacred. The unrest forced a ceasefire in the conflict with the Hammadids of Algeria, and their independence was finally recognized in 1018.

In September - October 1024, Umm al 'Ulu, Al-Mu'izz ibn Badis's sister married Abdallah, son of Hammad ibn Buluggin. They held a majestuous wedding on the 8th and the 9th of October 1024. She later died in 1053-1054 (445 AH).

Al Mu'izz married Umm Yusuf Zulaykha in 423 AH (April 1022 - March 1023). Their wedding day was described as grandiose and Al Mu'izz was remarkably in love with Umm Yusuf.

Al-Muizz took over the government in 1022 following the overthrow of his aunt. The relationship with the Fatimids was strained, when in 1027 they supported a revolt of the Zanatas in Tripolitania which resulted in permanent loss of control of the region. His son Abdallah shortly ruled Sicily in 1038-1040, after intervening with a Zirid army in the civil war that broke out in the island.

The political turmoil notwithstanding, the general economic wellbeing initially made possible an extensive building programme. However, the kingdom found itself in economic crisis in the 1040s, reflected in currency devaluation, epidemic and famine. This may have been related to the high level of tribute which the Zirids were compelled to pay annually to the Fatimids (one million gold dinars a year).

When al-Muizz (under the influence of Sunni jurists in Kairouan, growing Sunni public pressure in his realm and a violent backlash against the Shi'ite minority) recognised the Abbasids in Baghdad as rightful Caliphs in 1045 and adopted Sunni orthodoxy, the break with the Fatimids was complete. He even denounced the Fatimids and their followers as heretics in newly minted coinage.

The Fatimids then sent a military campaign composed of Bedouin tribes of the Banu Hilal and the Banu Sulaym from Egypt to Ifriqiya. The invasion of the Bedouin (1051–1052) led to great hardship after the defeat at Jabal Haydaran, severely impacting agriculture in Ifriqiya. The Fatimids dispatched Makin al-Dawla to rally the Bedouin invaders and duly besiege al-Muizz in Kairouan and conquer Gabes and much of Ifriqiya’s hinterlands in 1053–1054. The conquest of Kairouan in 1057 resulted in further anarchy. The Zirids lost control over the hinterland and were only able to retain the coastal areas, the capital being moved to Mahdia. With the growth of Bedouin Emirates and the continuing insecurity inland, the economy of Ifriqiya looked increasingly towards the Mediterranean, with the result the coastal cities grew in importance through maritime trade and piracy.

According to Kitab ad-Dawla Sanhajiya, Al-Mu'izz died on 2 September 1062 (24 Sha'ban, 454 AH) of some sort of liver disease. He was succeeded by his son Tamim ibn Muizz.

== Literary career ==
He is usually thought to be the author of the famous Kitab `umdat al-kuttab wa `uddat dhawi al-albab (Staff of the Scribes). It is divided into twelve chapters, writing, amongst other things, on the excellence of the pen, on the preparation of types of inks, such as colored and metallic inks (including ones prepared from silver filings and alcohol), the coloring of dyes and mixtures, secret writing, the making of paper and Arabic gum and glue.

Ibn Sharaf and Ibn Rashīq were rival poets at his court. He is said to have stoked their rivalry.

== See also ==
- Qalʿat Darjin

Preceded by Badis ibn al-Mansur	Zirid emir of Ifriqiya; 1016–1062	Succeeded by Tamim ibn al-Mu'izz
