= List of people from Boumerdès Province =

The following is a list of notable people born in or associated with the Algerian region of Boumerdès Province within Kabylia.

== People ==
The province was the birthplace of the following people.

=== A ===
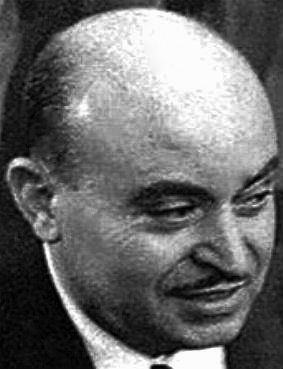
Abderrahmane Farès

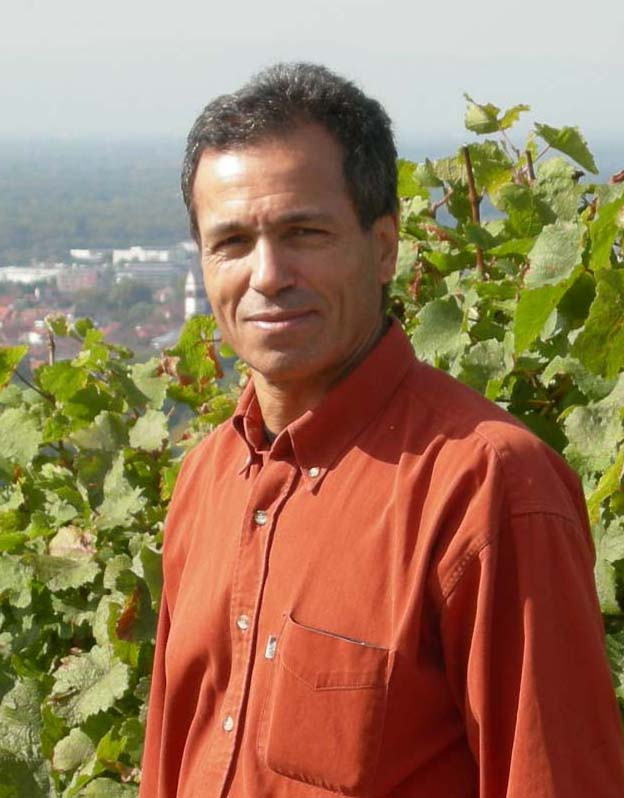
Hocine Ziani

- Abdelhafid Benchabla, Algerian boxer.
- Abdelkader Zerrar, Algerian footballer.
- Abdenour Boushaki, Algerian politician.
- Abderrahmane Abdelli, Algerian artist.
- Abderrahmane Benhamida, Algerian politician.
- Abderrahmane Boushaki, Algerian leader.
- Abderrahmane Farès, Algerian politician.
- Abderrahmane Hammad, Algerian athlete.
- Abderrahman Ibrir, Algerian footballer.
- Adel Djerrar, Algerian footballer.
- Ahmed Bourenane, Algerian politician.
- Ahmed Hadhoum, Algerian politician.
- Ahmed Mahsas, Algerian politician.
- Ali Boushaki, Algerian theologian.
- Ali Bouyahiaoui, Algerian militant.
- Ali Laskri, Algerian politician.
- Ali Rial, Algerian footballer.
- Amine ibn El Boushaki, Algerian judoka.

=== B ===
- Boualem Boukacem, Algerian artist.
- Brahim Boushaki, Algerian theologian.

=== C ===
- Cheikh Boumerdassi, Algerian theologian.

=== D ===
- Dahmane Deriche, Algerian politician.
- Dahmane Deriche, Algerian artist.

=== F ===
- Farid Ishak Boushaki, Algerian academician.
- Fatma Zohra Zamoum, Algerian writer.
- Feriel Boushaki, Algerian artist.
- Firmus, Berber leader.
- Fodil Mezali, Algerian journalist.

=== G ===
- Gildo, Berber leader.

=== H ===
- Habib Ayyoub, Algerian writer.
- Hocine Mezali, Algerian journalist.
- Hocine Soltani, Algerian boxer.
- Hocine Ziani, Algerian artist.

=== L ===
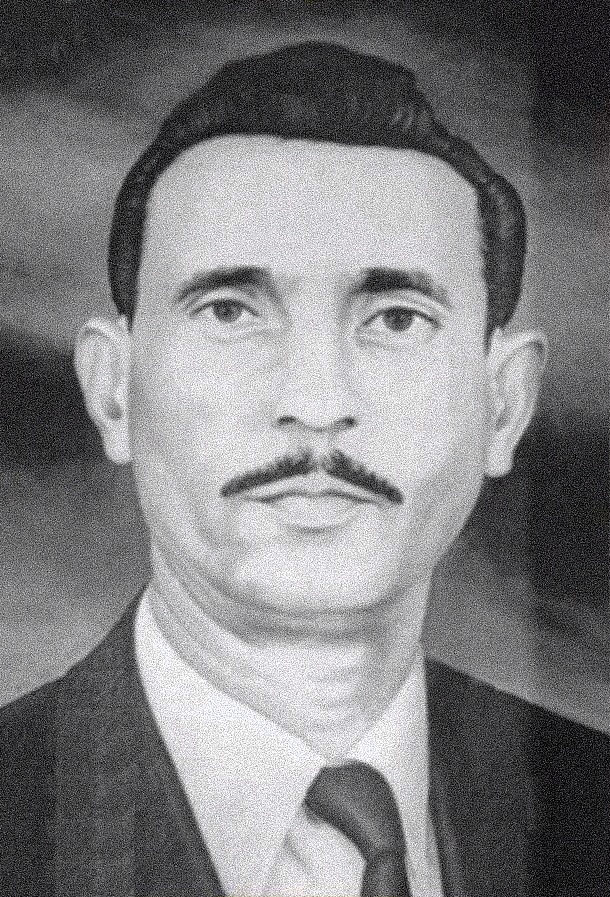
Lyès Deriche

- Lamine Abid, Algerian footballer.
- Lounés Bendahmane, Algerian footballer.
- Lyès Deriche, Algerian leader.

=== M ===
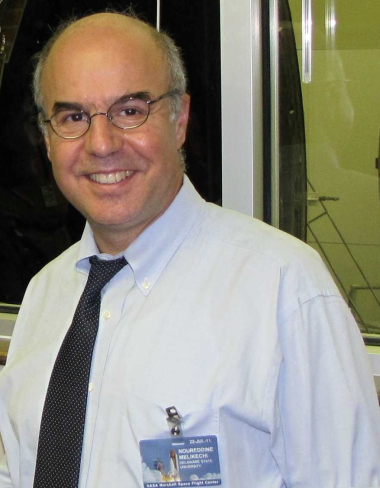
Noureddine Melikechi

- Maamar Bettayeb, Algerian academician.
- Mascezel, Berber leader.
- Mohamed Aïchaoui, Algerian journalist.
- Mohamed Allalou, Algerian boxer.
- Mohamed Arkab, Algerian politician.
- Mohamed ben Zamoum, Algerian leader.
- Mohamed Bouisri, Algerian politician.
- Mohamed Boumerdassi, Algerian artist.
- Mohamed Bourenane, Algerian politician.
- Mohamed Bouyahiaoui, Algerian militant.
- Mohamed Cherak, Algerian journalist.
- Mohamed Deriche, Algerian politician.
- Mohamed Deriche, Algerian academician.
- Mohamed Flissi, Algerian boxer.
- Mohamed Hassaïne, Algerian journalist.
- Mohamed Hattab, Algerian politician.
- Mohamed Mechkarini, Algerian militant.
- Mohamed Missouri, Algerian boxer.
- Mohamed Nassim Boushaki, Algerian academician.
- Mohamed Rahmoune, Algerian politician.
- Mohamed Seghir Boushaki, Algerian politician.
- Mokhtar Hasbellaoui, Algerian academician.
- Mustapha Ishak Boushaki, Algerian academician.
- Mustapha Toumi, Algerian songwriter.

=== N ===
- Nadia Boumerdassi, Algerian artist.
- Noureddine Melikechi, Algerian physicist.
- Nubel, Berber leader.

=== O ===
- Omar ben Zamoum, Algerian leader.
- Omar Fetmouche, Algerian artist.
- Othmane Senadjki, Algerian journalist.

=== R ===
- Rabah Rahmoune, Algerian politician.
- Rachid Deriche, Algerian academician.
- Rachid Mimouni, Algerian writer.
- Rachid Nadji, Algerian footballer.
- Raïs Hamidou, Algerian privateer.
- Ratiba Tariket, Algerian judokate.
- Rezki Zerarti, Algerian artist.

=== S ===
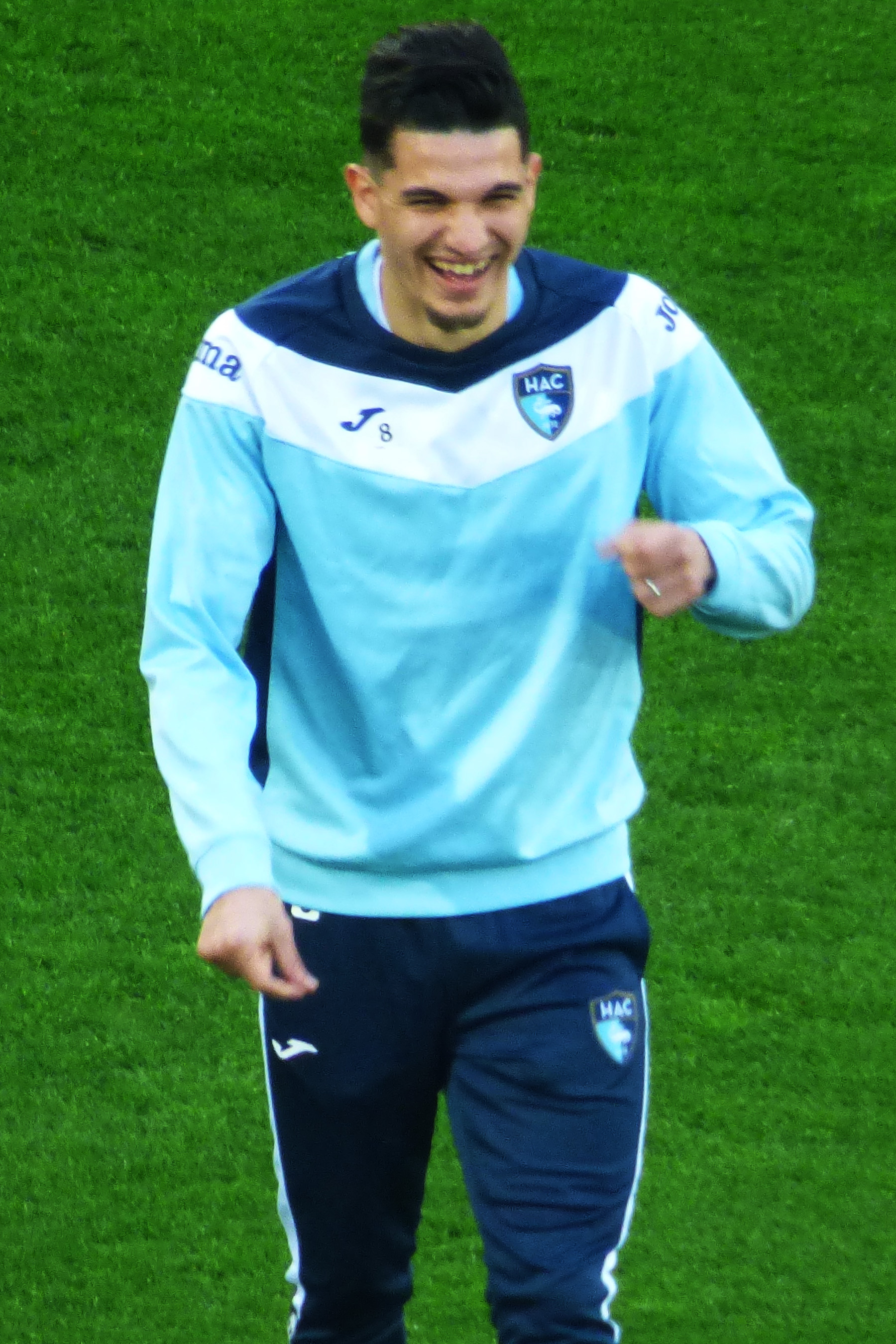
Zinedine Ferhat

- Salah Bouchatal, Algerian politician.
- Salem Anou, Algerian politician.
- Salem Mouhamou, Algerian politician.
- Shahnez Boushaki, Algerian basketball player.
- Sidi Abd al-Rahman al-Tha'alibi, Algerian theologian.
- Sidi Amar Cherif, Algerian theologian.
- Sidi Boushaki, Algerian theologian.
- Smaïl Bouarous, Algerian marathon runner.
- Soufiane Lahouassa, Algerian footballer.

=== T ===
- Tarik Boushaki, Algerian academician.

=== W ===
- Walid Derrardja, Algerian footballer.

=== Y ===
- Yahia Boushaki (Shahid), Algerian politician.

=== Z ===
- Zinedine Ferhat, Algerian footballer.

== See also ==
- List of Algerian people
- List of Algerian artists
- List of Algerian muftis
- List of Algerian musicians
- List of Algerian women artists
- List of Algerian women writers
- List of Algerian writers
- List of Muslim saints of Algeria
