= Issers (disambiguation) =

Issers is a town and commune in Algeria.

It may also refer to:

- Issers District, a district in Algeria.
- Issers River, a river in Algeria.
- First Battle of the Issers (1837), a battle during the French conquest of Algeria.
- Issers bombing (2008), a terrorist attack in Algeria.
