= Malikization of the Maghreb =

Adoption of Maliki Sunni Islam in the Maghreb

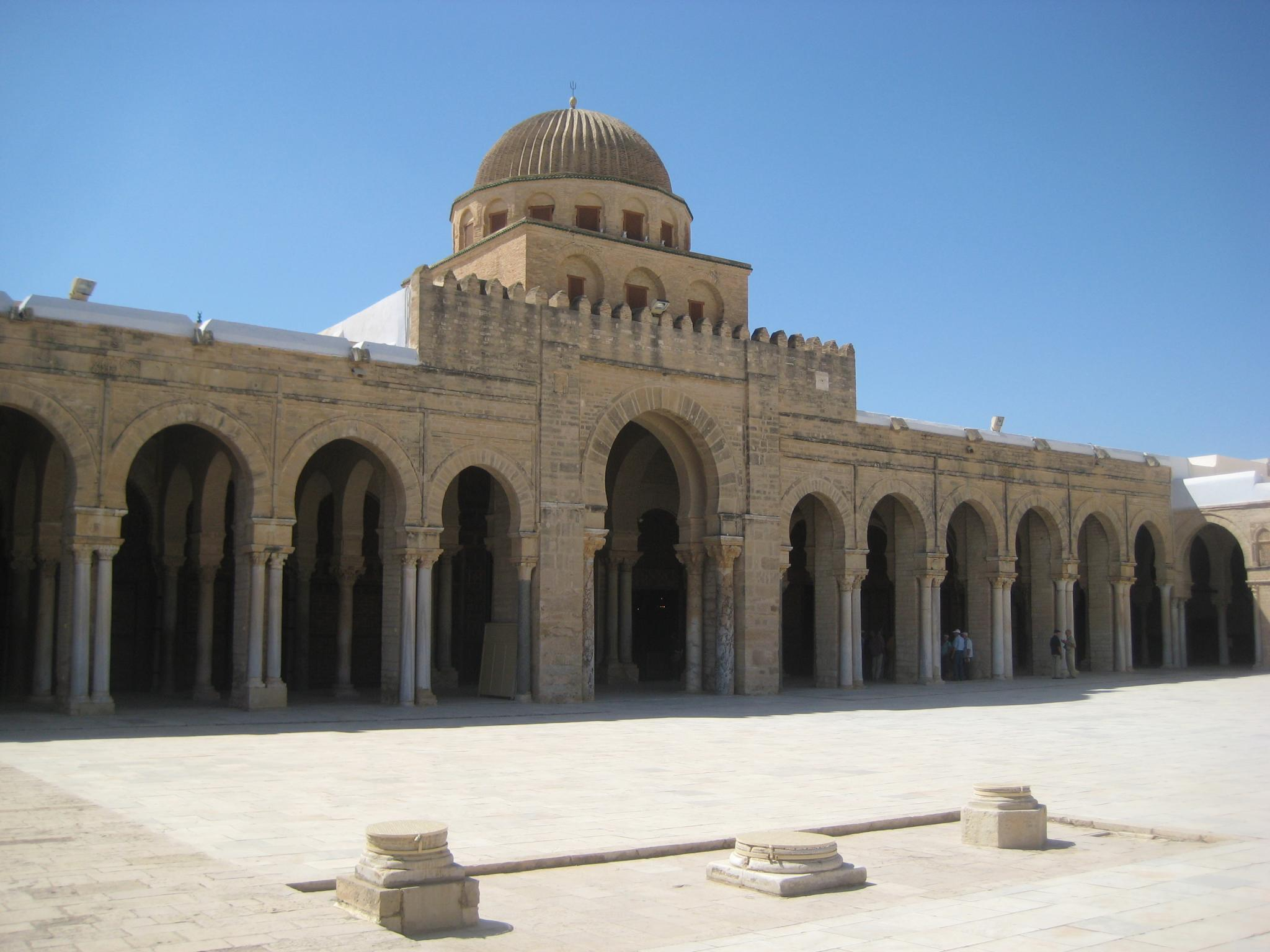
The Great Mosque of Kairouan or the Mosque of Uqba had the reputation, since the 9th century, of being one of the most important centers of the Maliki school.

The Malikization of the Maghreb was the process of encouraging the adoption of the Maliki school (founded by Malik ibn Anas) of Sunni Islam in the Maghreb, especially in the 11th and 12th centuries, to the detriment of Shia and Kharijite inhabitants of the Maghreb. The process occurred as Maliki scholars increasingly gained influence, resulting in the widespread acceptance of the Maliki legal school and the subsequent marginalization of other forms of Islam. Malikism was considered a more conservative and mainstream variant of Sunni Islam.

== Background ==
Following the Muslim conquest of the Maghreb, various Islamic sects began to develop in the region. Although the majority of the inhabitants of Ifriqiya adhered to Sunni Islam, opposition to the Umayyad and Abbasid Caliphates began to emerge in the western and central Maghreb. In these areas, Zaydi Shi'ism, Isma'ili Shi'ism, Kharijite Ibadism and Kharijite Sufrism were all well-established. The repression and marginalization of political parties in Iraq and the Middle East in the 8th century caused religious missionaries and political dissidents to emigrate to the Maghreb, who converted large populations.

=== Kharijites ===
The Kharijite Ibadi movement reached North Africa by 719, when the missionary Salma ibn Sa'd was sent from the Ibadi jama'a of Basra in Iraq to Kairouan in Ifriqiya, which managed to convert the major Berber tribes of Huwara around Tripoli, in the Nafusa Mountains and the Zenata in western Tripolitania by 740. Kharijism was at the outset the most acceptable form of Islam to the Berbers, primarily due to its emphasis on the equality of all Muslims. Despite this, the belief co-existed with great reverence for Ali's family, which permitted the rise of various Sharifian (direct descendants of Muhammad) dynasties in the Maghreb, such as the Zaydi Shia Idrisid dynasty.

=== Shi'ites ===
The Maghreb historically had a large Shia Arab population, such as the Zaydi Idrisids and the Bedouin tribes of Banu Hilal and Banu Sulaym that emigrated to the Maghreb. In 893, an Arab Shia missionary known as Abu Abdallah al-Shi'i arrived in the Maghreb from Yemen, who subsequently converted the Kutama of northeastern Algeria to Ismaili Shi'ism. These came under the rule of the Fatimid dynasty who organized an army to fight the Mu'tazilite Sunni Aghlabid dynasty of Ifriqiya. After numerous battles against the Aghlabids, the Fatimids emerged victorious in 909 and conquered Ifriqiya, establishing the Fatimid Caliphate. The Idrisids of the western Maghreb (present-day Morocco) have been described as a Zaydi Shia dynasty who attempted to introduce doctrines of Shia Islam in the Maghreb. Having come from the Arabian Peninsula, Idris ibn Abdallah and his descendants had brought with them a form of archaic Shi'ism that was very similar to Zaydism.

=== Mu'tazilite Hanafites ===
The Aghlabid dynasty, which ruled Ifriqiya from 800 to 909 as vassals of the Abbasids, adhered to the Mu'tazilite rationalist doctrine within Hanafi Sunni Islam. Once Mu'tazilism was adopted as the official doctrine of the Abbasid Caliphate of Baghdad during the reign of caliph Al-Ma'mun (813–833), the Aghlabids followed suit and officialized it in Ifriqiya. This was met with opposition from the Maliki majority of Ifriqiya, particularly due to the Mu'tazilite rejection of the orthodox belief that the Qur'an was God's eternal word and therefore uncreated. Although the Aghlabids recognized the political influence of the Maliki religious leaders, they were both unable and unwilling to alter their governmental system to align with their beliefs. The qāḍī (judge) of Kairouan adhered to the Hanafi school and endorsed the concept of Khalq al-Qur'an (createdness of the Qur'an). The Aghlabids consistently favored Iraqis as their higher-ranking judges, while the viziers had affiliations with the Maliki school. Some Malikis were persecuted for rejecting Mu'tazilite beliefs, such as Sahsun, who suffered persecution during the reign of Emir Muhammad I ibn al-Aghlab (841–856) for rejecting the Mu'tazilite concept that the Qur'an was created.

== Malikization ==
Only two centuries after the Muslim conquest of the Maghreb, Malikism became the dominant regional school of Islam. This progressively caused Ibadism to decline and disappear from most areas in the Maghreb. By the mid-tenth century, Kharijism died out in North Africa. Kharijite communities were severely weakened by interconnectedness with the Maliki Umayyad Andalus and the loss of monopoly over the slave trade.

According to Allaoua Amara, the Malikization process started under the Fatimid Caliphate. Additionally, the Hammadids contributed to the process by imposing Malikism in Hodna after founding their capital, the Qal'at Bani Hammad. Ibadi communities in Tahert and Zab had already been weakened by Umayyad military intervention, conversions to Malikism, organization of broader Maliki trading networks, and ultimately, the arrival of the Bedouin Banu Hilal and Banu Sulaym, who forced the Ibadi Berbers into exile.

The Zirid dynasty, based in the Maliki stronghold of Ifriqiya, actively supported the spread of Malikism in the regions they controlled, despite being subject to the sovereignty of the Isma'ili Shia Fatimid Caliphate. In 1016, Malikis in Ifriqiya started becoming more assertive in public life and critical of their Zirid rulers' identification with Shia Islam, and once Al-Mu'izz ibn Badis became ruler, Sunni riots began in October 1016, starting from Kairouan and later spreading throughout Ifriqiya. About 20,000 Isma'ili Shi'ites are said to have been massacred by Malikite rioters, with the connivance of the government. Malikism was further spread in the central Maghreb during the reign of the Almoravids and Almohads who favored promoting this school of Islamic jurisprudence. They promoted the role of Maliki ulamas in several cities and towns such as Tlemcen, Mazouna, Béjaïa and Constantine.

Banu Hilal and Banu Sulaym, both Isma'ili Shia Bedouin Arab tribes, were dispatched by the Fatimids to the Maghreb to punish the Zirids for having abandoned Isma'ili Shi'ism in favor of Maliki Sunnism, resulting in about 1,000,000 Arab nomads relocating to the region. While several other factors contributed to the migration of these Arab tribes to the Maghreb, including a prolonged seven-year drought in Egypt, the Bedouin invasions of the Maghreb in the 11th century were primarily justified on religious grounds. As a result of shifting alliances, serving a significant role during the rule of the Almoravids, Hafsids, Zayyanids and Marinids, the vast majority of Banu Hilal and Banu Sulaym progressively adopted the Maliki school of Sunni Islam.

12th century Almoravid jurist Qadi Iyad, a Maliki who strongly opposed the Mu'tazilite doctrine, citing the work of Malik ibn Anas, wrote: "He said about someone who said that the Quran is created, "He is an unbeliever, so kill him." He said in the version of Ibn Nafi', "He should be flogged and painfully beaten and imprisoned until he repents." In the version of Bishr ibn Bakr at-Tinnisi we find, "He is killed and his repentance is not accepted"."

== See also ==
- Maliki school
- Malikism in Algeria
- Malik ibn Anas
- Muslim conquest of the Maghreb
- 1016 Ismaili massacre in Ifriqiya
