= Thaaliba =

Sub-tribe of the Maqil Arabs

The Thaaliba (Arabic: الثعالبة, romanized: Thaʿāliba) were a sub-tribe of the Maqil Arabs, descended from Tha`lab ibn `Ali ibn Bakr ibn Saghir ibn Maqil. They settled the Mitidja plain in the medieval period, and came to rule Algiers and the towns around it from 1204 to 1516.

The Thaaliba first reached the Mitidja plain from the Titteri region to its south. Their leadership was in the hands of the sons of Siba` ibn Tha`lab ibn `Ali ibn Bakr ibn Saghir, who had hosted Ibn Tumart and thus secured a good position. Later on, the Merinid sultan Abu al-Hasan appointed Abu al-Hamalat ibn `A'id ibn Thabit as their leader; he died in the plague of 1347/1348. He was succeeded by Ibrahim ibn Nasr, followed by his son Salim.

In 1438 the people of Algiers assassinated their new king and placed themselves under the protection of the Thaaliba, who at that point ruled most of the Mitidja plain. The city then made Shaykh Abd al-Rahman al-Tha'alibi, a noted religious scholar, head of their city council (jama`ah). Thaaliba influence also extended to smaller towns of the region, such as Isser and Dellys. After his death in 1479, Abd al-Rahman al-Tha'alibi's tomb became an important site of popular devotion, still visited to this day.

In 1510, Spain imposed tribute payments on Algiers and fortified the island in its harbour, the Peñon. To expel the Spanish troops, the Thaaliba leader Salim al-Thumi and the notables of Algiers invited in two Ottoman corsair brothers, Oruç Reis and Hayreddin Barbarossa. Before doing so, they decided to make their authority more secure by assassinating Salim al-Tumi in his bath in 1516. He thus became the last Thaaliba ruler of Algiers, which passed into the hands of Oruç and Hayreddin before joining the Ottoman Empire.

Several notable Islamic religious figures emerged from the Thaaliba, most famously including Abd al-Rahman al-Tha'alibi (1384-1479), but also the scholar and mystic Sidi Yahya al-Tadallisi al-Tha`alibi (d. 1461/1462), the first imam of Timbuktu's eponymous Sidi Yahya Mosque, and the later religious scholar Abu Mahdi Isa al-Tha`alibi (d. 1669/1670).

== Notable people ==
- Abd al-Rahman al-Tha'alibi
- Salim at Toumi

== See also ==
- Emirate of Algiers (Emirate of Thâaliba)
