= Zawiya Thaalibia (Issers) =

Building in Algeria

- الزاوية الثعالبية
- Other names: زاوية سيدي عبد الرحمن الثعالبي
- Former names: زاوية يسر
- Type: Zawiya
- Established: 1994 CE / 1415 AH
- Founders: Mohamed Nour
- Affiliations: Ministry of Religious Affairs and Endowments
- Religious affiliation: Rahmaniyya
- Location: Issers, Kabylia, Boumerdès Province, 35008, Algeria; 36.7260479°N 3.6668388°E
- Language: Arabic, Berber
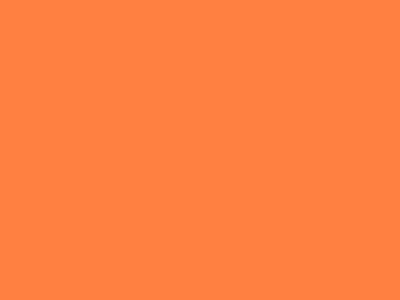

The Zawiya Thaalibia (Arabic: الزاوية الثعالبية) or the Sidi Abd al-Rahman al-Tha'alibi Zawiya (Arabic: زاوية سيدي عبد الرحمان الثعالبي) is a zawiya in the commune of the Issers in Algeria. The name "Thaalibia" relates to Abd al-Rahman al-Tha'alibi.

== Missions ==
The zawiya of Sidi Abd al-Rahman al-Tha'alabi in the Issers is considered a prominent religious teacher in memorizing and indoctrinating the Quran and its basic rulings for young people and providing the various mosques of Boumerdes Province during the month of Ramadan every year with a preservation that leads to Tarawih prayers by reciting the Quran with the Warsh recitation.

This zawiya, which opened its doors in 1994, has an important place in its fields of formation, as it has annually graduated about 70 male and female Hafiz of the Quran with its rulings and the Hadith that he depends on in framing the various mosques of the province.

It is a place to study and teach the Quran, as well as providing aid to the needy and those about to get married and organizing circumcision ceremonies.

It is one of the Zawiyas in Algeria that plays an important role in social life in the Issers region, and it is considered a modernized corner, as it is based on the traditional and modern way of teaching the Qur'an and Sunnah as well. And that the learner intends to write the verses by himself using the traditional ink, which is a special ink that the learner makes from sheep's wool, where he melts it on fire until it becomes black, then mixes it with water, and the characteristic of this ink is that it does not disappear from the written tablet except by rubbing it with clay and water.

== Headquarters ==
In the year 2000, the zawiya benefited from a new headquarters that befits its position as a scientific edifice and attracts the attention of various visitors to the city of Issers due to its enormity and its good location in the city center adjacent to the Grand Mosque.

== Students ==
There are about 160 talibes (students) who are currently studying at this zawiya coming from different regions of the Algeria.

The affiliates of this open corner for male and female students between the ages of 8 and 25 years benefit from the internal and external system.

There are 12 groups of Qur'an students in Al-Zawiya, and each group includes 80 students who come from different regions of the country, whose ages range from 8 to 25 years.

Each student must preserve the sixty parties for a period of up to two years or more, and since 2001, 263 students have graduated, and some of them joined the Islamic institutes in Hijaz, Syria, Mauritania and Yemen to complete the study of Sharia, or to practice the imamate, and some of them lead worshipers in mosques here In the homeland.

Among the students of the zawiya are those who lead the worshipers in the Tarawih prayer, and this is the true test of the lessons of recitation, intonation and memorization of the Qur'an. This is done in the provinces of Tizi Ouzou, Bouira, Boumerdès and Algiers.

The student's day begins at the zawiya after the Fajr prayer, which is the period of memorization of the panels, where each student memorizes the painting he wrote and recites the verses or provides them, depending on the techniques and judgments he learned.

== Means ==
The zawiya obtained by this educational edifice from the state Algerian budget, as well as with the aid of the benefactors, has allowed the modernization of the various wings that this edifice includes, re-equipping them with the latest educational means, such as electronic media, and improving the various daily services it provides to male and female students.

== Diplomas ==
Talibes are integrated after obtaining an Idjaza (certificate of proof of level) according to the specializations followed in the religious affairs sector, such as Imams of mosques, teachers of the Noble Quran, and Murshidates, while other students continue to study by correspondence to prove the level.

== Celebrations ==
The most important annual activities that the zawiya administration ensures to establish regularly and at a fixed date annually on the occasion of commemorating the Mawlid, on the academic and scientific day around Abd al-Rahman al-Tha'alibi, during which graduates from zawiya are honored and graduation certificates distributed to them.

This is because the zawiya is a place to establish the remembrance and memorize the Quran, and it is similar to a boarding school for teaching the Book of Allah.

== See also ==
- Ministry of Religious Affairs and Endowments
- Algerian Islamic reference
- Zawiyas in Algeria
