= Malikism in Algeria =

Malikism is considered as an essential part of the Fiqh jurisprudence practice within the Islam in Algeria. Algeria has adopted Malikism because the principles of this jurisprudential rite are rules which take into account the changes observed within the Muslim Algerian society for centuries. Understanding the rules of this Sunni Madhhab makes it possible to certify that they continuously respond to the constantly changing challenges of the daily life of the Algerian people. The rite of Imam Malik Ibn Anas has thus been adopted in Algeria and by the countries of the Maghreb and North Africa by large sections of the Muslim populations for centuries thanks to its objectivity and its recognized and certified references, following the Malikization of the Maghreb. It is generally agreed that the Malikite School worked to fight against the proliferation of sects and new trends resulting from fallacious and hazardous interpretations and tafsir of the precepts of the Quran.

== History ==
The Sunni Madhhab of Malikism spread in the land of the Central Maghreb, the current territory of Algeria, during the reign of the Almoravids and Almohads who favored the highlighting of this school of Islamic jurisprudence, founded by Malik ibn Anas, and the blossoming of the role of the ulemas of this dogmatic rite in several cities and medieval towns such as Tlemcen, Mazouna, Béjaïa and Constantine, and which have contributed to the construction and edification of the Malikism within the framework of the Algerian Islamic reference.

This is how the history of this school of fiqh shows that its development on Algerian soil took place thanks to scholarly scholars whose scientific and mystical fame went beyond the borders of the Central Maghreb.

The efforts of these fouqaha made the mosques of medieval towns shine through a rigorous and persevering teaching of the precepts of the Maliki fiqh based on the book Muwatta Imam Malik.

For more than ten centuries, this native school of Medina has contributed to the preservation of the identity of Algerian people thanks to shouyoukh and learned scholars, and who have given birth to a vigorous teaching of fiqh, and have produced works on the Maliki religious reference while preserving the Algerian national identity.

The Zayyanid dynasty saw flourish the activity of the scientific elite of Maliki jurists who crisscrossed the country from Béjaïa to Tlemcen and beyond to spread the glimmers of knowledge and drink from the Ijtihad of emblematic figures of Maghrebian Malikism so famous in the Muslim world and in later generations.

== Conferences ==
The strengthening of the Maliki tradition in Algerian society is implemented by the organization of several thematic conferences in many universities, cities, zawiyas and mosques where many delegations of scholars and specialists come to enrich the debates by their speeches.

Other fouqaha and professors of Muslim law come from other Muslim countries to focus on the platform on different aspects of Malikism across the Maghreb, Africa and the Arab world.

Various themes mix the subjects of fatwa among the Maliki community, the practice of jurisprudential dogma across the different regions of Algeria, the treatise the dogma and the practice of Malikism according to theologians like Ibn Rushd, as well as the various subjects like Islamic law, Islamic inheritance, Takaful, Islamic justice, among other themes.

== Globalization ==
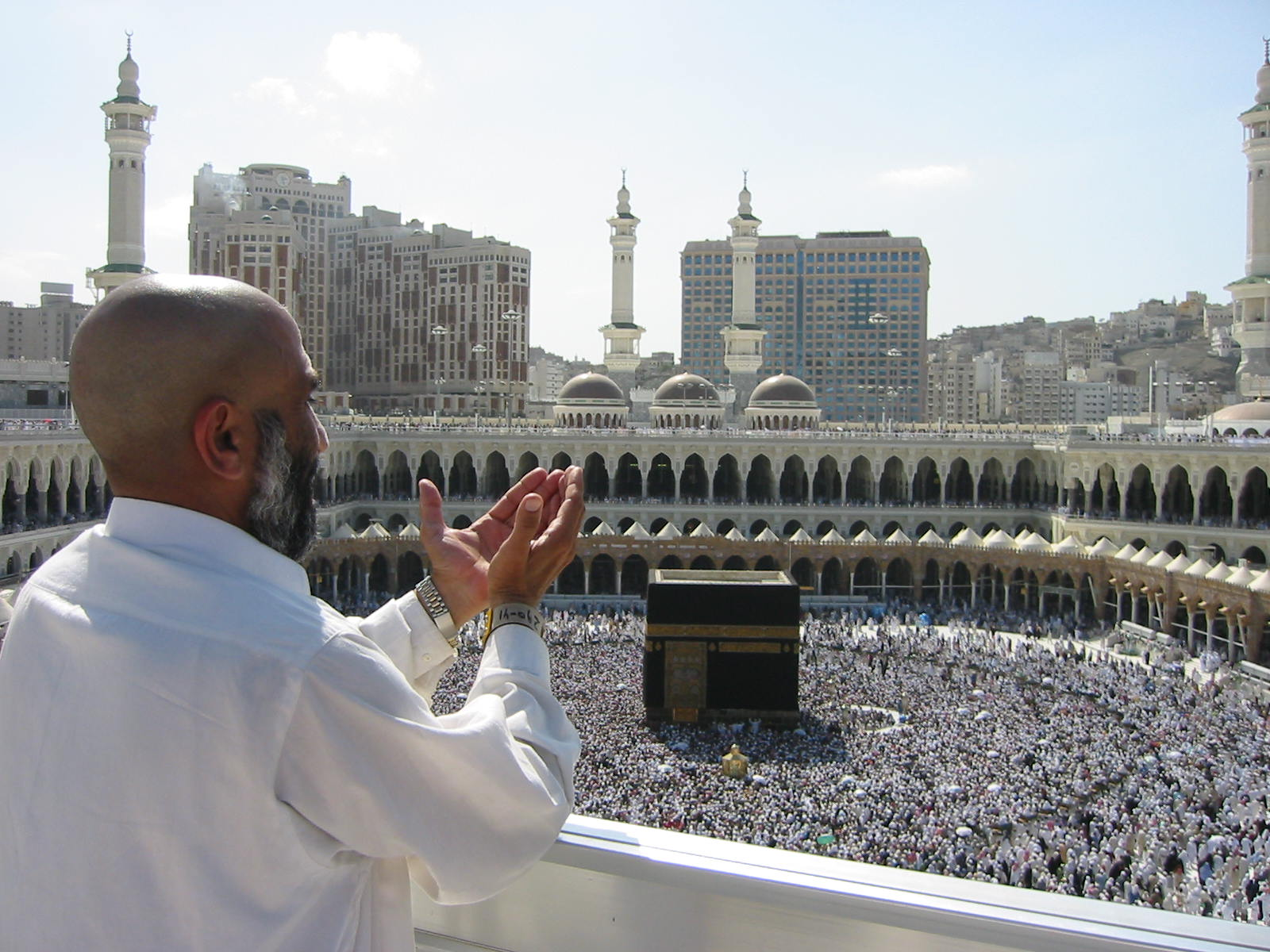
Raising hands in Dua

Media globalization has allowed the Salafist nebula to campaign energetically to remove the border, territorial and dogmatic benchmarks of Muslim nations, including Algeria.

It is thus that the bursting of national and religious borders has induced a cracking of the dominant Maliki dogma by making convey the concept of Non-Madhhabism under the eyes of theologians and Algerian officials.

With the appearance of ritual practices foreign to Maliki Islam, the Ministry of Religious Affairs and Endowments in Algeria has taken measures to protect Algerian society against division and fitna.

The dogma and the Maliki Madhhab has been formalized by texts in the Algerian constitution decreeing it to be an integral part of the Algerian Islamic reference.

Indeed, Algerian people have made fundamental choices for more than twelve centuries as to how to practice religion of Islam, and they chose the rite of Malik Ibn Anas because they rightly believed that this rite reconciles revelation (Wahy) and reason (Aql), as they also chose Sufism as a source of spirituality.

== Training ==
Considerable efforts are made to perfect the Imams in order to supervise Muslim worship in mosques according to the Maliki rite.

Periodic retraining is undertaken to instill in the Khatibs the precepts of Maliki dogma, and efforts are also made by the inspectors of the supervisory ministry, who are responsible for ensuring good religious practice and the submission of the muezzins to the guidelines that emanate from the scientific collective which sits at the level of the Algerian religious supervision.

== List of Notable Algerian Maliki Faqeeh ==
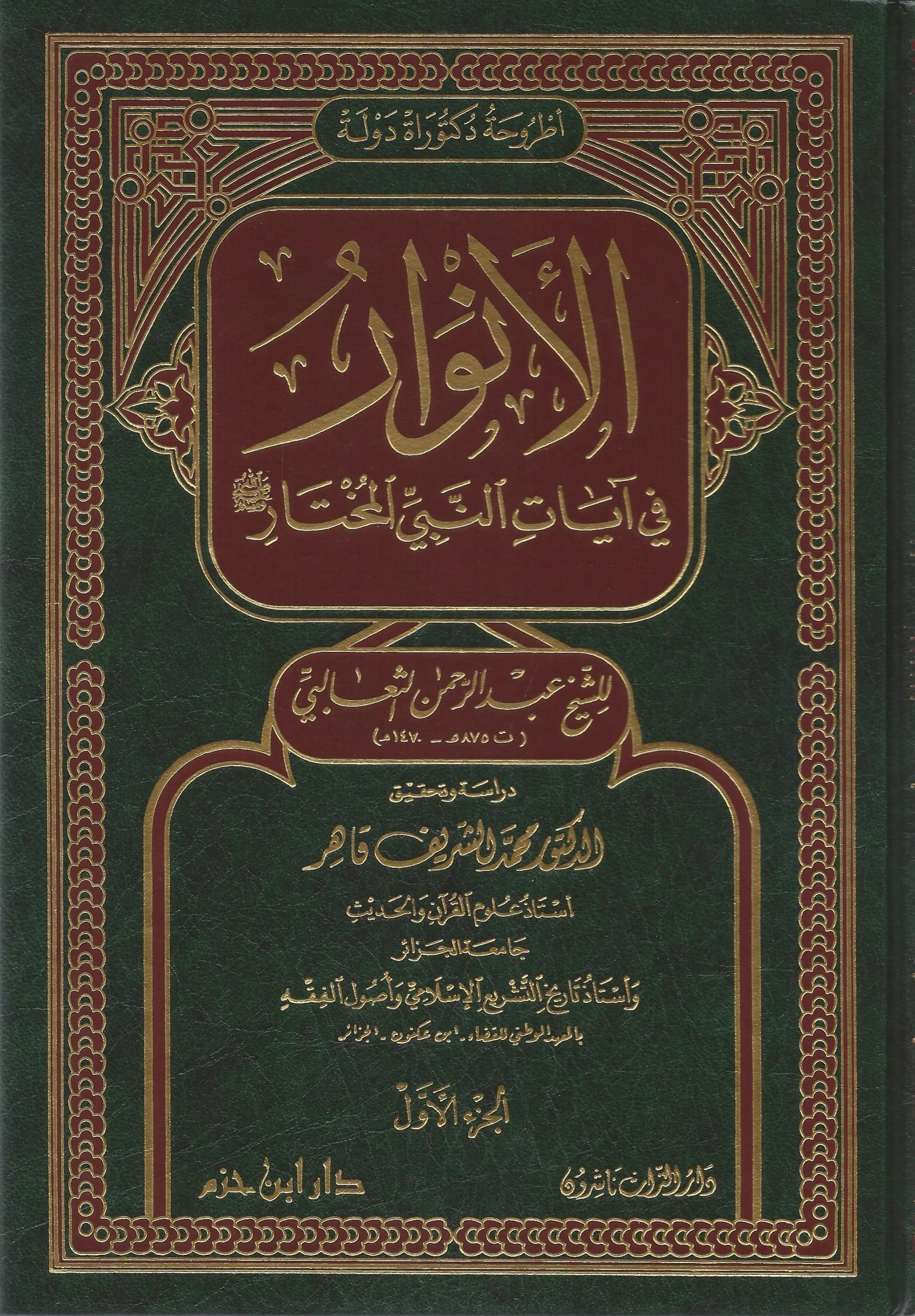
Book of Sidi Abd al-Rahman al-Tha'alibi

Algeria is a birthplace of many Maliki Faqeeh such as:

1. Sidi Abu Madyan (died 1198)
2. Mohamed al-Waghlissi (died 1241)
3. Ahmed al-Ghobrini (died 1304)
4. Mansour al-Mechedelli (died 1331)
5. Mohamed al-Melikechi (died 1339)
6. Ahmed al-Ilouli (died 1359)
7. Abderrahmane al-Waghlissi (died 1384)
8. Ali al-Menguellati (died 1412)
9. Sidi El Houari (died 1439)
10. Mansour al-Menguellati (died 1442)
11. Sidi Boushaki (died 1453)
12. Sidi Abd al-Rahman al-Tha'alibi (died 1479)
13. Sidi Ahmed Zouaoui (died 1488)
14. Sidi M'hamed Bou Qobrine (died 1793)

== Gallery ==
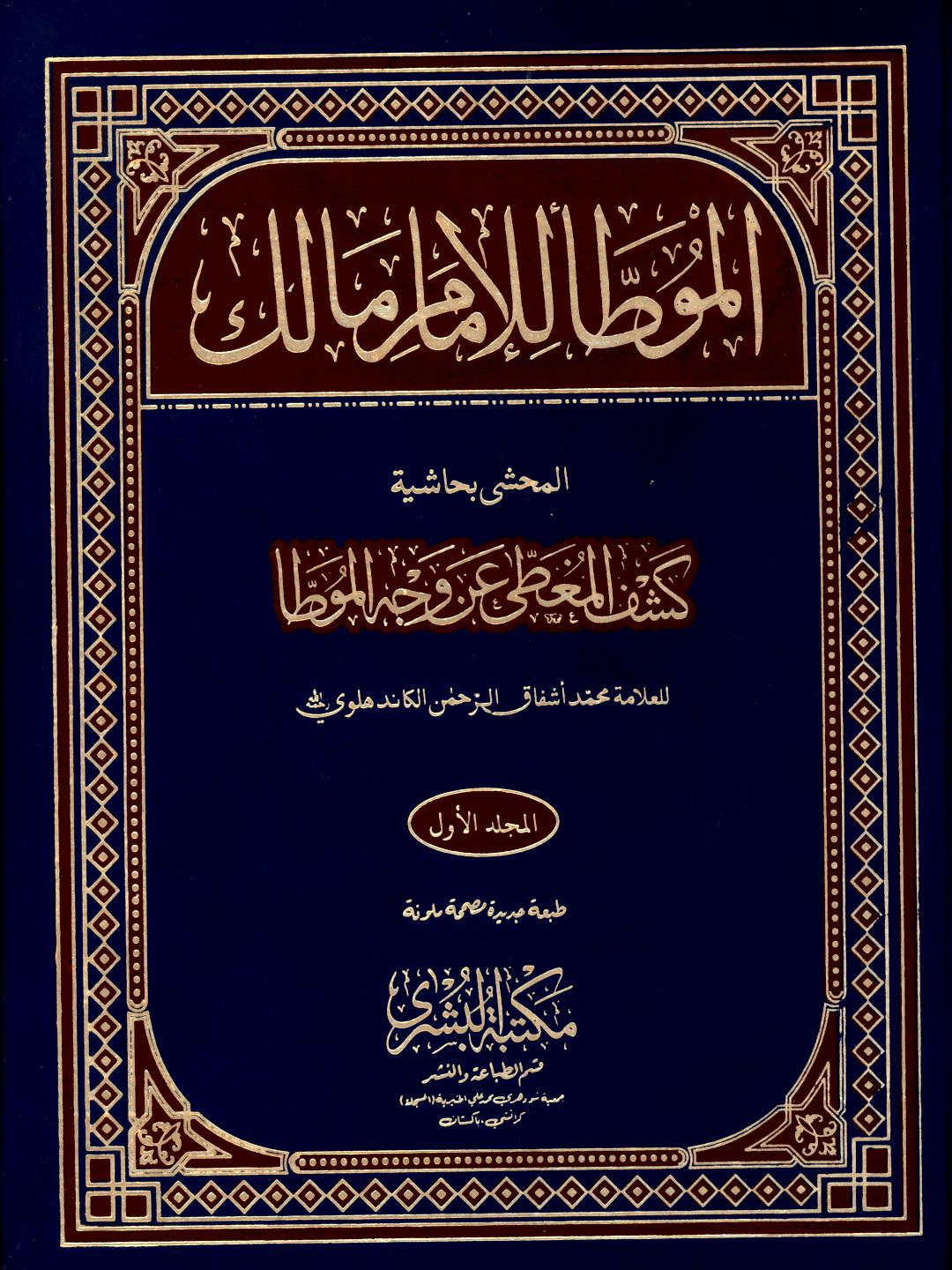
Muwatta Imam Malik

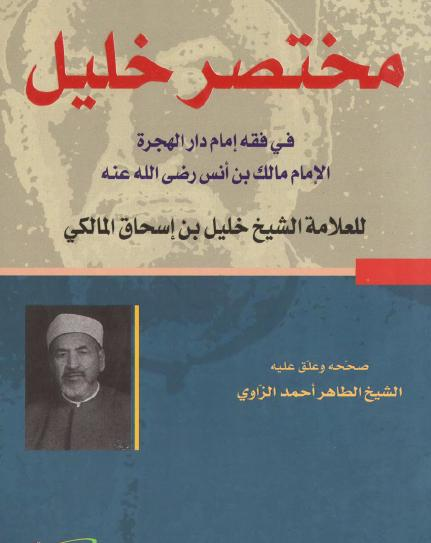
Mukhtasar Khalil

== See also ==
- Malikization of the Maghreb
- Ministry of Religious Affairs and Endowments in Algeria
- Algerian Islamic reference
- Religion in Algeria
- Non-Madhhabism
