= List of Muslim saints of Algeria =

The following is a list of Muslim saints of Algeria. The list includes all Muslim saints with Algerian connections, either because they were of Algerian origin and ethnicity, or because they travelled to Algeria from their own homeland and became noted in their hagiography for their work in Algeria and amongst the Algerian people. A small number may have had no Algerian connection in their lifetime, but have nonetheless become associated with Algeria through the depositing of their relics in Algerian religious houses.

== List of saints ==
=== A ===
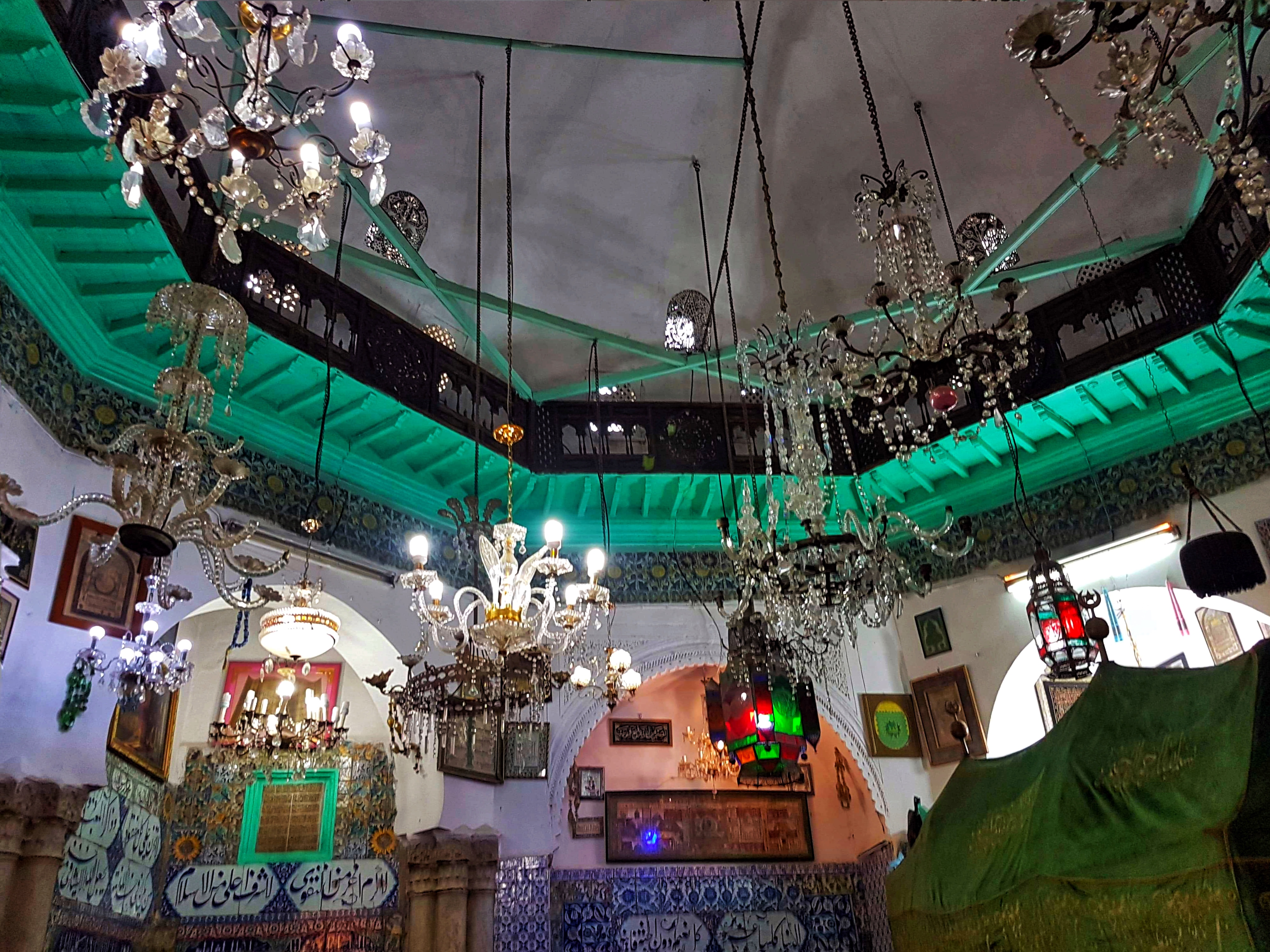
Mausoleum of Sidi Abd al-Rahman al-Tha'alibi

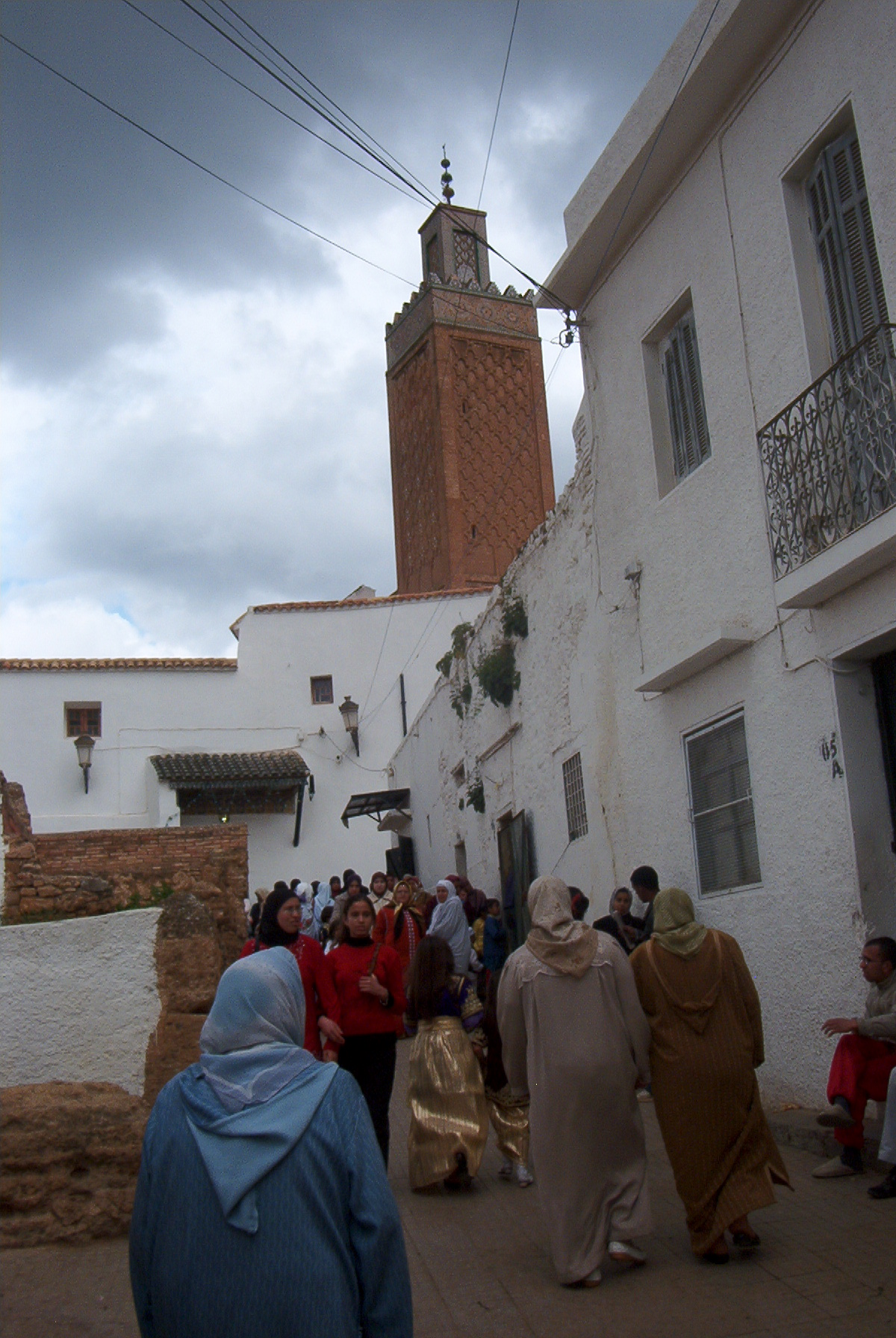
Mausoleum of Sidi Abu Madyan

- Sidi Abd al-Rahman al-Tha'alibi
- Sidi Abd Youssef
- Sidi Abdallah
- Sidi Abdelaziz
- Sidi Abdeldjebar
- Sidi Abdelkader El Hammami
- Sidi Abdelli
- Sidi Abdelmalek
- Sidi Abdelmoumene
- Sidi Abed
- Sidi Abu Madyan
- Sidi Adli
- Sidi Ahmad al-Alawi
- Sidi Ahmad al-Buni
- Sidi Ahmad al-Tijani
- Sidi Ahmed Aqellal
- Sidi Ahmed Bellabès
- Sidi Ahmed ibn Idris
- Sidi Ahmed ibn Yusuf
- Sidi Ahmed Ouhaddad
- Sidi Ahmed Ouyahia
- Sidi Ahmed Taffer
- Sidi Ahmed Zouaoui
- Sidi Aïch
- Sidi Aïssa
- Sidi Akkacha
- Sidi Ali Benyoub
- Sidi Ali Bounab
- Sidi Ali Boussidi
- Sidi Ali Mellal
- Sidi Ali Moussa
- Sidi Ali Ouyahia
- Sidi Amar Cherif
- Sidi Amar Ighil El Mal
- Sidi Ameur
- Sidi Amrane
- Sidi Aoun
- Sidi Ayad

=== B ===
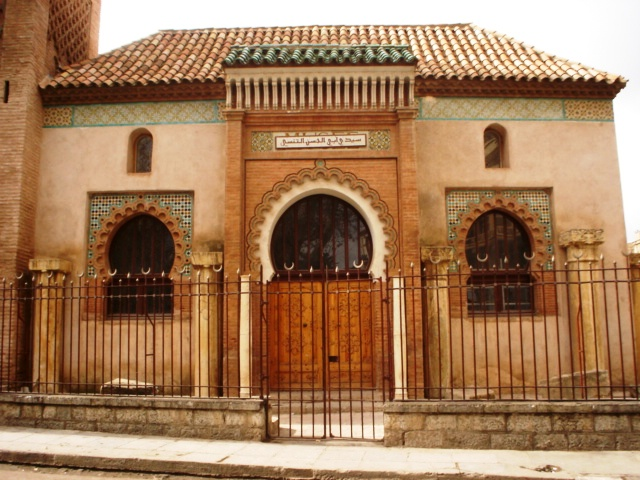
Mausoleum of Sidi Bellahcene

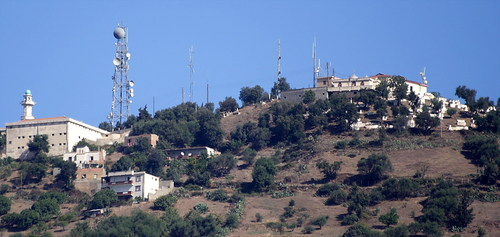
Mausoleum of Sidi Belloua

- Sidi Bahloul
- Sidi Bakhti
- Sidi Bayazid
- Sidi Bel Abbes
- Sidi Belattar
- Sidi Belahcene
- Sidi Belloua
- Sidi Ben Adda
- Sidi Bencherki
- Sidi Ben Yebka
- Sidi Benaoumer
- Sidi Betqa
- Sidi Bilel
- Sidi Boubekeur
- Sidi Boudjelili
- Sidi Boudrahem
- Sidi Boukebraïene Cherif
- Sidi Bougdour
- Sidi Bouhanifia
- Sidi Boumediene
- Sidi Boumerdassi
- Sidi Boushaki
- Sidi Boussaid
- Sidi Boutouchent
- Sidi Bouzid
- Sidi Brahim El Ghoul
- Sidi Brahim Es-Sellami

=== C ===
- Sidi Chahmi
- Sidi Cheikh
- Sidi Cherif
- Sidi Chouab

=== D ===
- Sidi Dahou Zair
- Sidi Damed
- Sidi Daoud
- Sidi Djilali

=== E ===
Mausoleuym of Sidi El Houari

- Sidi El Bachir
- Sidi El Dhehbi
- Sidi El Hasni
- Sidi El Houari
- Sidi El Mowaffaq
- Sidi El Mouhoub
- Sidi Embarek

=== F ===
- Sidi Flih
- Sidi Fredj

=== G ===
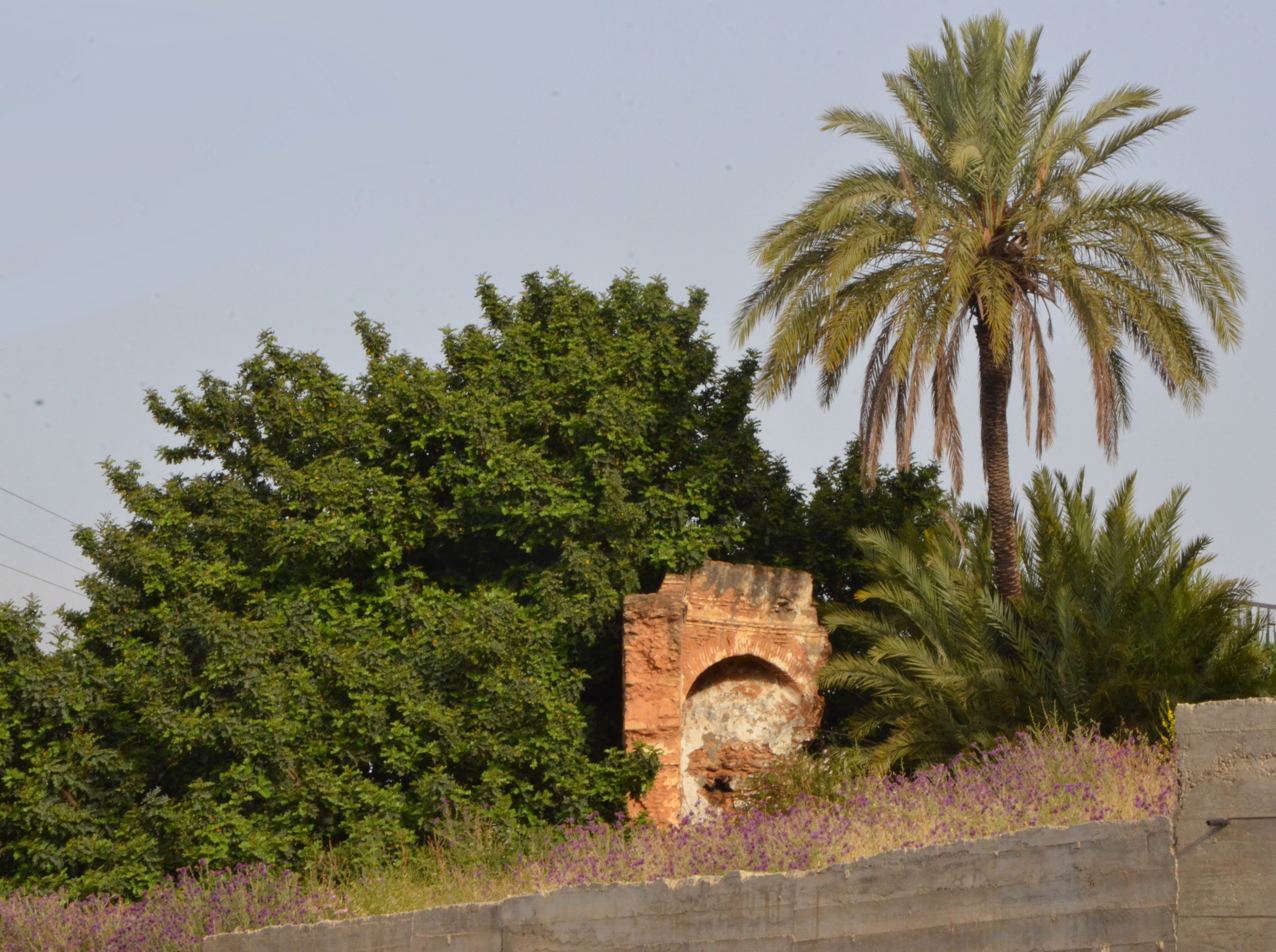
Mausoleum of Sidi Garidi.

- Sidi Garidi
- Sidi Ghanem
- Sidi Ghiles

=== H ===
- Sidi Hachelaf
- Sidi Hadjeres
- Sidi Haydour
- Sidi Hamadouche
- Sidi Hamlaoui
- Sidi Hassaïne
- Sidi Hassan
- Sidi Hellal
- Sidi Hosni

=== K ===
- Sidi Kada
- Sidi Khaled
- Sidi Khelifa
- Sidi Khelil
- Sidi Khettab
- Sidi Khouiled
- Sidi Khadir

=== L ===
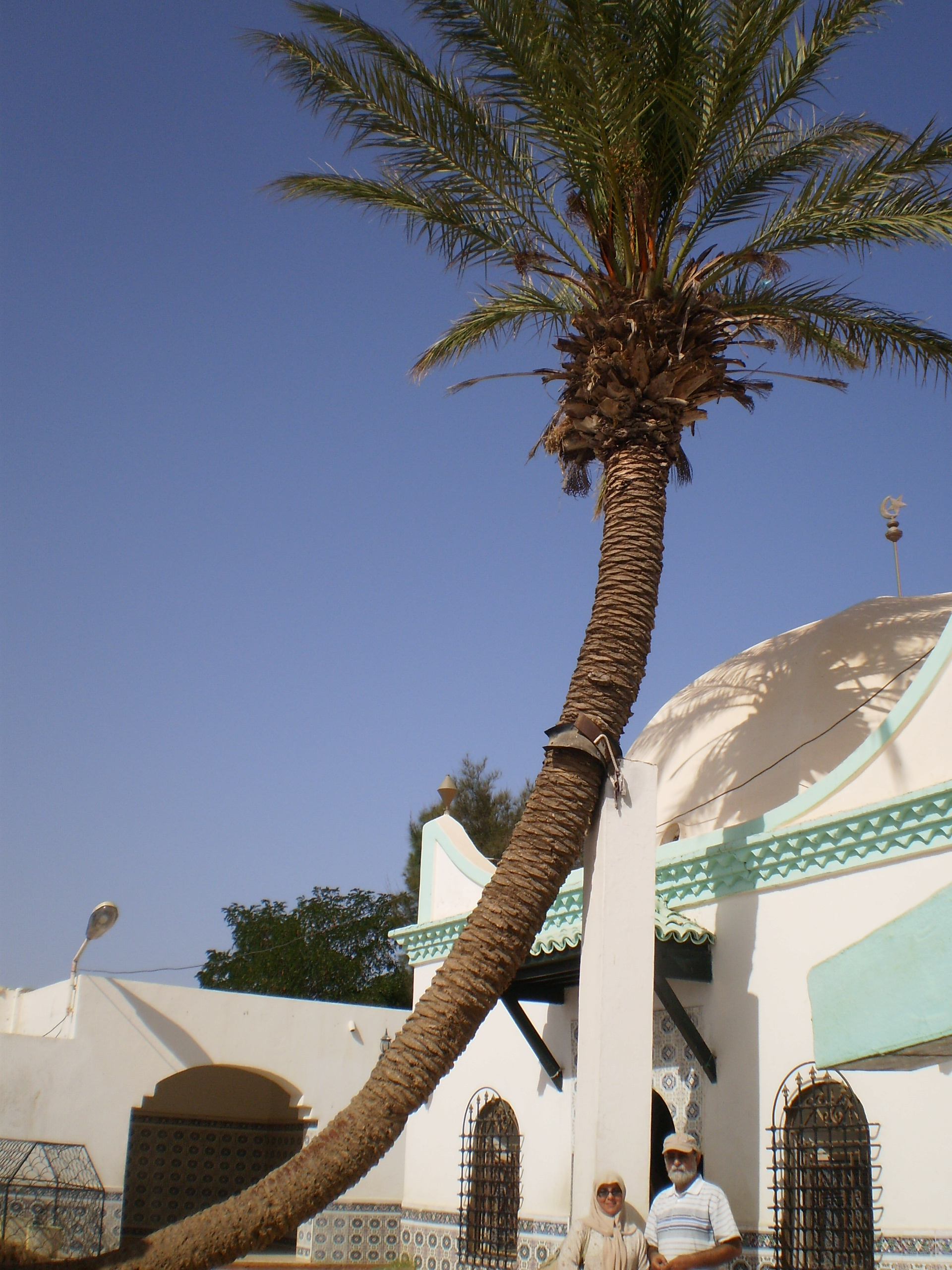
Mausoleum of Sidi Lakhdar Ben Khlouf.

- Lalla Zaynab
- Sidi Ladjel
- Sidi Lahcene
- Sidi Lahlou
- Sidi Lakhdar
- Sidi Lakhdar Ben Khlouf
- Sidi Lantri
- Sidi Lazreg
- Sidi Lebsir
- Sidi Lekhyar

=== M ===
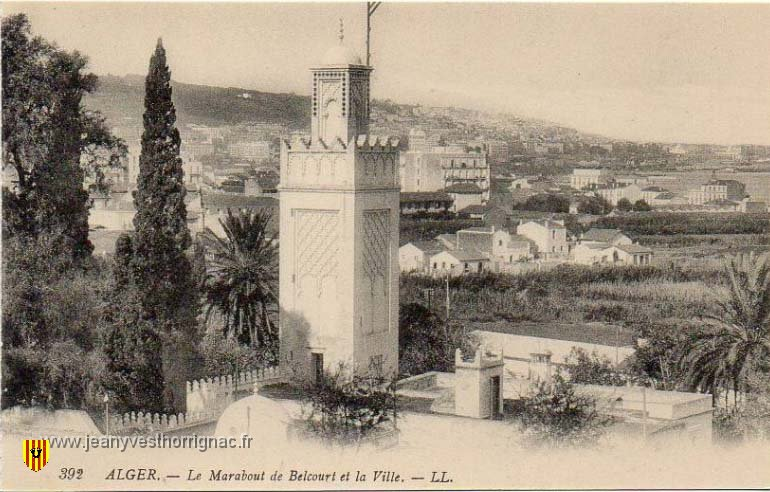
Mausoleum of Sidi M'hamed Bou Qobrine

- Sidi M'cid
- Sidi M'hamed Benali
- Sidi M'hamed Benaouda
- Sidi M'hamed Bou Qobrine
- Sidi M'hamed Ouali
- Sidi M'hamed Oussaïd
- Sidi M'hand Amokrane
- Sidi M'hand Heddad
- Sidi Makhlouf
- Sidi Mansour
- Sidi Marouf
- Sidi Medjahed
- Sidi Merabet Moussa
- Sidi Merouane
- Sidi Mezghiche
- Sidi Mihoub
- Sidi Mohamed
- Sidi Mohamed al-Khourchoufi
- Sidi Mohamed Chorfi
- Sidi Mohamed Echamekh
- Sidi Mohand Cherif
- Sidi Mohand Oulahdir
- Sidi Moughith
- Sidi Moussa
- Sidi Muhammad ibn Ali al-Sanusi

=== N ===
- Sidi Naamane
- Sidi Nadji
- Sidi Naïl

=== O ===
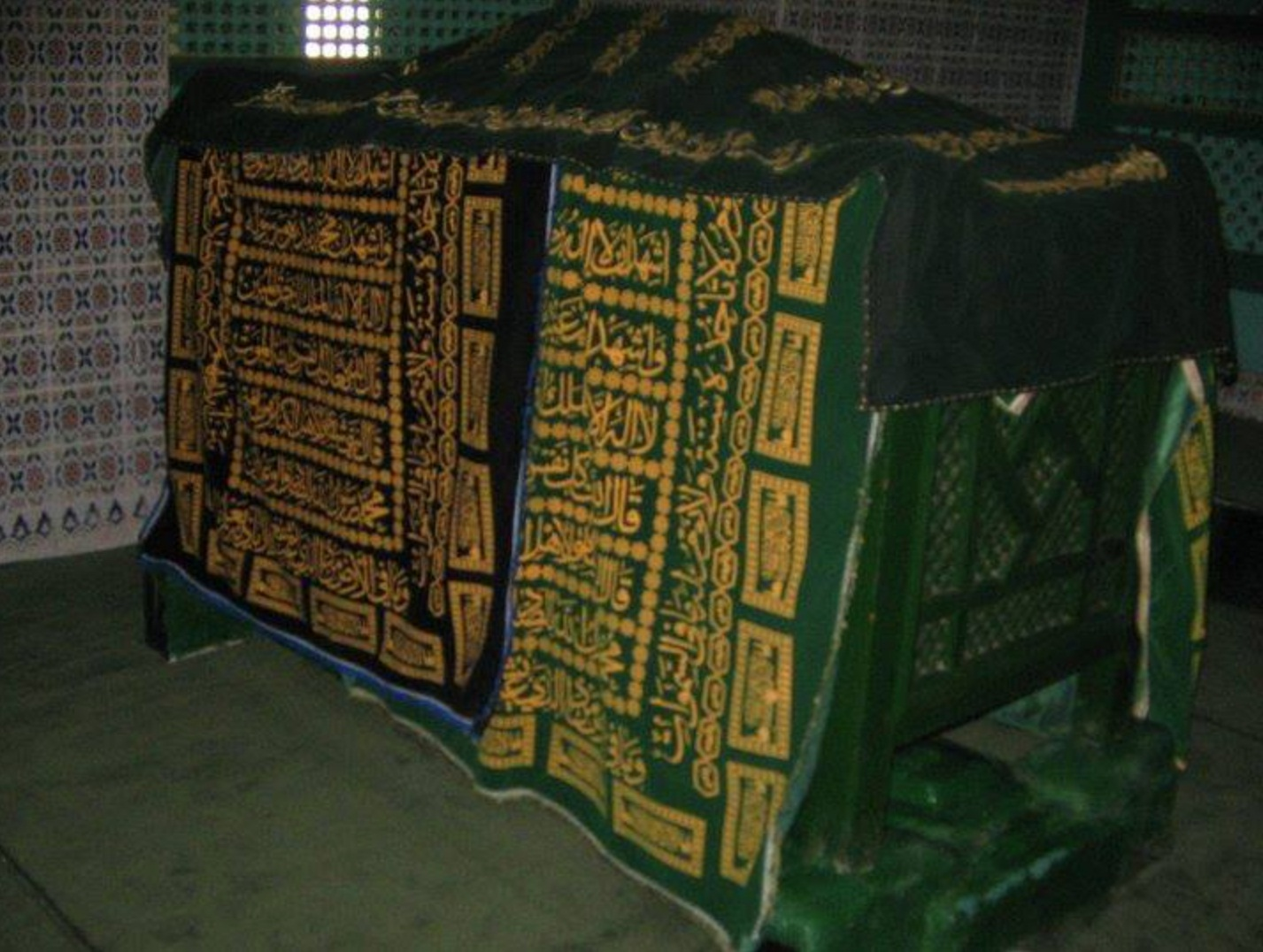
Mausoleum of Sidi Okba

- Sidi Okba
- Sidi Omar Ou El Hadj
- Sidi Ouadah
- Sidi Ouali Dada
- Sidi Ouboudaoud
- Sidi Oulhadj Amghar
- Sidi Ouriache

=== R ===
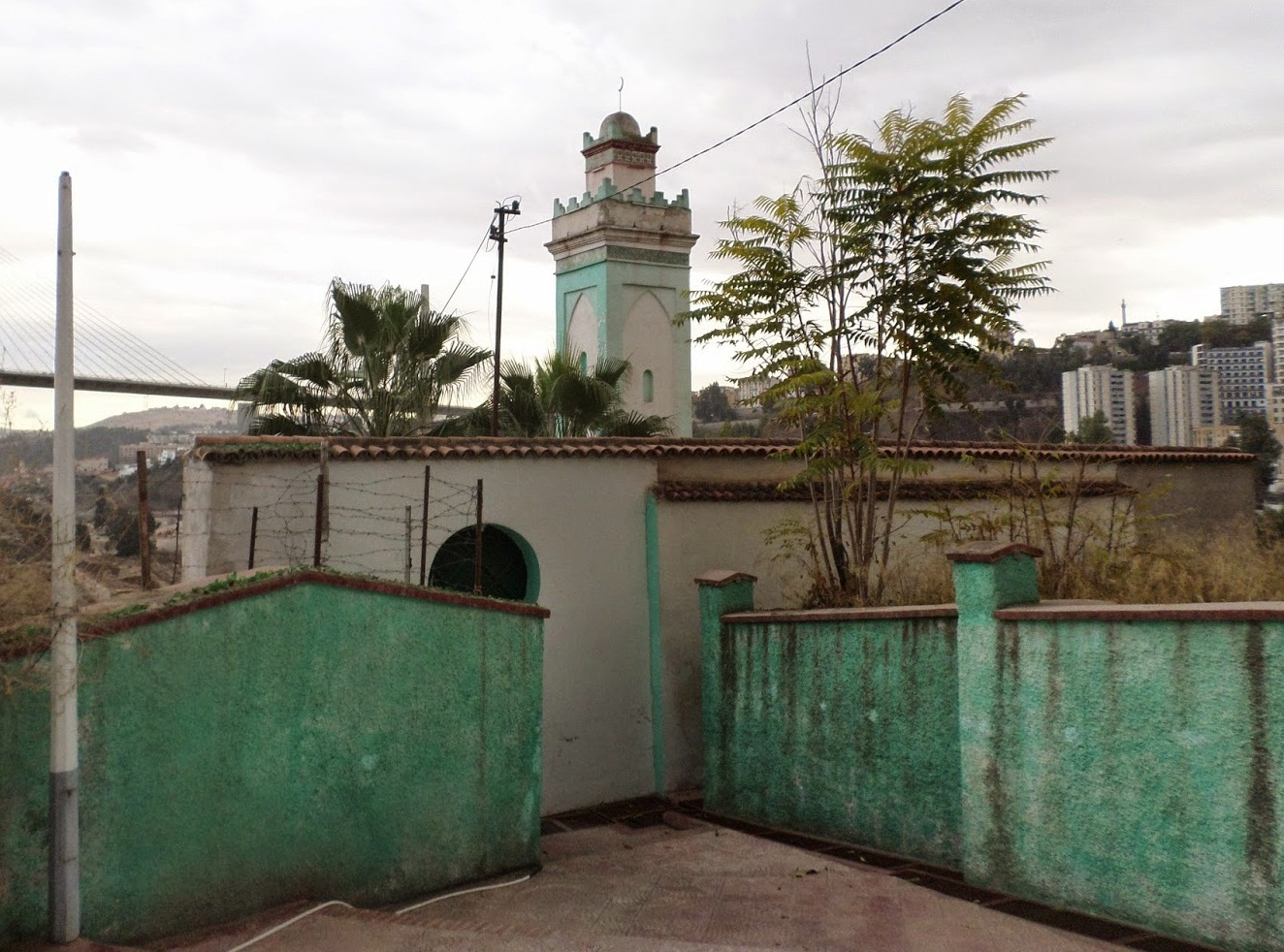
Mausoleum of Sidi Rached

- Sidi Rabai
- Sidi Rached

=== S ===
- Sidi Saad
- Sidi Saada
- Sidi Safi
- Sidi Sahnoun
- Sidi Saïd Amsisen
- Sidi Salem
- Sidi Sanusi
- Sidi Semiane
- Sidi Slimane

=== T ===
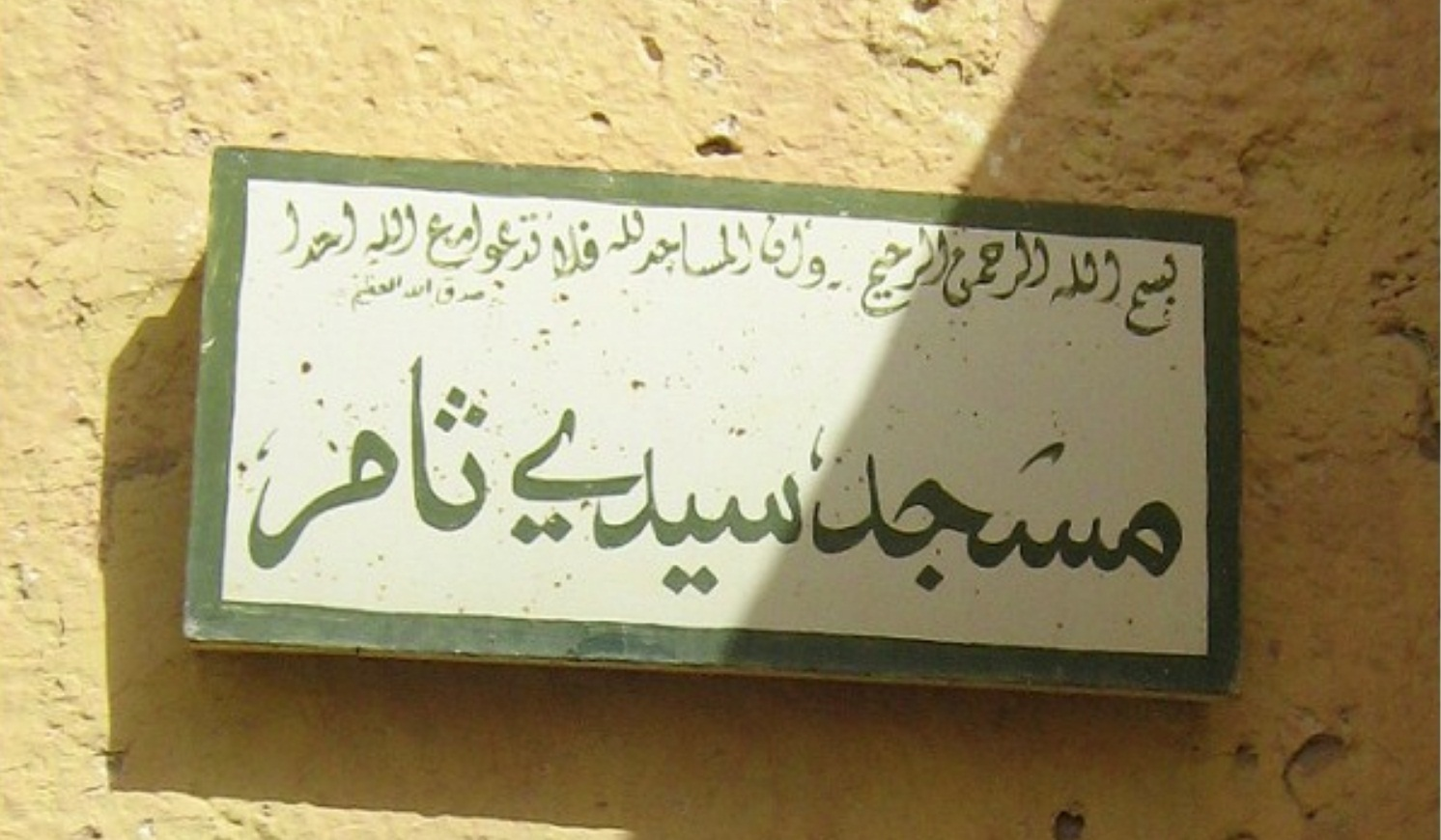
Mosque of Sidi Thamer

- Sidi Tahar
- Sidi Thamer
- Sidi Tifour
- Sidi Touati

=== U ===
- Sidi Uqba

=== Y ===
- Sidi Yacoub
- Sidi Yahia Aydali
- Sidi Yahia Boumerdassi
- Sidi Youb
- Sidi Younès
- Yemma Gouraya

=== Z ===
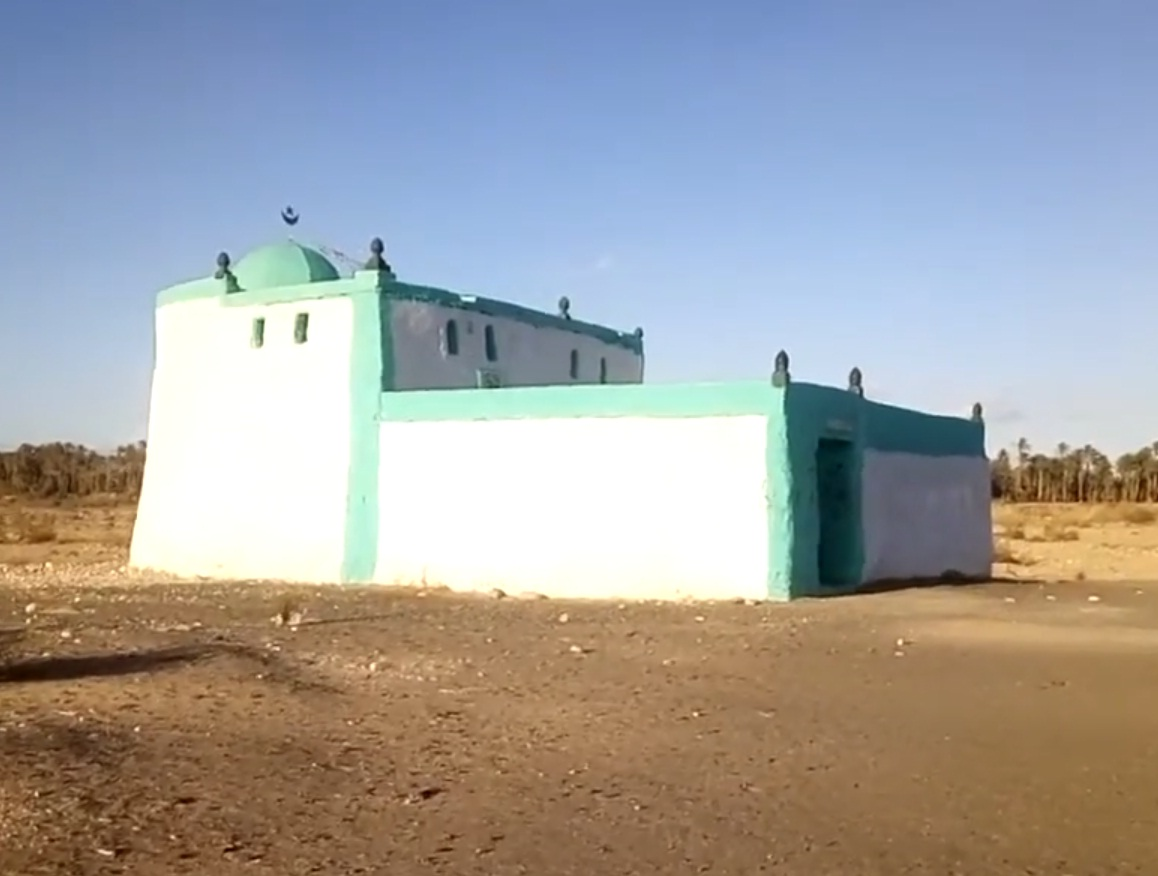
Mausoleum of Sidi Zarzour

- Sidi Zahar
- Sidi Zarzour
- Lalla Zaynab
- Sidi Ziane

== See also ==
- Algerian Islamic reference
- Islam in Algeria
- Sufism in Algeria
- Zawiyas in Algeria
- List of saints from Africa
- List of Christian saints of Algeria
