= List of Christian saints of Algeria =

This is a list of Algerian saints, blesseds, venerables, and Servants of God, as recognized by the Catholic Church. These people were born, died, or lived their religious life in the present territory of Algeria.

Catholicism had reached Algeria within the first centuries of Christianity. Though interrupted by the Muslim conquest, from ancient times, through the period of French rule, and into the present time, Algeria has had an active Catholic presence. Aside from Egypt, and possibly Tunisia, Algeria accounts for the most known saints of any individual country in Africa.

== Before the Arab Conquest ==
While Catholicism reached northern Africa during Roman times, the Roman borders did not exactly match modern ones. Some saints, particularly of Berber origin, may have been more closely associated with parts of modern Tunisia or Libya. This is a partial list of early saints certainly or probably associated with modern Algeria.

=== Popes ===
- Pope Victor I (r. 189–199)
- Pope Miltiades (r. 311–314)
- Pope Gelasius I (r. 492–496)

=== Writers and theologians ===
- Augustine of Hippo, Doctor of the Church
- Optatus, author against Donatism
- Possidius, author of a life of Augustine of Hippo

=== Others ===
- Adrian of Canterbury, of North Africa
- Alypius of Thagaste
- Arcadius of Mauretania
- Cerbonius, of North Africa
- Crispina
- Donatian and companions, of North Africa
- Fabius
- Marciana of Mauretania
- Marcellinus, Vincent, and Domninus, of North Africa
- Marianus, James, and companions
- Maximilian of Tebessa
- Monica of Hippo
- Nemesian and companions
- Typasius
- Zeno of Verona

== Modern times ==
In 1000, the privilege of naming saints was reserved to Rome. As Christianity returned to northern Africa (outside Egypt) in the latter half of the second millennium, the identities and histories of the Algerian saints has become more clear.

=== List of saints ===
- Serapion of Algiers, Mercedarian religious and martyr (canonized 1728)
- Charles de Foucauld, religious and martyr

=== List of blesseds ===
- Martyrs of Algeria, Trappists and martyrs
- Francesco Zirano, Franciscan priest and martyr

=== List of venerables ===
(There are not currently any Algerian Venerables)

=== List of Servants of God ===
- Bernardo de Monroy and two companions, Trinitarian priests and martyrs

== See also ==
- Congregation for the Causes of Saints
- List of Muslim saints of Algeria
- Catholic Church in Africa

=== Sources ===
- "Hagiography Circle"
- O'Malley, Vincent J. (2001). Saints of Africa. Our Sunday Visitor. ISBN 0-87973-373-X.
