= Bachir Abdelouahab =

Algerian Member of Municipal council and football club president

Vice-President of Sporting Club Blidéen
- In office 7 March 1925 – 1 October 1927

President of Sporting Club Blidéen
- In office 1 October 1927 – 1928

Provisional Government of the French Republic
- In office 21 October 1945 – 19 February 1946

4th President of USM Blida
- In office 1950–1953
- Preceded by: Hamid Kassoul
- Succeeded by: Mustapaha Hadji Ben Mbarek

Personal details
- Born: Bachir Ben Mohamed Abddelouahab; 2 December 1897 Miliana, Algeria
- Died: 1 July 1978 (aged 80) Blida, Algeria
- Occupation: Member of Municipal council

Bachir Ben Mohamed Abdelouahab (Arabic: بشير بن محمد عبد الوهاب, December 2, 1897, Miliana - 1978, Algiers) was an Algerian politician and medical doctor. He practiced medicine in Blida, Zaouia street since March 1924, where he was elected municipal councillor and general councillor. He was a member of the pro-French Muslim Party for Progress (PMPRO). In 1945, he was elected to the French Constituent Assembly, from the Muslim non-citizens constituency of the Algiers department. He was one three candidates on the list of the Union for Social Progress elected from Algiers.

In the Constituent Assembly he was included in the Interior, Algeria and General, Department and Municipal Administration Commission and in the Family, Population and Public Health Commission. He voted in favour of the Félix Gouin ministry formed on January 29, 1946. Aware of contradictions within the Muslim community, he resigned from the Constituent Assembly on February 19, 1946. His seat was filled by Abderahmane Fares, who had been the fourth candidate on the list of the Union for Social Progress.
