= Union and Social Progress List =

The Union for Social Progress (French: Liste d'union et de progrès social) was a list that contested the Algiers Muslim non-citizen constituency in the 1945 French Constituent Assembly election. The list was close to the French Section of the Workers' International. The candidates of the list were Bachir Abdelouahab, Mohand Achour, Abderrahmanne Bouthiba and Abderrahmane Farès.

The list won three of the four seats allotted to the constituency. It got 136,109 votes out of 235,833 votes cast (in total there were 480,826 registered voters). Abdelouahab, Achour and Bouthiba were elected. However, Abdelouahab resigned from his seat in early 1946. On March 14, 1946, Adberrahmane Farès overtook his seat in the Constituent Assembly.
