= Allaoua Amara =

Algerian historian and professor

- Born: 1975 (age 50–51); Béni Hamidan, Algeria
- Education: Emir Abdelkader University; University of Poitiers; University of Paris 1 Pantheon-Sorbonne
- Occupations: Historian, University Professor
- Employer: Emir Abdelkader University of Islamic Sciences
- Known for: Specialist in medieval Islamic and Maghrebi history
- Awards: Translation Prize of the High Commission for the Arabic Language (2014)

Allaoua Amara (in Arabic: عمارة علاوة), born in 1975 in Béni Hamidan, is an Algerian historian and university professor. A specialist in the history of the Maghreb and medieval Islam, he holds a PhD in history from the University of Paris 1 Panthéon-Sorbonne. He teaches at the Emir Abdelkader University in Constantine and collaborates with several research institutions, including the CNRPAH, CNRA in Algeria, and the CNRS in France. He has published numerous articles in international journals, as well as various books on medieval Islamic history, Algerian history, and the Algerian War, in addition to works related to translation and academic research.

== Early life ==
Amara began his studies in Béni Hamidan before entering the University of Constantine in 1991. Excelling in his class, he received a scholarship to pursue studies in France.

In 1997, he earned a Diplôme d'études approfondies (DEA) at the University of Poitiers under the supervision of Jean-Pierre Arrignon, then completed a doctorate under Françoise Micheau at Paris 1 on the topic: Power, Economy, and Society in Hammadid Maghreb, which he defended in 2002.

In 2020, he co-authored a book on Malek Bennabi with Riad Cherouana, based on over 200 archival documents—letters, press articles, and French administrative and military reports—which provided new insights into Bennabi's activities in Algeria, France, and Germany. Originally published by Dar Al-Houda in Algeria, the book was later reissued by Dar Al-Fikr in Beirut.

In 2023, Amara and Cherouana published a book on Abdeslam Ben Badis, a FLN activist who died in 1960 on the Challe line. It is based on unpublished French archival material and was released to commemorate Ben Badis's 100th birthday.

He has declined academic offers from France and Gulf countries to remain in Algeria for personal and family reasons.

== Publications ==
=== Books ===
- *Tuḥfat al-iʿtibār fīmā wuǧida min al-āṯār fī madīnat al-ǧidār*, critical edition and study of Arabic inscriptions in Tlemcen (with Fares Kaouane), Dar Al-Houda, 2021.
- *Un demi-siècle de recherches historiques dans l’université algérienne (1962–2012)*, Publications de la Faculté des lettres et civilisation islamique, 2013.
- *L’histoire de l’Algérie dans la recherche universitaire en France (1968–2008)*, Publications de la Faculté des lettres et sciences humaines, 2010.

=== Selected Articles ===
- "Islamisation and Arabisation of the Muslim West (7th–12th c.)", in *Bibliothèque historique des pays d’Islam*, Éditions de la Sorbonne, 2011.
- "Algiers: From Zirid Foundation to Regional Capital (10th–15th c.)", *Hesperis-Tamuda*, 2021.
- "Abridged Dībājat al-iftiḫār and the Saints of the Chélif Valley", *Arabica*, 2020.
- "Malfante the African: Rereading the 'Letter from Touat' (1447)", *Bulletin critique des annales islamologiques*, 2025.

== Awards ==
- 2014: Translation Prize from the Supreme Council of the Arabic language in Algeria (Presidency of the Algerian Republic)
