= Abderrahmane Farès =

Algerian politician

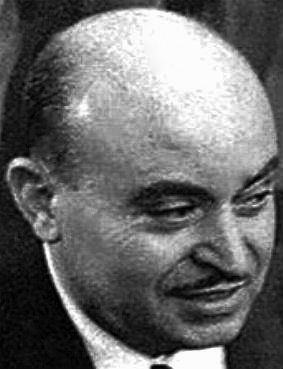

President of the Provisional Executive Council of Algeria
- In office 13 April 1962 – 20 September 1962
- Prime Minister: Benyoucef Benkhedda
- Vice President: Roger Roth
- Preceded by: Head of Provisional Government of Algeria
- Succeeded by: Ferhat Abbas

Personal details
- Born: 30 January 1911 Amalou, Béjaïa Province, Algeria
- Died: 13 May 1991 (aged 80) Zemmouri, Algeria, Algeria
- Party: FLN

Abderrahmane Farès (Arabic: عبدالرحمن فارس; ALA-LC: ʿAbd ar-Raḥman Fāris; Kabyle: ⵄⴻⴱⴷⴻⵔⴰⵃⵎⴰⵏ ⴼⴰⵔⴻⵙ, 'Ɛebderaḥman Fares; 30 January 1911 – 13 May 1991) was the Chairman of the Provisional Executive of Algeria from 13 April 1962 to 20 September 1962.

== Biography ==
Farès, who was born in Amalou, Béjaïa Province, was a lawyer by profession. After the Second World War, Farès was elected to municipal council and the general council of Algiers. In the 1945 French Constituent Assembly election, Farès was the fourth candidate of the Union and Social Progress List for the Muslim non-citizen constituency of Algiers (which had four seats in total). The list won three of the four seats. When the elected Constituent Assembly member Bachir Abdelouahab resigned, Farès overtook his seat in the Assembly on 14 March 1946. He sat in the French Section of the Workers' International (Social-Democrats) parliamentary group.

In the Constituent Assembly he was included in the Interior, Algeria and General Administration Commission.

He then took part to the Algerian Assembly election in 1948 and 1951, and became its President in 1953.

On November 4, Farès was arrested for allegedly funding the FLN. He was released from prison on 19 March 1962, the day after the signing of the Évian Accords.

Political offices
Preceded by Benyoucef Benkhedda as Head of the Provisional Government of the Algerian Republic	President of the Provisional Executive Council of Algeria; 1962	Succeeded by Ferhat Abbas as President of the National Constituent Assembly of Algeria
