= Ahmad al-Zawawi =

Theologian and Maliki Mufti of Algiers

Ahmad al-Zawawi Maliki Mufti
- Title: Maliki Mufti of Algiers

Personal life
- Born: أحمد بن عبد الله الزواوي; 1398 CE/800 AH Algiers
- Died: 1488 CE/884 AH Algiers
- Resting place: Casbah of Algiers
- Home town: Casbah of Algiers
- Parent: Abdallah Zouaoui (father)
- Region: Algeria
- Main interest(s): Sufism, Aqida, Malikism
- Notable works: Poem in the faith beliefs (Arabic: اللامية في العقائد الإيمانية) or (Arabic: كفاية المريد فى علم التوحيد) * Poem in monotheism (Arabic: القصيد في علم التوحيد)
- Other name: أبو العباس أحمد بن عبد الله الزواوي
- Posthumous name: سيدي أحمد الزواوي

Religious life
- Religion: Sunni Islam
- Order: Malikism
- School: Sunnism
- Jurisprudence: Maliki

Senior posting
- Teacher: Abd al-Rahman al-Tha'alibi
- Predecessor: Abd al-Rahman al-Tha'alibi
- Influenced by: Abd al-Rahman al-Tha'alibi
- Influenced: Ahmad Zarruq, Mohamed Sanoussi

Ahmad al-Zawawi (Arabic: أحمد بن عبد الله الزواوي Abu al-Abbas Ahmad ibn Abdallah az-Zawawi) (1398 CE/800 AH – 1488 CE/884 AH) was born in Algiers. He was a theologian and Maliki Mufti of Algiers.

== Teachers ==
Ahmad al-Zawawi had the Imam Abd al-Rahman al-Tha'alibi as a guide and teacher in Malikism and Sufism.

He was also a disciple for several scholars as Al-Sakhawi and others.

== Disciples ==
He taught several scholars as:

- Ahmad Zarruq
- Muhammad ibn Yusuf al-Sanusi

== Works ==
His works cover several aspects of the Islamic sciences, as:

- Poem in the faith beliefs (Arabic: اللامية في العقائد الإيمانية) or (Arabic: كفاية المريد فى علم التوحيد).
- Poem in monotheism (Arabic: القصيد في علم التوحيد).

== Citations ==
- Ahmad Zarruq said about his sheikh Ahmed Zouaoui:

Arabic citation	English translation
Arabic: كان شيخنا أبو العباس أحمد الجزائري من أعظم العلماء اتباعًا للسنة وأكبرهم حالًا في الورع، وكان يشير علينا بأن ينبغي لمن وسع اللَّه عليه من الدنيا أن يظهر عليه أثر نعمة اللَّه عليه باستعمالها على وجه يباح ولا يخل بالحق ولا بالحقيقة بأن يلبس أحسن لباس جنسه أو وسطه ويتخذ مرفعة إن أمكن يجعلها عدته وأصل لباسه فما دام غنيًا عنها استغنى وإلا فهو المرجع عنده. — Ahmad Zarruq	English: Our Sheikh Abu al-Abbas Ahmad al-Jazaery was one of the greatest scholars following the Sunnah and the eldest of them in piety, and he used to point out to us that whoever Allah has enabled him from the world should show the effect of Allah's blessing on him by using it in a permissible manner and does not prejudice the truth, or the truth by wearing the best clothes of his community or middle. And he takes a hoof, if possible, makes it his common and original clothing, so long as he is rich with it, he has dispensed, otherwise he is the reference for him. — Ahmad Zarruq

- Al-Sakhawi said about his disciple Ahmed Zouaoui:

Arabic citation	English translation
Arabic: (أحمد الزواوي) من المشهورين بالصلاح والعلم والورع والتحقيق. — Al-Sakhawi, Dhaw'a al-Lami'e	English: (Ahmed Zouaoui) is famous for goodness, knowledge, piety and investigation. — Al-Sakhawi, Dhaw'a al-Lami'e

== Poems ==
Ahmad al-Zawawi wrote several poem lines, such as these in sufism:

واعلم بأن عيوب النفس مهلكة ـــــ أقلها ميلها للعجز والكسل

وحالنا كلنا في النفس واحدة ـــــ لأن علتها أربت على العلل

فنسأل الله عونا فهو ملجؤنا ـــــ على نفوس قست للخير لم تمل

— Ahmed Zouaoui, in Mukhtasar Sanoussi

== See also ==
- Muftis in Algiers
- Islam in Algeria
