= Amalou, Algeria =

Amalou Amalu (Kabyle)
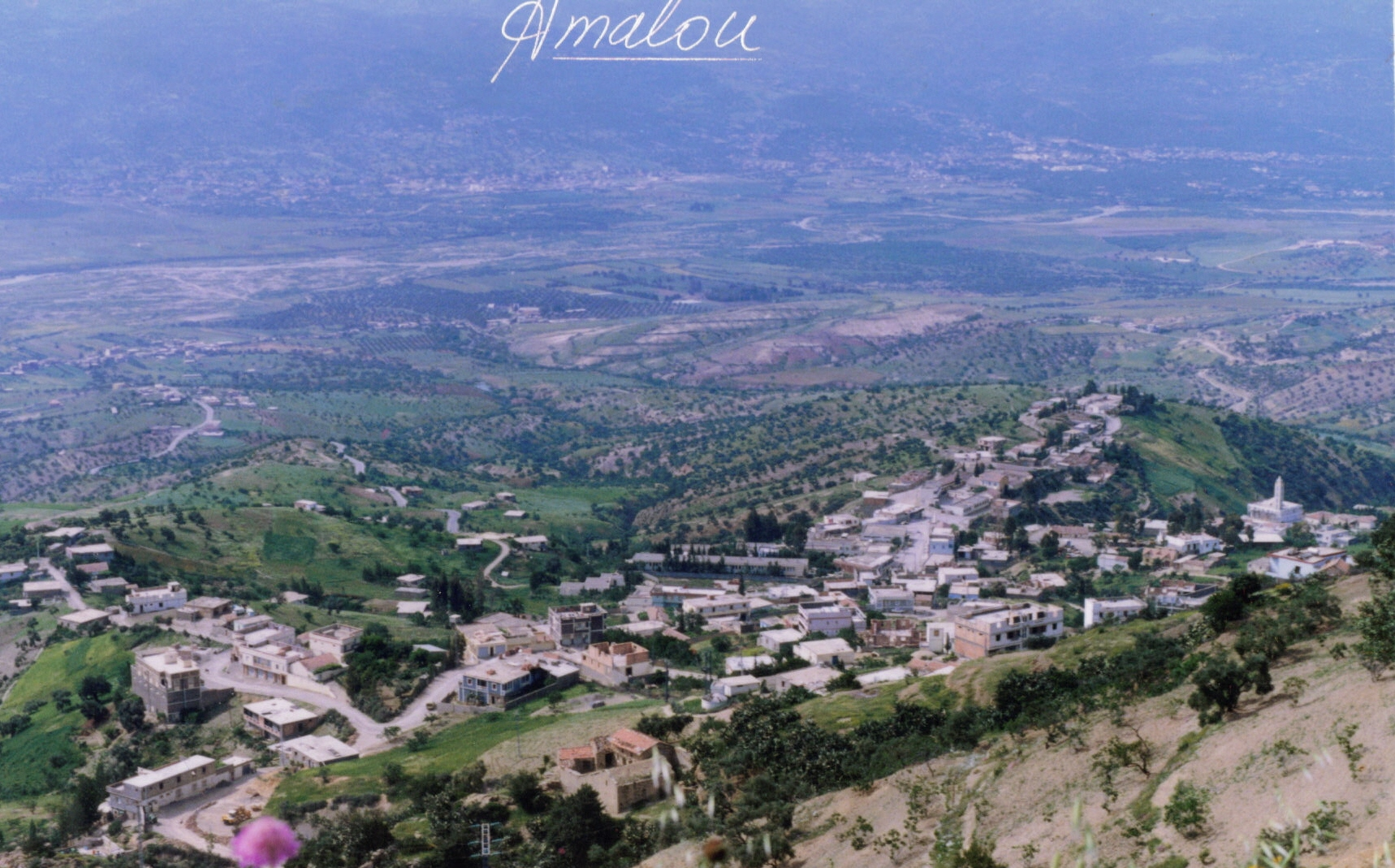

- Location within Algeria
- Coordinates: 36°28′40″N 4°38′0″E
- Country: Algeria
- Province: Bejaia
- Time zone: UTC+1 (West Africa Time)

Amalou (Kabyle: Amalu) is a commune and town in northern Algeria. It is located in the Seddouk District of Béjaïa Province, within the Kabylie region.

== Geography ==
Amalou lies in the Soummam Valley in northern Algeria, a region known for its Mediterranean climate and hilly terrain. The commune covers an area of approximately 57.14 km² and sits at an elevation of about 430–490 m above sea level.

The town is surrounded by other settlements and localities such as Akourma, Bouhamza, and Seddouk.

== Population ==
According to the 2008 census, the population of Amalou was 8,602. Historical demographic information shows some fluctuation in population over time.

== Administration ==
Amalou is administered as a commune within the Béjaïa Province (Wilaya de Béjaïa), adhering to Algeria’s standard municipal governance structure. It has its own People’s Municipal Assembly (Assemblée Populaire Communale) that manages local administrative matters.

== Villages ==
The commune of Amalou includes several smaller villages and localities, which are part of its administrative territory. Some of these include Ighil Igueni, Ath Djemhour, Thaddart Ouadda, Ighil N Tala, Akourma, Timesririne, Biziou, and Tizi Larbaa, among others.

== Toponymy ==
The name Amalou is derived from a Berber (Tamazight) root ML, which can mean “the less sunny slope” or a place that remains shaded longer, reflecting its geographical character.

== Economy and Culture ==
As part of the Kabylie region, Amalou’s economy is traditionally based on agriculture, small-scale trade, and artisanal activities typical of rural Algerian communes. The town and its surroundings also exhibit Kabyle cultural traditions, including language and social customs.
