= 2008 Issers bombing =

Terrorist incident in Algeria

Coordinates: 36.716°N 3.666°E

- Boumerdès Province highlighted within Algeria
- Location: (Algeria) Issers, Boumerdès Province
- Date: August 19, 2008
- Attack type: Suicide Bombing
- Deaths: 43
- Injuries: 38
- Perpetrator: Al-Qaeda Organization in the Islamic Maghreb (suspected)

The 2008 Issers bombing occurred on August 19, 2008, when a suicide bomber drove and detonated a vehicle laden with explosives into a crowd of para-military recruits waiting to take exams outside a police academy in Issers, Boumerdès Province, Algeria killing 43 and injuring 38. Al-Qaeda in the Islamic Maghreb was suspected as being responsible.

== International reactions ==
=== International organizations ===
- European Union - The French EU presidency condemned the bombing, releasing a statement in which the EU "very firmly condemns the terrorist acts that have just claimed so many lives", remarking that Algerian people are "once again victims of blind and barbaric terrorist violence".

=== Countries ===
- Algeria – Algerian Interior Minister Yazid Zerhouni called the bombing "an act against Algerians, these terrorist gangs are seeking through attacks against civilians to loosen the net closing around them as the security forces drive them to the wall".
- France - The French Prime Minister, François Fillon, phoned his Algerian counterpart to assure him "the support of France in the fight against terrorism".
- Italy - The Italian Prime Minister Silvio Berlusconi expressed his support for Algeria's leadership.
- Sahrawi Arab Democratic Republic - Mohamed Abdelaziz, president of the SADR, vividly condemned "the coward terrorist attacks in Issers and Bouira (Algeria), which caused the loss of innocent lives", recalling the Sahrawi government and people "unconditional solidarity with Algeria in these sad moments".
- Spain - The Spanish Foreign Minister, Miguel Ángel Moratinos, called his Algerian counterpart to express his condolences and the support of the Spanish people. "The government expresses its indignation and its firm condemnation of the cowardly terrorist attack on Wednesday against the civilian population of Bouira, which left many dead and wounded, just one day after the attack in Issers," the ministry said in a statement.

== See also ==
- Terrorist bombings in Algeria
- List of terrorist incidents, 2008
