= Supreme Council of the Arabic language =

Algerian presidential advisory body

Supreme Council of the Arabic language in Algeria
- المجلس الأعلى للغة العربية بالجزائر
- Motto: "Journal of the versions of the Council"
- Established: 1996
- President: Larabi Oueld Khalifa
- Location: Franklin Roosevelt Street POB: 575 Didouche Mourad Algiers Algeria 16 000, Algeria , Algiers
- Website: https://www.hcla.dz/

The Supreme Council of the Arabic language in Algeria (Arabic: المجلس الأعلى للغة العربية بالجزائر) is an advisory body to the President of the Republic of Algeria, established by Order No. 96/30 of December 21, 1996, as amended and supplemented to the law 91-05 of 16 January 1991.

Council which has members and chaired by working to upgrade the Arabic language in Algeria and their uses.
