= Issers =

Coordinates: 36.716°N 3.666°E

Isser
- Commune and town
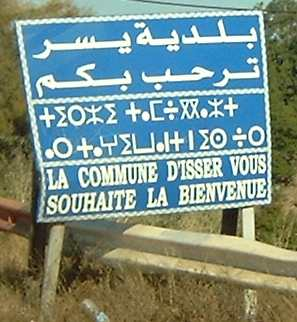
- Trilingual welcome sign in Isser written in Arabic, Kabyle (Tifinagh script), and French. ("The municipality of Isser welcomes you.")
- Interactive map of Isser
- Country: Algeria
- Province: Boumerdès Province

Population (1998)
  - Total: 27,990
- Time zone: UTC+1 (CET)

Isser, formerly spelled Issers (Arabic: يسر, Kabyle: ⵉⵙⴻⵔ) is a town and commune in Boumerdès Province, Algeria. According to the 1998 census it has a population of 27,990. As of the latest census it has 32,580 residents.

Isser is located on the south bank of the Isser River and near the centre of the Isser coastal plain, which stretches from Thenia to Naciria.

== History ==
=== French conquest ===
- First Battle of the Issers (1837)

=== Salafist terrorism ===
- 2008 Issers bombing (19 August 2008)

== Transport ==
The road RN 12 runs through Isser, linking it with Si-Mustapha to the west and Bordj Menaïel to the east. The smaller RN 68 links it to Djinet in the north and Chabet el Ameur in the south.

== Zawiya ==
- Zawiya Thaalibia

== Notable people ==
- Sidi Abder Rahman El Thaelebi, Algerian Islamic scholar
- Messaoud Aït Abderrahmane, Algerian footballer
- Raïs Hamidou, Algerian privateer
