= Abdul-Rahman al-Tha'alibi =

Algerian Sufi saint

Abd al-Raḥmān ibn Makhlūf ath-Tha‘ālibī عبد الرحمن بن مخلوف الثعالبي

Personal life
- Born: 1384 CE/785 AH Isser
- Died: 15 March 1479 / Friday, 23rd of Ramadan 875 AH Algiers
- Resting place: Thaalibia Cemetery, Bab El Oued
- Region: Algeria
- Main interest(s): kalam, Sufism, Aqida, Tafsir, Hadith, Fiqh
- Notable work(s): Al Jawahir Al Hissane fi Tafsir Al Koran (the fine pearls in the exegesis of the Koran) and Haqaiq at-Tawhid (Realities of Oneness)

Religious life
- Religion: Islam
- Denomination: Sunni
- Jurisprudence: Maliki
- Creed: Ash'ari

Muslim leader
- Influenced by: Malik Ibn Anas Abu Hasan al-Ash'ari Al-Ghazali
- Influenced: Muhammad ibn Yusuf al-Sanusi Ahmed Zouaoui

Abdul-Rahman al-Tha'alibi (Arabic: أبو زيد عـبـد الـرحـمـن بن مـخـلـوف الـثـعـالـبـي, romanized: Abū Zayd ‘Abd al-Raḥmān ibn Makhlūf ath-Tha‘ālibī) (1384 CE/785 AH – 15 March 1479 CE/875 AH) was an Algerian Islamic scholar, Imam and Sufi wali. Born near the town of Isser (86 km south east of Algiers), he was raised in a very spiritual environment with high Islamic values and ethics. He had great interpersonal skills and devoted his entire life in service of the most deprived, to dhikr of Allah, and to writing of over 100 books and treatises.

He has become a symbol of Algiers, which has become known as the "city of sidi Abder Rahman."

== Birth and Lineage ==
Abdul-Rahman al-Tha'alibi was born in the year 1384 CE/785 AH in Isser in modern-day Boumerdès Province into a pious family with a lineage going back to Ja'far ibn Abi Talib. His Arab Maqillian Bedouin tribe, the Tha'aliba, had long dominated several regions of Algeria from 1204 CE to 1515 CE. In 1378 CE, their nomadic dominance had been broken up by Abu Hammu II, the Sultan of the Kingdom of Tlemcen.

His full lineage is Abu Zaid Abdul Rahman bin Muhammad bin Makhlouf bin Talha bin Amer bin Noufal bin Amer bin Mussour bin Muhammad bin Saba'a bin Makki bin Thalabah bin Musa bin Saeed bin Mufaddal bin Abdul Bar bin Fisi bin Hilal bin Amer bin Hassan bin Muhammad bin Ja'far ibn Abi Talib.

== Biography ==
When 15 years old, Abdul-Rahman, with his father Mohamed Ben Makhlouf, went to Morocco for studies where he met the Muslim scholar Mohamed Ibn Marzoug Al Adrissi.

In 1392, he made another trip to Bejaia (200 km east of Algiers) seeking knowledge where his father died. He stayed in Bejaia for 7 years studying Islamic sciences. There he learned from disciples of Abdurrahman El-Waghlissi (d. 1383 CE), such as Abû al-Husayn al-Mangalâtî.

Then 24 years old, he travelled to Tunis in 1406 where he stayed for eight years. He met the sheikhs Mohammed Ibn Khalf al-Ubay and Abû al-Mahdi al-Ghabrînî (d. 1413 CE) who introduced him to Sufism and tafsir.Then traveled to Cairo in 1414 where he stayed with Walî Eddîn al-'Irâqî (d. 1422 CE). Then he traveled to Bursa in Turkey. He returned to Tunisia.From Tunisia at the age of 32, Abdul-Rahman went to perform Hajj to Mecca, then returned to his native Algiers.

He taught in the Djamaa el Kebir mosque until he died on the Friday of 23rd of Ramadan 875 AH, the 15th of March 1479 and was buried in Thaalibia Cemetery next to his sheikh Abi Djamaa Al Maknassi in the Casbah of Algiers.

== Disciples ==
Abdul-Rahman taught several murids and tolbas in Algiers, as:

1. Muhammad ibn Yusuf al-Sanusi
2. Ahmad Zarruq
3. Ahmed Zouaoui
4. Muhammad al-Maghili
5. Abdelbasset Malti
6. Abdeldjalil Rachedi
7. Abderrahmane Ghobrini
8. Ahmed ben Zekri
9. Ali al-Bakri
10. Ali ibn Salama
11. Ali Talouti
12. Ibn Marzuq al-Kafif
13. Ismaïl Sendjasni
14. Mohamed Tenessi
15. Yaakoub al-Fassi

== Zawiya ==
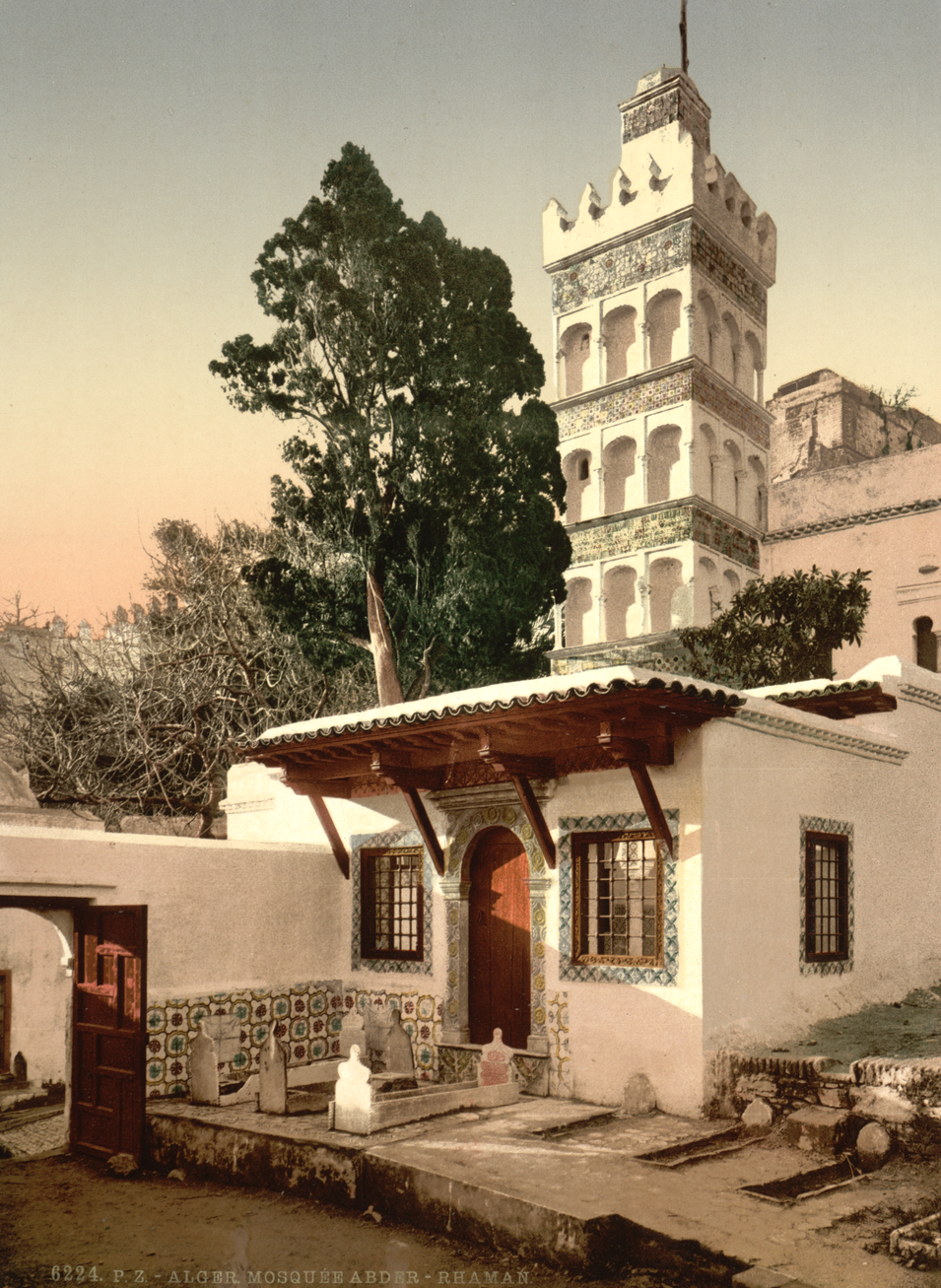
Zawiya (shrine) of Sidi Abder Rahman, in the Casbah of Algiers

The zawiya contains his tomb, though it is a misnomer since it does not contain any Sufi order in the building. Currently the location houses the tombs of several Algerian historical figures. The first construction dates to 1611 CE and has gone through several changes and additions since, with little left of the original today. In 1696 Dey al-Hadj Ahmed al-Euldji decided to turn it into a funeral mosque. More tombs have been added over the years. Today the mausoleum is often visited by locals of Algiers, especially on Fridays and religious holidays.

== Legacy ==
He left a legacy of more than 100 books, of which the most important was Al Jawahir Al hassān fi Tafsir Al Koran (the fine pearls in the exegesis of the Koran).

In his lifetime (1384-1479 CE) the region was split into three states whose legal schools stood out: Tunis, Tlemcen and Fez. The city of Algiers offered little in comparison in terms of religious and cultural pull. It had very few religious schools for teaching the Qur'an, hadith, and legal texts. Economically it also waned in comparison to other cities in the region. Abd al-Rahman al-Tha'alibi's founding of the Tha'alibiyya school attracted many students from all over the world. Families moved into the surrounding area which turned into a place of religious education and training. From then on, Algiers became known as "The city of Sidi Abd al-Rahman."

He is not to be confused with Ahmad ibn Muhammad al-Thalabi.

== Works ==
Haqaiq at-Tawhid (Realities of Oneness) by sheikh Abd al-Rahman al-Tha'libi

His works cover nearly every aspect of the Islamic sciences.

=== Exegesis and Qur'anic sciences (al-tafsîr wa al-qirâ'ât) ===
1. The brilliant jewels in the exegesis of the Koran ( al-Djawâhir al-hisân fî tafsîr al-qor'ân )
2. The stories of the Koran ( Nafâ'is al-murdjân fî qasas al-Qur'an )
3. The precious gold in the strange verses of the noble Koran ( al-Dhahab al-ibrîz fî gharîb al-qor'ân al-'azîz )
4. The chosen sources ( al-mukhtâr mina al-djawâmi ' )

=== Islamic Law (fiqh) ===
1. The Book of Rites (Al-djâmi 'fi ahqâm el' ibadat )
2. The great compilation (al-Djâmi 'al-kabîr)
3. The Garden of Lights ( Rawdat al-anwâr )
4. The Garden of Lights and the Walk of the Righteous (Rawdat al-anwâr wa nuzhat al-akhyâr)
5. Commentary of Ibn Hadjeb's breviary (Charh mukhtassar IbnHadjeb)
6. Commentary of Ibn Khalîl's breviary (Charh mukhtasr sidi Khalil).
7. Commentary by Ibn Haroun (Char Ibn Haroun)
8. Commentary on the main questions of Mudawwana (Charh 'uyûn masâ'il al-mudawwana)

=== Hadith ===
1. The selected sources ( al-Mukhtâr mina al-djawâmi ')
2. The Forty Hadiths of Morality (al-Arba'în hadith fî al-wa'z)
3. Commentary on the wisdoms of Ibn Arafa (Charh ghurar ibn 'Arafa)

=== Sufism ===
1. Truths about Sufism ( Haqâ'iq fi al-tasawwuf )
2. The Gardens of the Pious ( Ryyâd al-sâlihîn )
3. The gardens of the company in the science of subtleties and the journey of people of truth (Riyyâd al-uns fî 'ilm al-daqâ'iq wa siyar ahl al-haqâ'iq)
4. The direction of the traveler (Irchâd al-sâlik)

=== Theology (Aqida) ===
1. The noble sciences in the states of the other world ( al-'ulûm al-fâkhira fî al-nazar fî ahwâl al-âkhira )
2. The Book of Dreams ( Kitâb al-marâ'î )

=== Morals (al-wa'z) ===
1. The Direction for the Interest of the People (al-Irchâd limâ fîhi min masâlih al-'ibâd)
2. The compilation of wisdoms (Djâmi 'al fawâ'id).
3. The book of advice (Kitâb al-nasâ'ih)

=== Sira and History ===
1. The lights in the signs and miracles of the chosen Prophet ( al-anwâr fi ayât wa mu'djizât al-nabî al-mukhtâr )
2. The summary of the stories of the nations (Djâmi 'al himam fî akhbâr al-umam)
3. The journey to Allah (al-rihla ilâ Allah)

=== Arabic Language ===
1. The embellishment of the brothers in the conjugation of verses from the Koran (Tuhfat al-ikhwân fî i'râb ây al-qor'ân).
2. The lexicon and its summary (al-fahrast wa mukhtasarihâ)

=== Prayers and litanies (Dua) ===
1. The precious jewel (al-durr al-fâ'iq).
2. The very precious oath (al-'aqd al-nafîs)
3. The compilation of benefits (djâmi 'al-khayrât).

== See also ==
- List of Sufis
- List of Ash'aris and Maturidis
- List of Muslim theologians
- List of Algerians
- List of people from Boumerdès Province
- Algerian Islamic reference
- Muftis in Algiers
- Lists of mosques
- List of mosques in Africa
- List of mosques in Algeria
