= Awlad al-Imam =

14th-century Maliki jurists and brothers

- أولاد الإمام
- Born: Abu Zayd Abd al-Rahman and Abu Musa Isa c. 1262–1272 (Abd al-Rahman); Breshk
- Died: 1341 (Abu Zayd Abd al-Rahman); 1348 (Abu Musa Isa); Breshk
- Occupations: Jurists, muftis, teachers
- Children: Abu Salim Ibrahim; Abu Muhammad Abd al-Haqq; Abu Muhammad Abdallah
- Parent: Abu Abdallah Muhammad
- Relatives: Abu al-Fadl Muhammad (grandson); Abu al-Abbas Ahmad (great-grandson)

Academic work
- Era: 13th–14th century
- Discipline: Islamic jurisprudence
- School or tradition: Maliki
- Institutions: Madrasa of Awlad al-Imam al-Qarawiyyin
- Notable students: Muhammad al-Sharif al-Tilimsani; Muhammad ibn Marzuq al-Khatib; Muhammad al-Maqqari; Muhammad al-Abili

The Awlad al-Imam (Arabic: أولاد الإمام, lit. 'Sons of the Imam') refers to a learned family originally from Breshk (a now-vanished city in Algeria) that became closely associated with the scholarly milieu of Tlemcen. The name most commonly designates two brothers, Abu Zayd Abd al-Rahman (d. 1341) and Abu Musa Isa (d. 1348), who rose to prominence as Maliki jurists, muftis, and teachers during the 13th and 14th centuries (late 7th–8th centuries AH). Their reputation in biographical literature rests on their extensive training across major intellectual centers of the Maghrib and the Mashriq, as well as their close association with the Abd al-Wadid and Marinid ruling courts.

The epithet "Awlad al-Imam" is derived from the family's religious status. Their father, Abu Abd Allah Muhammad, served as the imam of Breshk and belonged to a lineage renowned for producing generations of prayer leaders. The brothers' lives shifted tragically following the murder of their father by a local conqueror, prompting them to flee their native city to pursue their Islamic education.

The two brothers eventually settled in Tlemcen, where they became highly influential religious authorities. Recognizing their distinguished standing, the Abd al-Wadid ruler Abu Hammu Musa I commissioned a dedicated religious complex for them around 1310. Comprising a madrasa, a mosque, and residences, this institutional foundation permanently attached their name to the site, of which only the minaret and the small mosque survive today.

While they taught primarily in Tlemcen, their pedagogical reach extended to other cities, including al-Quds. During a journey to the Mashriq, they famously engaged in a theological debate with the prominent scholar Ibn Taymiyyah, challenging his strictly literal interpretations of scripture. Although historical sources mention their writings, as for now no physical manuscripts of their works are known to have survived. Nevertheless, their influence as educators was immense; they taught a generation of renowned scholars, including Muhammad al-Maqqari, Ibn Marzuq al-Khatib, and Muhammad al-Abili and others. They also actively engaged in religious disputations (munadarat), records of which have been preserved in biographical and legal texts. They were widely venerated by their contemporaries as some of the most towering and authoritative religious figures of their era. The two brothers left descendants who continued this tradition of religious learning, several of whom were also renowned Islamic scholars.

== Early life and education ==
The brothers are referenced in historical works as originating from Breshk, a former city located between Ténès and Cherchell in present-day Algeria. Their exact birth dates are not recorded; however, it is presumed that Abu Zayd Abd al-Rahman was born during the second decade of the latter half of the 7th century AH (approximately 661–670 AH / 1262–1272). Their father, Abu Abdallah Muhammad ibn Abdallah, was a well-known imam of the city, and the family was recognized for producing generations of religious imams.

Abd al-Rahman received his early education in Breshk alongside his brother, Abu Musa Isa. Under their father's guidance, they studied and memorized the Quran. Both would later become widely known as Awlad al-Imam ("Sons of the Imam") with Abd al-Rahman being the elder of the two. The identities of the scholars from whom they received their education in their native city are not mentioned in the available historical sources.

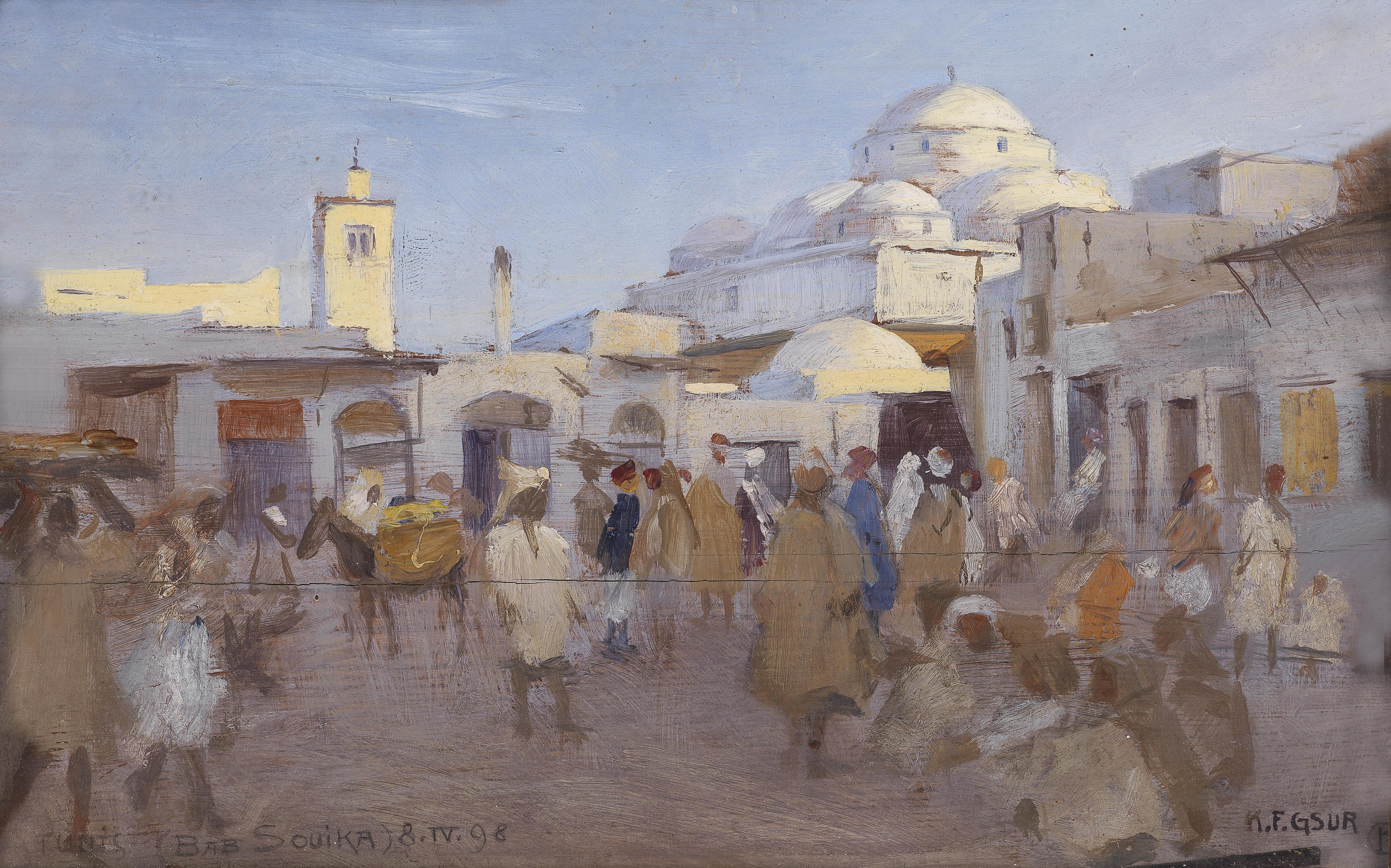
Street scene in the Medina of Tunis (painted in 1898 by Karl Friedrich Gsur). Abd al-Rahman and his brother traveled to this city to acquire religious knowledge from its scholars after fleeing Breshk

Following the siege of Bershk in 683 AH (c. 1284–1285) by Ziri ibn Manad al-Maklati, known as Zirim, the political situation in the city changed significantly. Ziri accused the brothers's father of holding a financial trust (wadiʿa) that allegedly belonged to his political adversaries. When the imam refused to surrender the funds, he was executed by order of the conqueror. After the death of their father and the instability that affected Bershk, the brothers left for Tunis (in present-day Tunisia) during the late 7th century AH (13th century). There, he attended the circles of prominent scholars such as Ahmad al-Batrini (d. 1310), ibn Jamaʿa al-Hawari (d. 1312), Abu Muhammad Abdallah al-Marjani (d. 699 AH / 1299–1300) and others. The historical record, however, presents some inconsistencies regarding the exact identification of some of his teachers. Some biographical works mention ibn al-Attar (as reported by al-Timbukti), while others cite ibn al-Qattan (according to Ibn Maryam). Abd al-Rahman ibn Khaldun does not provide specific names in this regard, whereas Muhammad ibn Muhammad Makhluf refers instead to Ahmad ibn al-Qassar.

After their studies in Tunis, they traveled to Fez (in present-day Morocco), where they continued their scholarly training. In Fez, they studied with several scholars and developed their skills in legal debate and jurisprudence. Among those associated with their studies were Muhammad ibn al-Siti and Ali ibn Abd al-Rahman al-Yafrani al-Tanji (d. 1333), who was known for his expertise in Islamic inheritance law (ʿilm al-faraʾid) and arithmetic. They also met disciples of Abu al-Qasim Ibn al-Zaytun during this period. Following their period of study in some of the major scholarly centers of the Maghrib, the two brothers sought to return to their native city Breshk. However, Ziri ibn Manad al-Maklati, who had ordered their father's execution, remained in power, rendering their continued presence there untenable. They therefore relocated to al-Jazaʾir (modern-day Algiers), where they settled and became active as teachers, transmitting the knowledge they had acquired.

In 705 AH (c. 1305–1306), the brothers relocated to Miliana (in present-day Algeria), the homeland of the Maghrawa tribes or they were in Tlemcen and, during the Marinid siege of the city, they left and moved to Miliana. In Miliana, they were received by Mandil ibn Muhammad al-Kanani, the local tax collector appointed by the Marinids (sahib al-jibaya). Recognizing their scholarly erudition, he held them in high esteem; he entrusted them with the education of his son Muhammad and appointed them to the judiciary, serving as the judges of the city.

== Career under the Abd al-Wadids ==
=== Settlement in Tlemcen ===
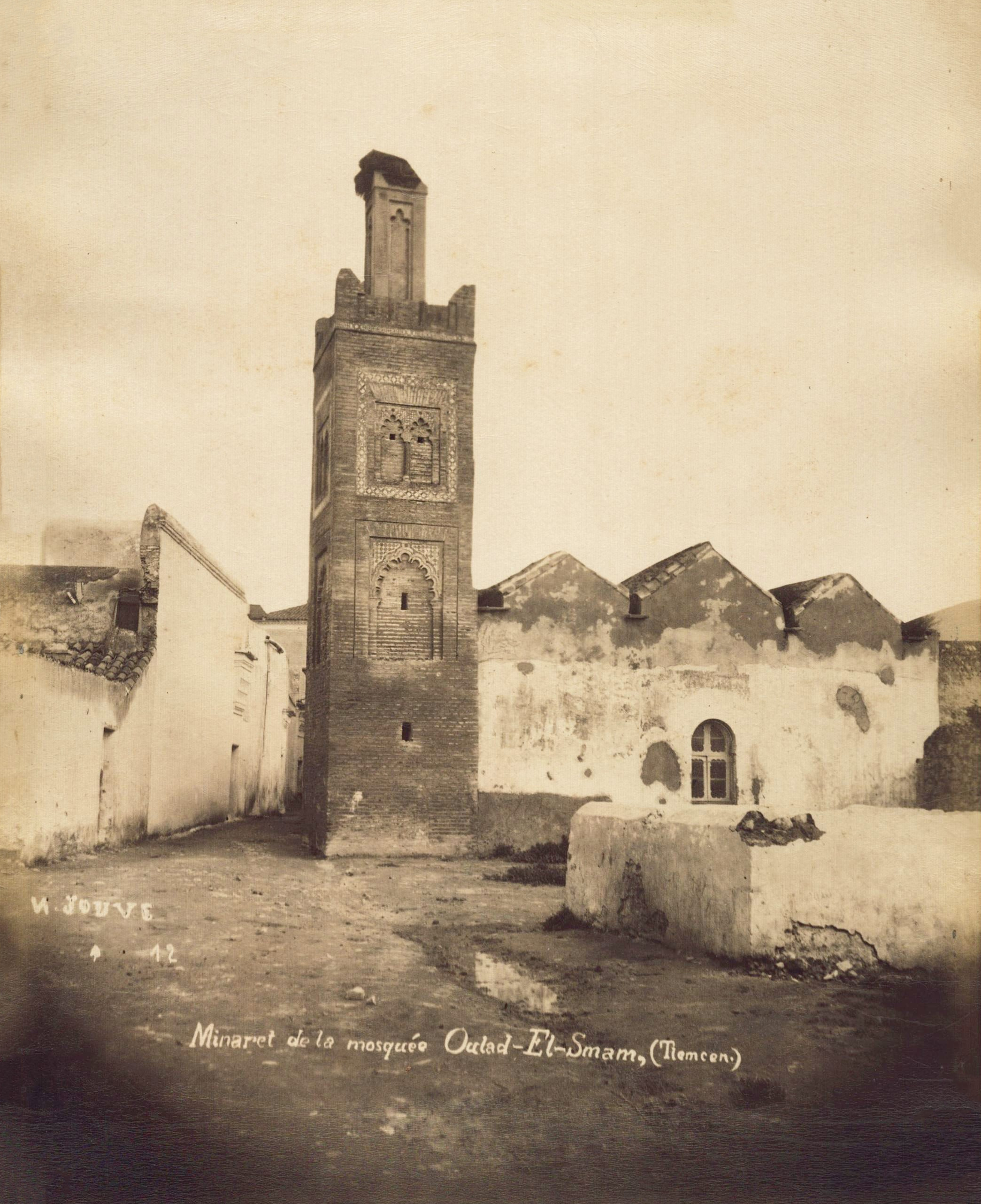
The minaret of the Awlad al-Imam Mosque in Tlemcen. The mosque was part of a former complex commissioned c. 1310 by Sultan Abu Hammu Musa I, established specifically for Abd al-Rahman and his brother to teach in.

In the aftermath of the Marinid siege of Tlemcen and the assassination of Sultan Abu Yaqub Yusuf, the former official Mandil ibn Muhammad al-Kanani went to Tlemcen and established ties with Abu Hammu Musa I (r. c. 1308 – 1318), the new ruler of the region. Recognizing the high scholarly standing of the two brothers, he brought them into close association with the court, where they were warmly received.

Around 1310, Abu Hammu Musa I commissioned the construction of a dedicated religious complex for the brothers located inside Bab Kashut, comprising a madrasa, (became known as al-Madrasa al-Qadima ("the Old Madrasa") after the new Madrasa was built) a mosque, and two residential houses. It was the first complex of its kind in Tlemcen and the wider region. This complex became associated with the name "Awlad al-Imam" ("Sons of the Imam"), in reference to them. The madrasa has not survived, and the mosque no longer retains its original structure, with the exception of the minaret and a few fragments of the interior decoration. The two brothers remained in the service of Abu Hammu Musa I, devoting themselves to the issuance of fatwas. He incorporated them into his inner circle and counted them among the notable members of his council.

When Abu Hammu Musa I restored control over the Maghrawa lands, including Miliana and the Chelif basin, Ziri al-Maklati sought to secure the Sultan's favor by declaring his submission and ceding the city of Breshk. Abu Zayd Abd al-Rahman, acting as the mediator for these negotiations, petitioned Abu Hammu Musa I for permission to avenge his father, whom Ziri al-Maklati had previously murdered. The Sultan granted his request, leading to a sanctioned plot and the assassination of al-Maklati in 708 AH (1308–1309 CE). This act of qisas resulted in the annexation of al-Maklati's territories and the restoration of the family's honor.

=== Under Abu Tashfin I ===
The two brothers Awlad al-Imam, remained influential teachers in Tlemcen, serving as close companions to Abu Hammu Musa I until the end of his rule. Their status did not waver even after the Sultan was killed by his son and successor, Abu Tashfin Abd al-Rahman I (r. c. 1318 – 1337); instead, the new ruler embraced the brothers just as his father had done. Throughout his reign, he continued to grant them royal protection and expressed a deep-seated reverence for their scholarly contributions.

At the same time, Abu Tashfin Abd al-Rahman I sought to bolster the architectural and intellectual development of his capital Tlemcen by diversifying its scholarly landscape. The erudition of another scholar, Abu Abdallah al-Salawi al-Tilimsani, caught the Sultan's attention, leading to his appointment as a teacher at the newly established Tashfiniya Madrasa. This move was deliberately designed to foster scholarly competition and create an intellectual counterbalance to the extensive influence the two brothers exercised from the madrasa built for them by his father Abu Hammu Musa I. The brothers remained within the inner circle of Abu Tashfin I for two years before eventually leaving for the Mashriq.

== Journey to the Mashriq ==
In 720 AH (1320), the two brothers journeyed to the Mashriq to perform the Hajj pilgrimage and visit al-Aqsa Mosque. Throughout their travels, they convened with venerable scholars, greatly benefiting from their expertise. Prominent among these figures were Ala al-Din al-Qunawi, who highly commended them; Jalal al-Din al-Qazwini; and Sharaf al-Din al-Zwawi al-Maliki, who imparted his knowledge to the brothers. Furthermore, they studied and formally narrated Sahih al-Bukhari under the preeminent traditionist Abu al-Abbas Ahmad al-Hajjar. It was also during this period that they engaged in a renowned theological debate with the prominent scholar ibn Taymiyyah. The brothers reportedly outperformed him and challenged his strictly literal interpretation of scripture, this confrontation is noted to have further compounded the tribulations and controversy surrounding Ibn Taymiyyah.

In al-Quds, the two scholars started teaching and quickly gained wide esteem. Large numbers of students attended their lessons to benefit from their broad learning. Muhammad al-Maqqari, the grandfather of Ahmad al-Maqqari, was in the city at the time and reportedly felt a measure of jealousy. Some of his Maghribi contemporaries discouraged him from taking any hostile step and urged him, if questioned, to present himself as associated with them in order to preserve his own reputation, given the general recognition of their scholarly and spiritual standing.

After returning to the Maghrib, the two brothers settled in Tlemcen with the support of Abu Tashfin Abd al-Rahman I. They devoted themselves to teaching at their madrasa, which emerged as a renowned center of learning. Their circles are said to have taught a number of later notable scholars, including Muhammad al-Sharif al-Tilimsani, Muhammad ibn Marzuq al-Khatib, Muhammad al-Maqqari, Abu Uthman Sa'id al-Uqbani, Abu Abdallah al-Yahsubi, and Muhammad al-Abili (teacher of Abd al-Rahman Ibn Khaldun) and others. During this time, the brothers' reputation continued to spread across the Maghrib.

== Marinid period and later years ==
=== Under Abu al-Hasan ===
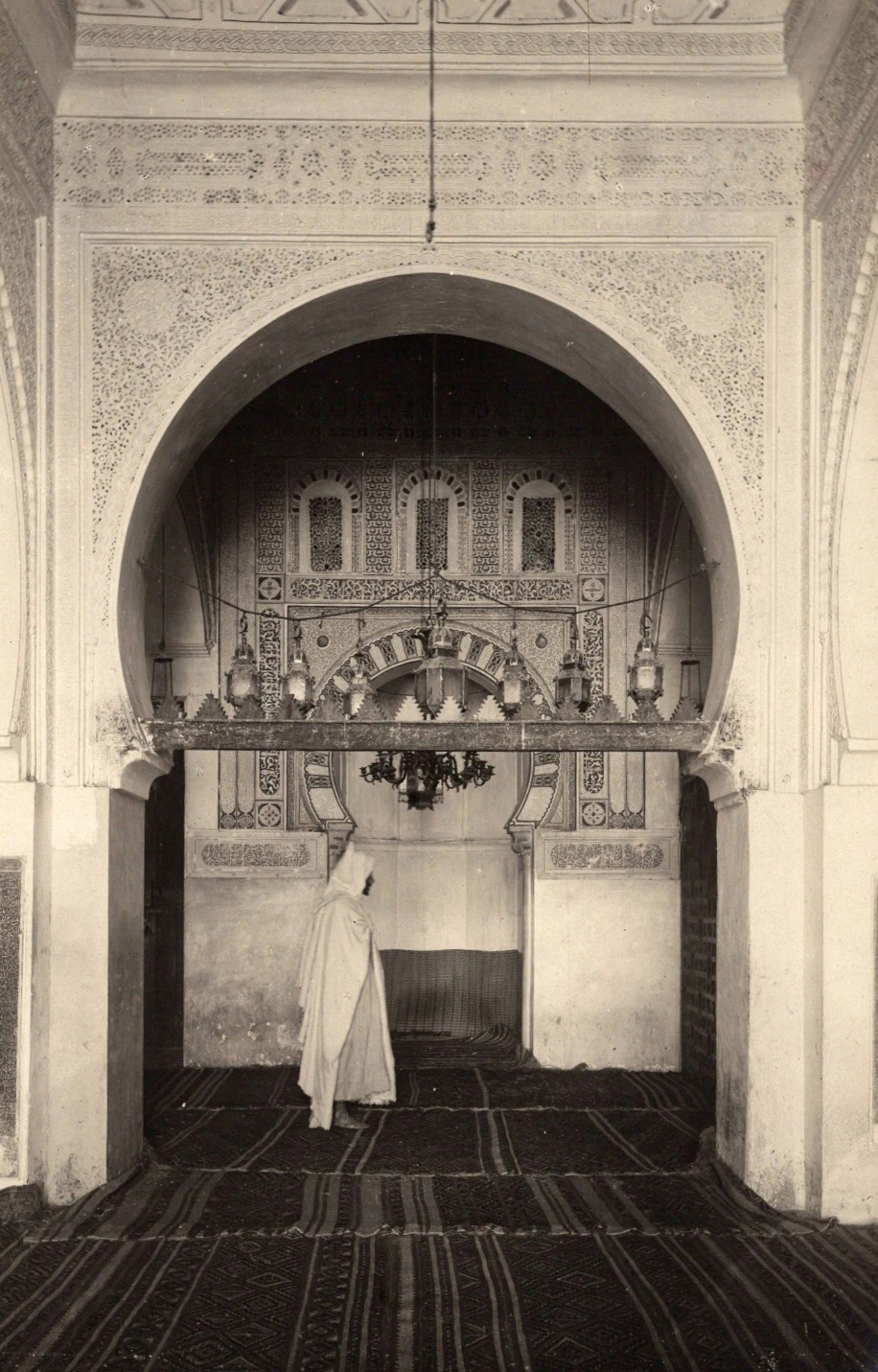
Intricately decorated mihrab of the Mosque of al-Ubbad, Tlemcen, shown in a 19th-century photograph. The brothers opposed its embellishments, arguing that they could distract worshippers during prayer.

In 737 AH (1337), as the Marinids captured Tlemcen and Abu Tashfin I was killed, Sultan Abu al-Hasan (r. c. 1331 – 1348) drew the two brothers, Abu Zayd Abd al-Rahman and Abu Musa Isa, into his inner circle. In the immediate aftermath of the occupation, they advised him to restrain his troops, halt the looting of Tlemcen, and safeguard the local population from harm. During this Marinid occupation, a religious debate emerged in connection with the building program at the Mosque of al-Ubbad, sponsored by the sultan and completed around 1339. When the decoration of the mihrab became a matter of discussion, the brothers advised the sultan to remove the ornate embellishments, arguing that intricate designs could distract worshippers and weaken concentration during prayer. Muhammad ibn Marzuq al-Khatib, closely associated with the Marinids, disagreed and recommended keeping the decoration, maintaining that a sincere believer can remain focused regardless of surrounding ornamentation.

=== Military campaigns and deaths ===
As members of the Marinid Sultan Abu al-Hasan's inner circle, the brothers accompanied him on various military campaigns to suppress rebellions. Such was the Sultan's respect for them that he occasionally exempted them from the rigors of travel. They were present during the expedition to the Iberian Peninsula and witnessed the Battle of Tarifa (1340), alongside notable figures such as Ibn Marzuq al-Khatib and Muhammad al-Abili. Shortly after this battle, in mid-Ramadan 741 AH (1341), Abu Zayd Abd al-Rahman died and was likely buried in his native city Breshk.

Abu Musa Isa continued to accompany the Sultan during his expeditions, and even during these travels, students would gather to learn from him. For instance, during Isa's brief stay in Tunis (1347) alongside Sultan Abu al-Hasan, Abd al-Rahman Ibn Khaldun frequently studied under him and benefited from his knowledge. The poet Abu al-Qasim al-Rahwi celebrated the scholar's arrival in Tunis, composing verses to praise his presence. He poetically declared, "With the departure of The Sons of the imam, Tlemcen's nose could no longer be held high in pride above the cities of the world.

This situation endured until the political order was shaken by the Battle of al-Qayrawan in 1348, where Abu al-Hasan suffered a decisive defeat and died shortly afterward. Amid this turmoil, his son, Abu Inan Faris, proclaimed himself ruler of the Marinids. By this time, Abu Musa Isa was advanced in age and increasingly concerned with his family. He therefore requested permission to remain in Tlemcen to care for his children. The request was granted, and he withdrew from political life, returning instead to his household and scholarly pursuits. He later returned to his home city of Breshk, where he subsequently died during the ravages of the Black Death in 1348.

The relationship between the Marinid sultan Abu al-Hasan and the two brothers is primarily reported in the writings of Ibn Marzuq. However, he deliberately omits aspects of their ties to the Abd al-Wadid rulers, Abu Hammu I and his successor Abu Tashfin I. This includes their presence at the royal court and the commissioning of a madrasa specifically built for them to teach in. Instead, Ibn Marzuq repeatedly emphasizes their association with Abu al-Hasan. Due to his close ties with the Marinids, he wanted to downplay the brothers' connection to their Abd al-Wadid rivals and obscure the patronage these two eminent scholars received from them.

== Scholarly legacy ==
=== Teachings and students ===
The two brothers taught also at the al-Qarawiyyin in Fez. Among those who received knowledge from them at the mosque were several ent scholars, including Muhammad al-Maqqari, and Muhammad al-Sharif al-Tilimsani. Other students mentioned include Khalid ibn Isa al-Balawi and Abu al-Qasim Muhammad ibn Hasan al-Husayni.

The brothers Abu Zayd Abd al-Rahman and Abu Musa Isa were widely venerated by major ulamas. Due to the comprehensive education they received in Tlemcen and across the metropolises of the Islamic Maghrib and Mashriq, eminent contemporaries frequently praised them for their knowledge and virtue. The jurist Ibn Marzuq hailed them as: "the two unique Sheikhs [respected scholars] and Imams [leading religious authorities], the Imams of their time." The Andalusian polymath Ibn al-Khatib described them as: "the two towering eminent figures of Tlemcen, its two firmly grounded scholars." From the eastern Islamic world, al-Qazwini declared: "The Maghrib [western Islamic world] takes pride in the likes of them." Later, al-Wansharisi lauded their authority as: "the two firmly grounded and towering Sheikhs, the two learned Muftis" and Ahmad Baba al-Timbukti echoed this reputation, calling them: "the erudite qadis [Islamic judges], the last of the eminent leading figures of the Maghrib, recognized by fair testimony in both the Mashriq [eastern Islamic world] and the Maghrib." For Ibn Farhun, Abd al-Rahman was the Sheikh of all the Maliki scholars of Tlemcen.

=== Works and disputations ===
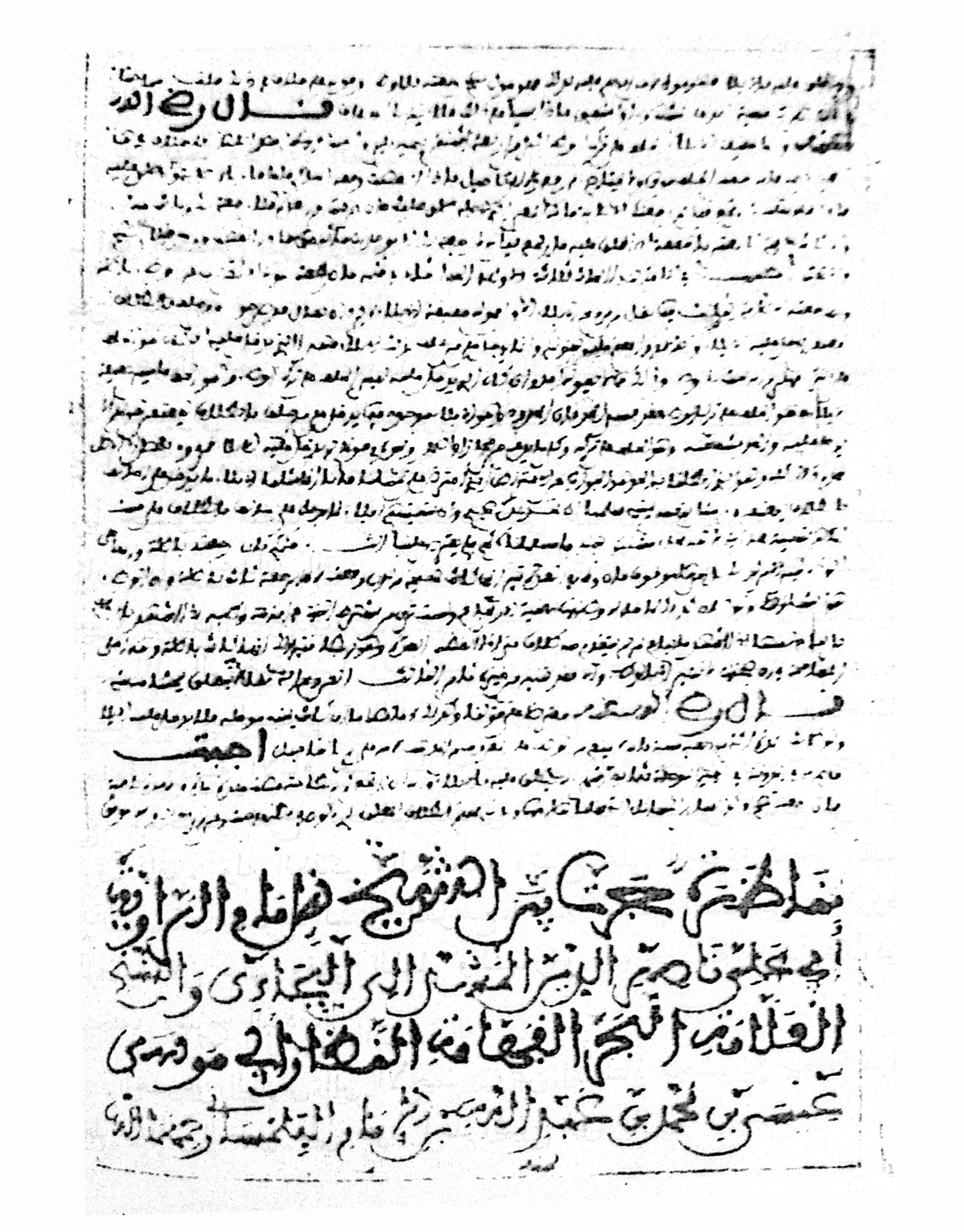
Manuscript folio from the Nawazil of Ibn Marzuq. The text in bold at the bottom records a debate between Isa (son al-Imam) and the scholar Nasir al-Din Mansur al-Mashadali.

No works by the two brothers are known to have survived to the present day. The principal biographical account is that of Ibn Farhun, who notes that they authored numerous texts but does not record their titles. Ibn Maryam notes that Abd al-Rahman wrote a sharh (commentary) on Ibn al-Hajib's Mukhtasar. The apparent loss of their writings may be attributed to the nature of their careers, which were characterized by a heavy engagement in teaching and constant travel.

Despite their lack of known works, records of their munadarat (religious disputations) have been preserved, such as the one at the court of the Abd al-Wadid sultan Abu Tashfin I, which took place in the presence of their student Muhammad al-Maqqari and is referenced by al-Wansharisi in his notable work al-Mi'yar al-Mughrib. Furthermore, the nawazil of Ibn Marzuq document additional munadarat, including a debate between one of the brothers, Abu Musa Isa, and Nasir al-Din Mansur al-Mashadali.

== Family and descendants ==
The grandfather of this family, Abd Allah Ibn al-Imam, was regarded as a righteous saint. He was famous as 'the Imam' and was widely known by this title, with his sons inheriting the leadership of prayer after him. His grandsons, the two brothers Abu Zayd Abd al-Rahman and Abu Musa Isa, benefited greatly from the vibrant scholarly landscape established by the Abd al-Wadid rulers in Tlemcen and the influx of ulamas there, complementing the knowledge they acquired during their travels across several Islamic cities.

This scholarly lineage continued beyond the two brothers, biographical sources identify several descendants who carried on the family's tradition. On Abu Zayd Abd al-Rahman's side, his son Abu Salim Ibrahim (d. 1397) fathered Abu al-Fadl Muhammad (d. 1441), who in turn had a son named Abu al-Abbas Ahmad. On Abu Musa Isa's side, two sons are documented: Abu Muhammad Abd al-Haqq and Abu Muhammad Abdallah (fl. 1390). However, the lineage did not expand widely. Al-Wansharisi (d. 1508) noted that the family had significantly dwindled by his era, surviving primarily through Abu al-Fadl Muhammad. Abu al-Fadl left behind only a single scholar son, Abu al-Abbas Ahmad, who studied directly under al-Wansharisi.

Abdallah (al-Imam) عبد الله (الإمام)
Abu Abdallah Muhammad (Imam of Breshk, d. c. 1284) أبو عبد الله محمد
The Two Famous Scholars (Awlad al-Imam) أولاد الإمام
Abu Zayd Abd al-Rahman (d. 1341) أبو زيد عبد الرحمن	Abu Musa Isa (d. 1348) أبو موسى عيسى
Abu Salim Ibrahim (d. 1397) أبو سالم إبراهيم	Abu Muhammad Abd al-Haqq أبو محمد عبد الحق	Abu Muhammad Abdallah (fl. 1390) أبو محمد عبد الله
Abu al-Fadl Muhammad (d. 1441) أبو الفضل محمد
Abu al-Abbas Ahmad أبو العباس أحمد

== See also ==
- Awlad al-Imam mosque
- Madrasa of Awlad al-Imam
- Ibn Marzuq al-Khatib
