= Abu al-Fadl Muhammad ibn al-Imam =

Maliki scholar from Tlemcen (15th century)

Muhammad ibn al-Imam
- Born: Tlemcen
- Died: 845 AH (c. 1441–1442); Tlemcen
- Arabic name
- Personal (Ism): Muhammad محمد
- Patronymic (Nasab): Ibn Ibrahim ibn Abd al-Rahman ibn Muhammad ibn Abdallah ابن ابراهيم ابن عبد الرحمان ابن محمد ابن عبد الله
- Teknonymic (Kunya): Abu al-Fadl أبو الفضل
- Toponymic (Nisba): al-Tilimsani التلمساني

Abu al-Fadl Muhammad ibn al-Imam (Arabic: أبو الفضل محمد ابن الإمام; d. 845 AH/ c. 1441) was a Tlemcen-born Maliki jurist and polymath from the prominent Awlad al-Imam (“Sons of the Imam”) family. He taught in major centers of learning in the western and eastern Islamic world, including Damascus and al-Quds, where his study circles attracted students. Biographical sources credit him with introducing several influential works to the Maghrib, including al-Shamil by Bahram al-Damiri, and with contributing to the transmission of Maliki jurisprudence and the rational sciences in the Maghrib.

== Biography ==
Abu al-Fadl was born in Tlemcen into the renowned Awlad al-Imam (Sons of the Imam) family, a lineage of distinguished scholars who held a high status in the Islamic world. He was the son of Ibrahim, who was the son of Abd al-Rahman ibn al-Imam. His grandfather Abd al-Rahman and his great-uncle, Isa ibn al-Imam, were the preeminent scholars of their era. In recognition of their religious and social standing, the Zayyanid Sultan Abu Hammu Musa I commissioned a religious complex dedicated to them, which comprised a madrasa, a mosque, and residential houses for them.

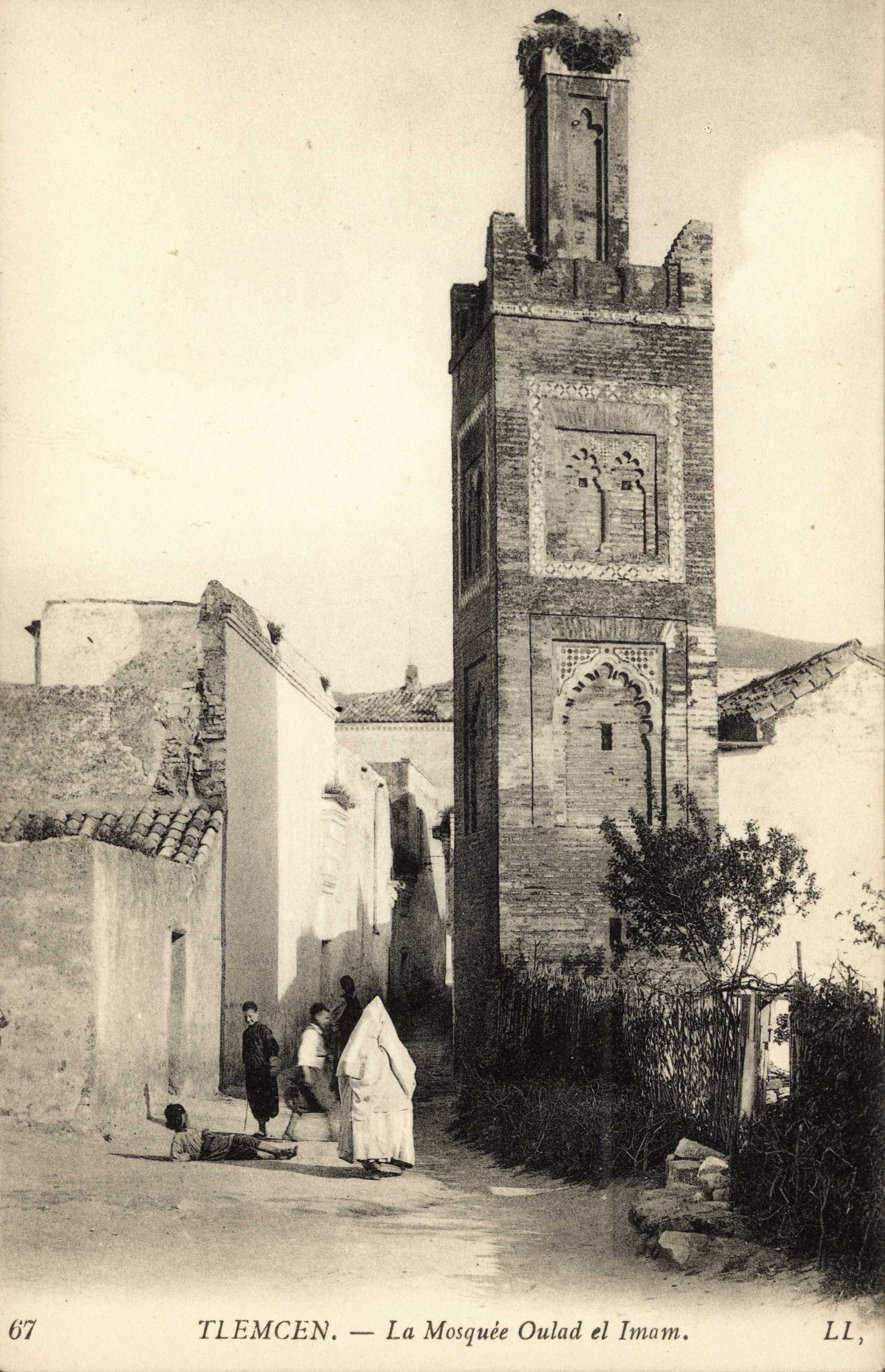
Minaret of Awlad al-Imam Mosque. Abu al-Fadl Muhammad was born into this distinguished scholarly family, whose status was so high that the Sultan built them this complex comprising a madrasa, mosque, and residences.

Growing up in this environment of scholarship, Abu al-Fadl completed his initial education and knowledge acquisition in his native Tlemcen. He studied under the city's leading figures, most notably the jurist Sa'id al-Uqbani. He was a peer (qarin) of the scholar Ibn Marzuq al-Hafid. Seeking to further his studies, he moved to Tunis in the year 810 AH (1407–1408) and stayed there for a month. He then embarked on a journey to the Mashriq (Islamic East), he first stayed in what is now Egypt, where he visited both Cairo and Misr (Fustat). From there, he proceeded to the Hejaz to perform the Hajj pilgrimage and visit the Islamic holy sites, including the Bayt al-Maqdis and the tomb of the Prophet Muhammad in Medina. Following the conclusion of the pilgrimage season, he returned to Cairo before traveling to al-Sham (Levant) in 812 AH (c.1410), in Damascus, according to al-Sakhawi, students flocked to him upon recognizing his scholarly competence, eager to learn from him. He eventually settled in al-Quds, where he dedicated himself to teaching in its mosques and madrasas while simultaneously working to expand his own intellectual horizons. His study circles attracted a large influx of students, and he demonstrated such high capability and competence that he gained widespread fame in the region, greatly benefiting his students.

A number of distinguished scholars studied under him, including Ibn Marzuq al-Kafif (1422–1495), Muhammad al-Tanasi (chronicler of Zayyanids), Taqi al-Din al-Shumunni (d. 1468), and Abu al-Hasan al-Qalasadi, the Granadan mathematician. Al-Qalasadi mentioned Abu al-Fadl in his travelogue Rihla, testifying to the breadth of his knowledge and describing him as a "jurist (faqih), an Imam, and a scholar in the rational sciences (ulum al-ma'qul). He played a role in the transmission of knowledge from the Mashriq to the Maghreb, being credited as the first scholar to introduce several works to the Maghreb. These included the Shamil by the faqih Bahram ibn Abd Allah al-Damiri, an encyclopedic work on Maliki jurisprudence, along with Bahram's authoritative commentary on the Mukhtasar of Khalil. He also introduced the glosses (Hawashi) of the scholar al-Taftazani on the commentary of al-Adud al-Iji, a work focused on the foundations of legal theory Usul al-Fiqh. Additionally, he brought the commentary of Ibn Hilal on the Mukhtasar al-Far'i (a work on practical legal branches) by Ibn al-Hajib, and other works.

Abu al-Fadl was held in high esteem by his contemporaries and later biographers for his mastery of diverse disciplines. Muhammad al-Tanasi praised him, recording various anecdotes that highlighted his knowledge and virtues, while the historian al-Maqrizi (1364–1442) noted his polymathic nature, stating that he "rarely failed to participate in any science or art".Al-Wansharisi (d. 1508) further confirmed that Abu al-Fadl possessed a "firm footing" in al-Bayan (Arabic rhetoric), Sufism, Medicine, and Arabic poetry.

Abu al-Fadl died in the year 845 AH (c. 1441–1442), leaving behind a son, Abu al-Abbas Ahmad, who was a contemporary of Ibn Maryam (d. 1615 the author of al-Bustan) and became his teacher.

== See also ==
- Muhammad al-Abili
- Muhammad al-Maqqari
- Muhammad al-Sharif al-Tilimsani
