= Madrasa of Awlad al-Imam =

14th-century madrasa in Tlemcen, Algeria

- مدرسة أولاد اللإمام
- Interactive map of the Madrasa of Awlad al-Imam area

General information
- Type: Madrasa
- Location: Al-Matmar quarter, near Bab Kashut, Tlemcen, Algeria
- Coordinates: 34°52′53″N 1°18′48″W
- Named for: Awlad al-Imam
- Completed: c. 1310, CE

The Madrasa of Awlad al-Imam (Arabic: مدرسة أولاد الإمام, romanized: Madrasat Awlad al-Imam) is a historic madrasa in Tlemcen, Algeria. It was commissioned by the Abd al-Wadid ruler Abu Hammu Musa I. Construction likely began in 1307 and was completed in 1310. Recognized as the earliest known madrasa in Tlemcen, it was established to honor two prominent scholar brothers, Abu Zayd Abd al-Rahman and Abu Musa Isa, who were collectively known as Awlad al-Imam ("Sons of the Imam").

Originally, the religious complex consisted of a mosque, a madrasa with two teaching iwans, and dedicated residential units to accommodate the two scholars. It rapidly developed into an important center of teaching in the Maghrib. The institution attracted numerous disciples, and it is probable that notable scholars, such as Muhammad al-Abili and Muhammad al-Sharif al-Tilimsani, and others received instruction there. Later in its history, it became known as the "Old Madrasa" (al-Madrasa al-Qadima) to distinguish it from the newer Tashfiniya Madrasa established by Abu Tashfin Abd al-Rahman I.

Over the centuries, the complex fell into a state of severe decline. Historical accounts from scholars such as Ahmad al-Maqqari indicate that the library of the madrasa was abandoned and filled with refuse, reflecting a broader decline in the scholarly activity of the city. Today, the madrasa and its dependencies have entirely disappeared beneath later urban development . Only the mosque of the Awlad al-Imam complex survives, particularly its minaret, though much of its original architectural form has been lost .

== Background ==
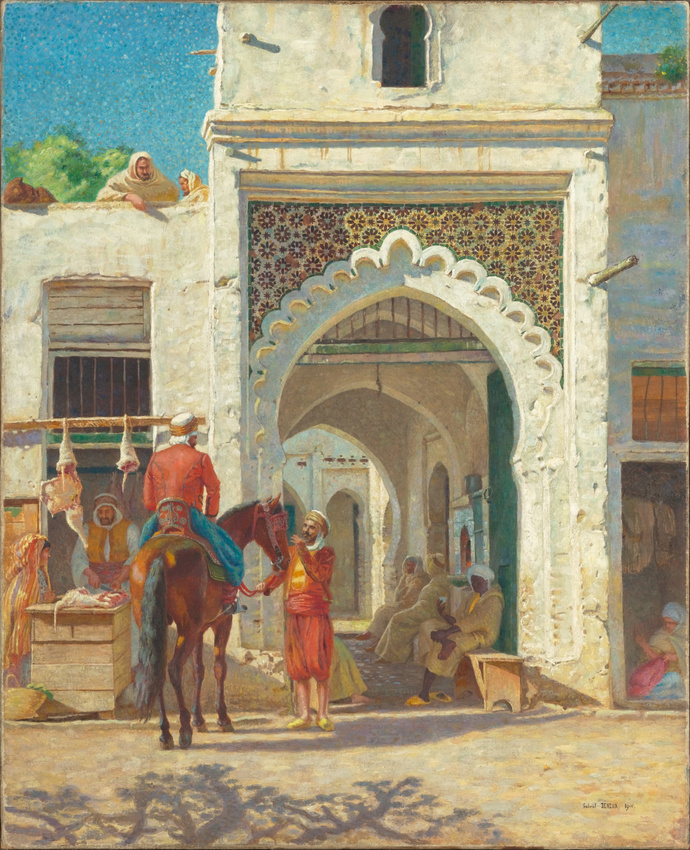
A painted street view of Tlemcen, the city that hosted the two scholars and where a religious complex was built in their honor, by Gabriel-Charles Deneux (Louvre)

Abu Hammu Musa I (r. c. 1308 – 1318) was the fourth ruler of the Abd al-Wadid (also known as the Zayyanid) dynasty. His reign focused on repairing Tlemcen following the long Marinid siege and recovering the tribal territories that had escaped the authority of the dynasty. Described by Ibn Khaldun as a sharp and imposing leader, he pioneered the transition from nomadic customs to formal courtly protocol and administrative systems. A sagacious ruler, he was a dedicated patron of literature and science who sought the company of distinguished intellectuals.

Among the most prominent scholars associated with his reign were the two brothers known as Awlad al-Imam ("Sons of the Imam"): Abu Zayd Abd al-Rahman and Abu Musa Isa. Originating from Breshk, a now-vanished city near present-day Ténès, in Algeria, they belonged to a respected family of religious imams. Their lives were drastically altered following the assassination of their father, prompting them to travel across several cities to complete their education. They eventually earned an esteemed status among contemporary scholars. Recognizing their prestige, Abu Hammu Musa I welcomed the brothers to his capital, Tlemcen. To honor them, the sultan commissioned the construction of a comprehensive religious complex that included a mosque, a madrasa, and adjoining residences, providing them with a dedicated space to live and teach. This religious complex became associated with their name, Awlad al-Imam, and developed into an important center of teaching in the Maghrib.

== History ==
=== Fondation ===
This late Sultan [Abu Hammu Musa I] left behind beautiful monuments and a good legacy; he was a lover of knowledge and its people. Following the death of Yusuf ibn Yaqub, the two learned jurists, Abu Zayd and Abu Musa, the sons of the Imam, arrived at his court. He saw no better way to express his gratitude to God for the blessing He had bestowed upon him [namely the slaying of his enemy and the hastening of relief] than by patronizing knowledge and upholding its rights. Therefore, he honored their stay, celebrated their arrival, and built for them the madrasa that bears their name.

— Muhammad al-Tanasi

The Madrasa of Awlad al-Imam, is the earliest known madrasa in Tlemcen. It was commissioned by the Abd al-Wadid ruler Abu Hammu Musa I shortly after he came to power. Construction of the religious complex likely began in 707 AH (c. 1307) and was completed in 710 AH (c. 1310). The madrasa originally consisted of two iwans used for teaching, in addition to classrooms and two residential units intended to accommodate the two scholars.

In this period, madrasas functioned not only as institutions of instruction but also as spaces for Qur’anic exegesis and scholarly debate. The Awlad al-Imam held a significant position at court. Abu Hammu I entrusted them with matters of consultation (shura) and the issuing of legal opinions (fatwa), lacing them among his closest advisers and the foremost notables of his rule.

Extant historical sources lack detailed accounts of the madrasa's official inauguration; the documentation is largely confined to panegyrical references highlighting the pious and architectural achievements of Abu Hammu Musa I. Likewise, few details are known about its construction or its architectural decoration.

=== Location ===
The madrasa was located near Bab Kashut (gate), within the city ramparts in the al-Matmar quarter, an area associated with silos and the storage of provisions. Today, the district is also known as Hawmat Awlad al-Imam. The construction of the madrasa at a distance from the Great Mosque, may reflect the ruler's intention to encourage the development of a new residential and intellectual district structured around the Madrasa.

The complex later became known as al-Madrasa al-Qadima (the "Old Madrasa") to distinguish it from al-Madrasa al-Jadida (the "New Madrasa"), also known as the Tashfiniya Madrasa. The latter was the second madrasa constructed in Tlemcen, founded by the son and successor of Abu Hammu Musa I, Abu Tashfin Abd al-Rahman I.

Abu Tashfin sought to bolster the architectural and intellectual development of his capital by diversifying its scholarly landscape. The erudition of another scholar, Abu Abdallah al-Salawi al-Tilimsani, caught the Sultan's attention, leading to his appointment as a teacher at the newly established Tashfiniya Madrasa. This move was deliberately designed to foster scholarly competition and create an intellectual counterbalance to the extensive influence the Awlad al-Imam brothers exercised from the madrasa built for them by his father. It may also have reflected practical considerations, as the Awlad al-Imam madrasa was likely no longer sufficient to accommodate the growing number of students.

=== Archaeological excavations ===
Archaeological investigations carried out during the French colonial period led to the discovery of two translucent onyx marble plaques in the nearby ruins of the former complex, bearing inscriptions detailing habous (endowments). These endowed properties comprised a variety of commercial and agricultural assets. Within the city, it included 30 shops, a mill, a kiln, an oven, a bathhouse (hammam), and an inn (funduq). Outside the city walls, the endowment also encompassed olive groves, a pressing facility, and all the upper mills situated at the Abu Ya'la citadel. The terms of the trust dictated that the income generated from these properties be used to financially support the scholars and students, as well as the mosque's imam and muezzins.

Although initially presumed to belong to the Awlad al-Imam religious complex, it was later determined that these plaques actually concern the endowments of the al-Yaqubiyya religious complex, a later religious institution built by Sultan Abu Hammu II (r. 1359–1389). More recent excavations conducted at the site in 2010 have provided further clarification regarding the mosque's original layout. Researchers proposed that the mosque did not originally contain an internal sahn (courtyard). Instead, the evidence indicates that the courtyard was likely external, serving as a transitional space linking the madrasa to the mosque.

== Decline and notable scholars ==
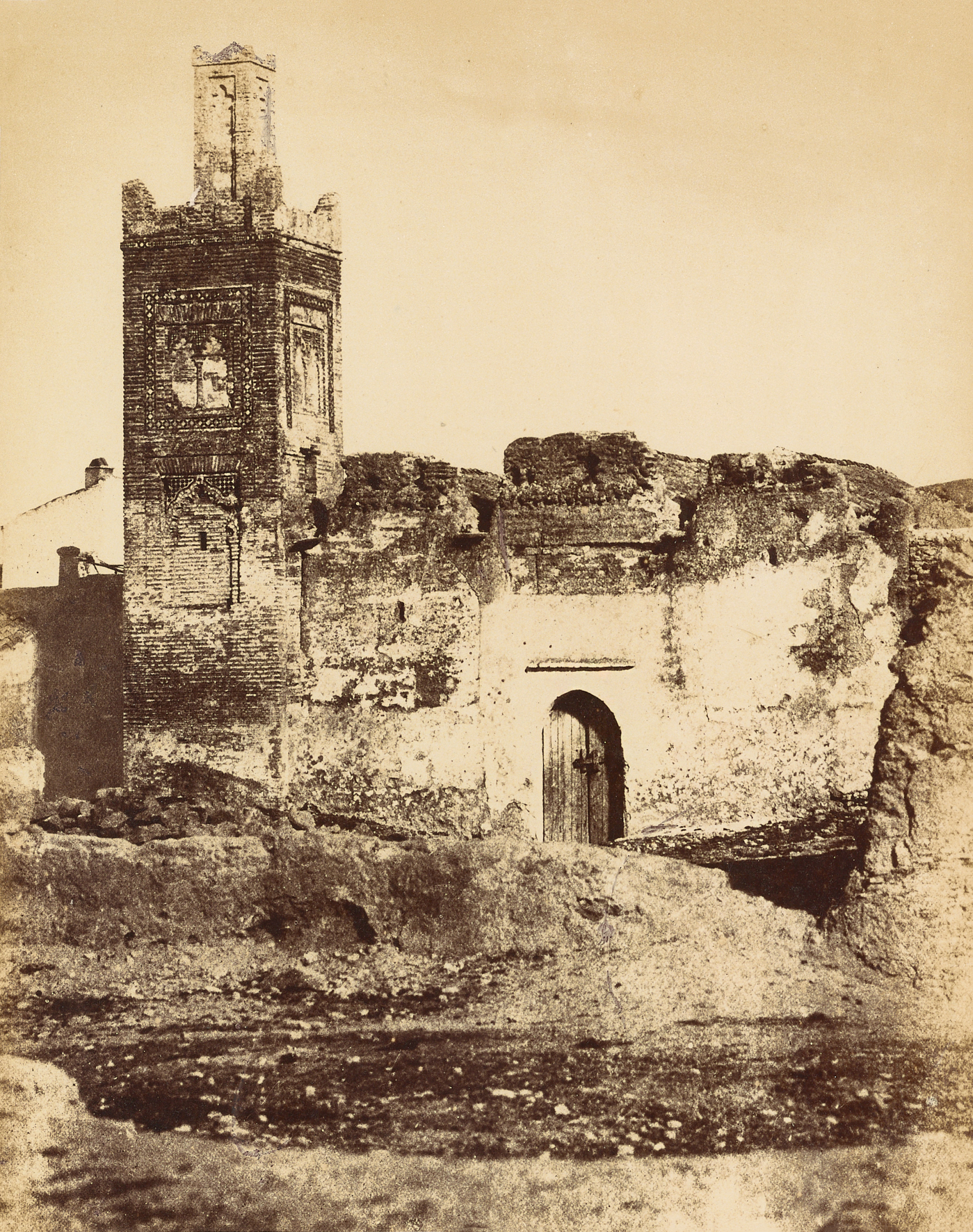
The ruins of the mosque and its dependencies, as captured between 1853 and 1864 during the French colonial period.

Only the mosque of the Awlad al-Imam complex survives today, particularly its minaret. Much of its early original form has been lost, and the madrasa together with its dependencies has entirely disappeared beneath later urban development.

Nevertheless, earlier sources indicate that the madrasa remained standing for several centuries after its foundation. The renowned scholar Ahmad al-Maqqari (d. 1632), a native of Tlemcen, provide a testimony, during his visited the site around 1010 AH (c. 1601) in the company of the faqih Ali Abahlul and a group of scholars and notable figures. He mentions that they “went to the famous madrasa in the Maghrib known as the madrasa of Awlad al-Imam,” describing how they examined its beauty and passed through its remaining structures until they reached its well-known library, which they found abandoned and filled with refuse. Astonished by this state of neglect, al-Maqqari records a brief poetic, concluding that “in its quarters [the madrasa] no man of merit remains.” His testimony indicates that the madrasa was still standing in 1601, although it was likely no longer functioning as a center of instruction, reflecting a broader decline in scholarly activity in Tlemcen.

More than two centuries later, Jean-Joseph-Léandre Bargès, the Catholic priest who visited the city in 1846, reported having observed the remains of the madrasa, which occupied the site mentioned by Yahya ibn Khaldun (d. 1378), located within the city near Bab Kashut.

While the available historical sources do not explicitly identify the individuals educated at the madrasa, they indicate that numerous disciples received instruction there. It is therefore probable that the following notable scholars were among those who attended the madrasa:

List of some notable students
Scholar	Dates
Muhammad al-Abili	d. 757 AH (c. 1356)
Sa'id ibn al-Uqbani	b. 720 AH (c. 1321)
Muhammad al-Sharif al-Tilimsani	710–771 AH (c. 1310–1370)
Muhammad al-Maqqari	d. 759 AH (c. 1358)
Ahmad ibn Sa'id al-Madyuni	-
Ahmad ibn Umar al-Baqqai	-
Muhammad al-Yahsubi al-Tilimsani	fl. 799 AH (c. 1396)

== See also ==
- Tashfiniya Madrasa
- Madrasa of al-Hasan ibn Makhluf
- Madrasa of Minshar al-Jild
- Madrasa of Sidi al-Halwi
