= Madrasa of Sidi al-Halwi =

14th-century historic madrasa in Tlemcen, Algeria

The Madrasa of Sidi al-Halwi (Arabic: مدرسة سيدي الحلوي, romanized: Madrasat Sidi al-Halwi) was a historic madrasa located in Tlemcen, Algeria. Established in the mid-14th century during the Marinid occupation of the city, the madrasa was commissioned by Abu Inan Faris as a component of the larger religious complex of Sidi al-Halwi. This complex, composed of a mosque, a zawiya, the madrasa, and an ablutions facility, was built outside the historic city walls near the Bab Ziri quarter. The institution and its surrounding sanctuary were built to honor Abu Abdallah al-Shudhi, an Andalusian scholar, former judge, and Sufi mystic popularly known as Sidi al-Halwi.

The madrasa was lost over the centuries, likely falling into ruin during the Ottoman period. Today, the adjacent historic mosque and ablutions facility are the primary surviving remnants of the original site.

== Background ==
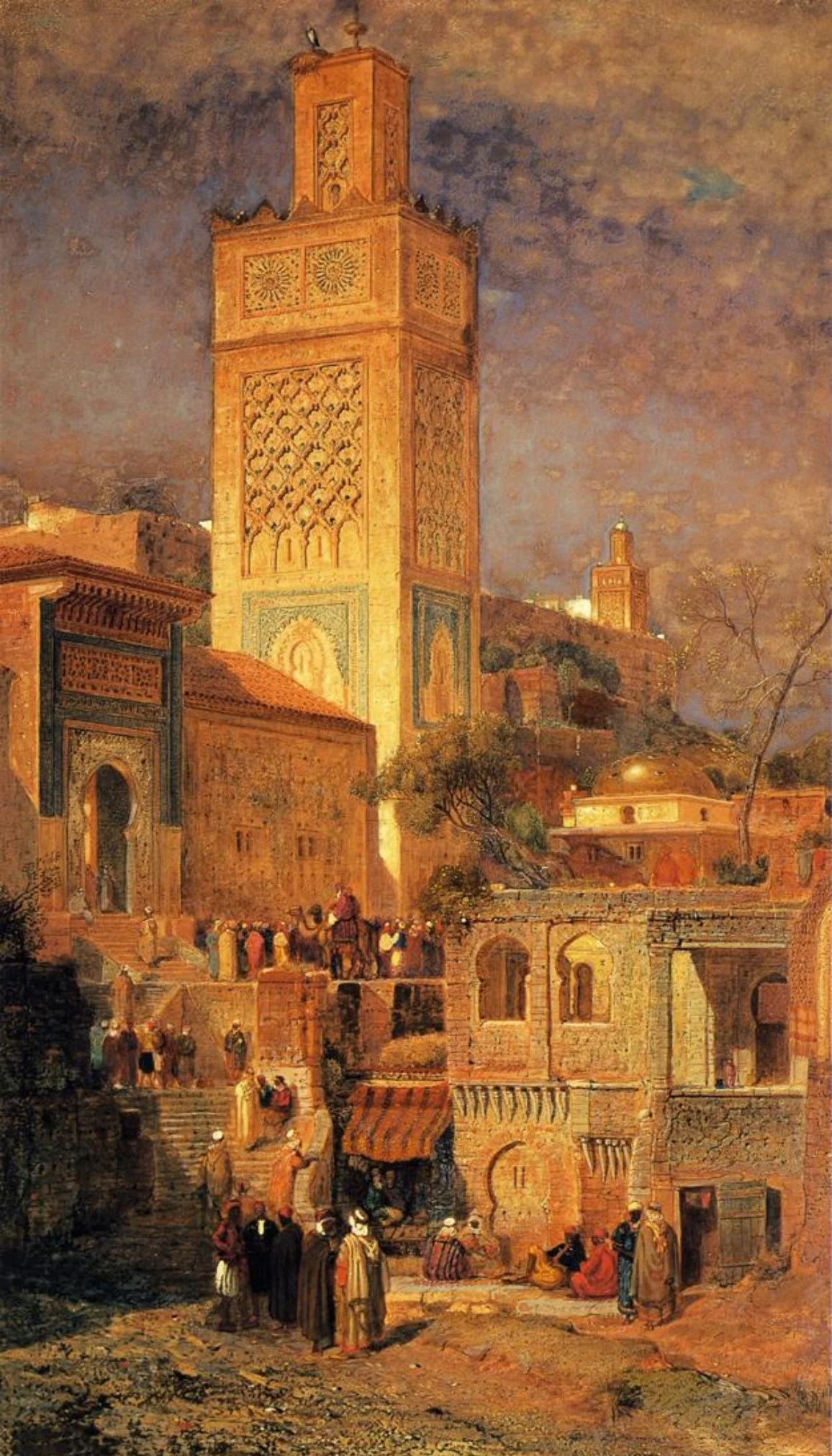
Samuel Colman's 1875 painting of the surviving Sidi al-Halwi mosque. The madrasa originally sat adjacent to it.

The religious complex of Sidi al-Halwi was founded in Tlemcen during the mid-14th century, amidst the Marinid occupation (c. 1352–1359) that followed the city's seizure from the Abd al-Wadid (Zayyanid) dynasty. Commissioned by Abu Inan Faris (r. c. 1348 – 1358), the site comprises a mosque, a zawiya, an ablutions facility, and a madrasa, which were constructed by local Tlemcenian ateliers. The ensemble was centered around the burial site of Abu Abdallah al-Shudhi, an Andalusian scholar popularly known as Sidi al-Halwi.

An enigmatic figure, al-Shudhi is said to have served as a qadi in Seville (now in Spain) during the final years of Almohad rule. He later abandoned his judgeship and left the city for reasons that remain unknown, eventually making his way to Tlemcen. There, according to tradition, he adopted the guise of a wandering dervish or "holy fool," spending time with children and distributing sweets, which earned him the Arabic epithet al-Halwi ("the sweet-maker"). He is also credited with founding the Shudhiyya Sufi order, a school distinguished by its blending of Sufism and philosophy. Al-Shudhi was associated with doctrines of unity, especially what later came to be described as al-Wahda al-Mutlaqa ("Absolute Unity"), a tendency he appears to have initiated and that was later linked, in different ways, to figures such as Ibn Mar’a, Ibn Arabi, and Ibn Sab'in.

While earlier historical texts mention that he simply died in Tlemcen, later oral tradition links him to a legend in which he is said to have been executed on the city sultan’s orders after being falsely accused of sorcery. The same tradition adds that, once the sultan realized his error, he had his grand vizier executed for inciting him against Sidi al-Halwi and then ordered a tomb to be built in his honor. The exact dates of Sidi al-Halwi’s death and the construction of his tomb remain unknown. Although a mausoleum attributed to him stands near the mosque bearing his name, its authenticity has yet to be verified.

== History ==
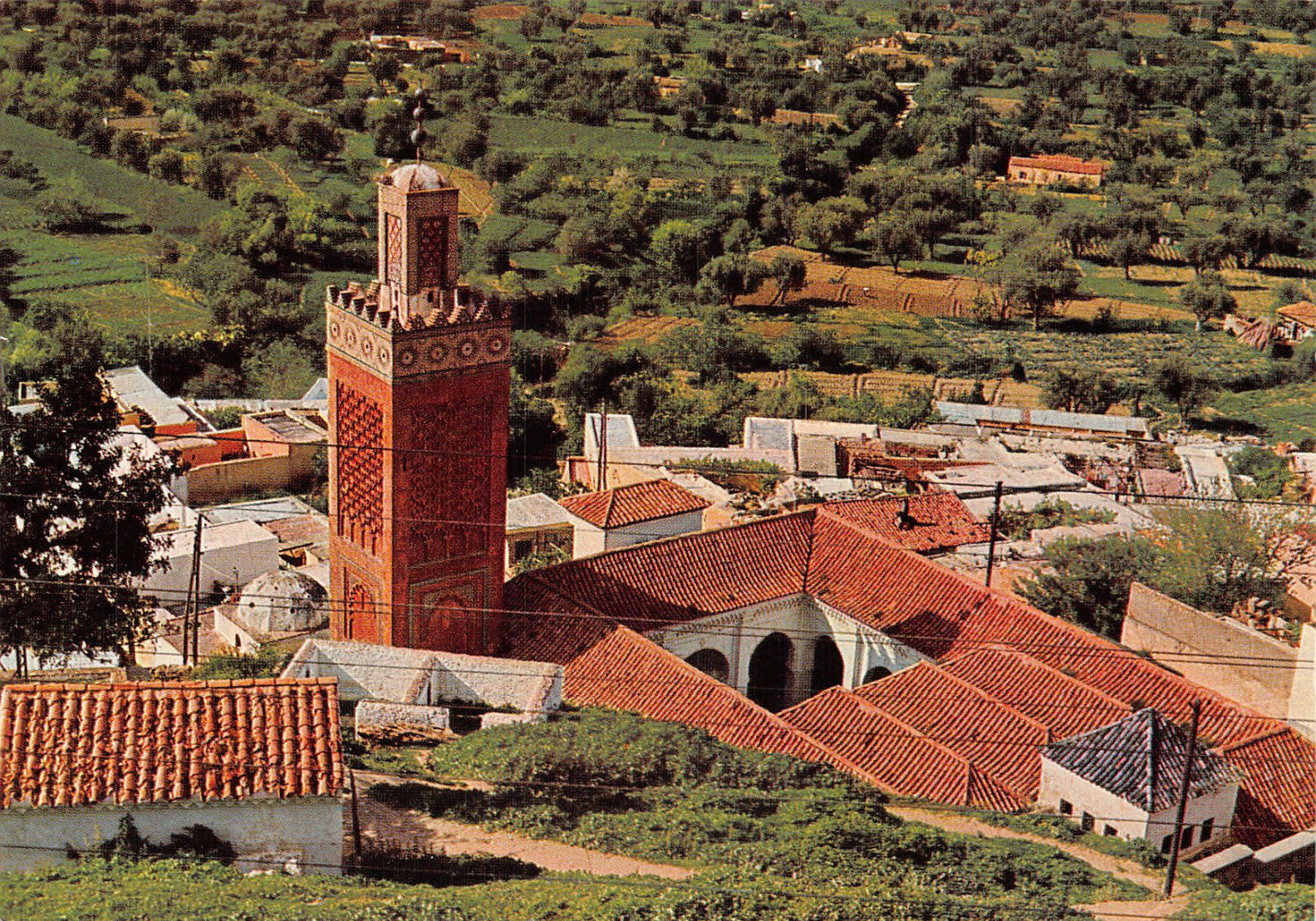
View of the mosque, a surviving remnant of the original complex, alongside the surrounding neighborhood.

The religious complex of Sidi al-Halwi was built to the north of the historic center of Tlemcen, nestled in a valley outside the main city walls. It is accessible from the Bab Ziri district via a steeply sloping path that descends toward the site. The complex was designed to mirror the comprehensive layout of the al-Ubbad sanctuary, which was built adjacent to the mausoleum of Abu Madyan Shu'ayb. Exactly why Abu Inan chose to build the complex around the tomb of Sidi al-Halwi remains a matter of historical debate. Fatima Zahra Amara points to two likely reasons: the site may have already been a highly popular local shrine in Tlemcen, or Abu Inan felt a personal connection to the Shudhiyya Sufi order. Amara supports the latter theory by noting Abu Inan's admiration for the poetry of Ibn al-Khamis al-Tilimsani, a prominent follower of the order.

The foundation of the madrasa is described by Ibrahim al-Numayri (d. 1367), katib diwan al-inshaʾ (secretary of the chancery) to Abu Inan Faris:

Connected to this zawiya on the northern side is a madrasa with many chambers, lofty in elevation and remarkable in its qualities. It contains doors opening onto residences complete in their amenities, well arranged in their layout, assigned to the chief officials responsible for its functions and for providing hospitality to both the traveler and the resident devotee.

— Ibrahim al-Numayri, Fayd al-Abab

Since the madrasa was built adjacent to the tomb of Sidi al-Halwi, the institution became inextricably linked to the saint's name. Although the original spatial arrangement of the sanctuary is difficult to reconstruct today, contemporary accounts confirm the presence of the madrasa within the complex. The Andalusian traveler Ibn al-Sabbah (fl. late 14th century CE), who visited the city, described the Madrasa of Sidi al-Halwi as "a paradise on earth, where sustenance was provided from the lawful endowments (waqf) of the righteous. There were many other madrasas, but we mention this one for the sake of brevity."

Over time, the madrasa was lost, leaving only the adjacent mosque, built c. 1353, and ablutions facility as the primary surviving remnants of the complex. The exact period of the madrasa’s decline remains unknown, though it is suggested to have fallen into ruin during the period of Ottoman rule over the city.

== See also ==
- Tashfiniya Madrasa
- Madrasa of Awlad al-Imam
- Madrasa of al-Hasan ibn Makhluf
