= Madrasa of al-Hasan ibn Makhluf =

15th-century historic madrasa in Tlemcen, Algeria

The Madrasa of al-Hasan ibn Makhluf or Madrassa of Abarkan (Arabic: مدرسة الحسن ابن مخلوف) was a former historic madrasa located in Tlemcen, Algeria. Built during the Abd al-Wadid (Zayyanid) era, the institution was commissioned by Sultan Abu al-Abbas Ahmad al-Aqil (r. c. 1431 – 1461) to honor the prominent Maliki scholar and Sufi ascetic Abu Ali al-Hasan ibn Makhlouf al-Rashidi, commonly known as Abarkan. While historical texts confirm it was a well-funded and active part of Tlemcen's network of madrasas, the exact location and founding date of the institution remain unknown. The building itself no longer exists, and early 20th-century surveys failed to uncover any physical traces of the original site.

== History ==
The madrasa of al-Hasan ibn Makhluf is also referred to as the madrasa of Abarkan, is historically associated with the Maliki scholar and Sufi Abu Ali al-Hasan ibn Makhlouf al-Rashidi (d. 857 AH / c. 1453–1454), commonly known as Abarkan (meaning al-Aswad "the black" in Berber). Born in the village of al-Jam'a on the Oued Isser near Tlemcen, he memorized the Quran in his village before moving to the city to finish his education.

He traveled widely in pursuit of Islamic learning, studying in Béjaïa, Constantine, Tunis, Egypt, and Mecca, where he reportedly resided for five years. His teachers included leading scholars of the era, such as Ibrahim al-Masmoudi, Ibn Marzuq al-Hafid, and Muhammad ibn Ammar al-Huwari. After returning to Tlemcen, Abarkan became a highly respected religious figure. Known for his asceticism and for mediating on behalf of ordinary citizens, he earned the profound reverence of the ruling Abd al-Wadid (Zayyanid) authorities.

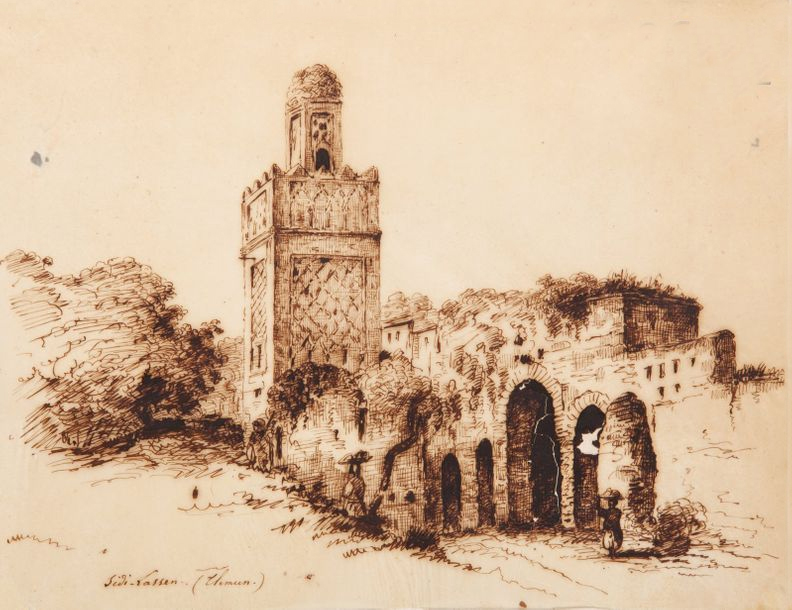
The 19th-century ruins of a mosque in Tlemcen, locally known as Sidi Lhassen, whose name is linked to the scholar.

The Abd al-Wadid Sultan Abu al-Abbas Ahmad known as al-Aqil (r. c. 1431 – 1461) and a grandson of Abu Hammu II, frequently visited the scholar, attended his teaching sessions, and relied heavily on his guidance, often confiding his personal concerns to him. In honor of Abarkan, the sultan commissioned a new madrasa next to the sheikh's zawiya and assigned generous endowments (habous) to support it.

The court historian Muhammad al-Tanasi (d. 1494) recorded the sultan's dedication:

He had profound reverence for the ascetic saint, the Qutb and Ghawth (spiritual pole and succor), the sheikh of ascetics and the exemplar of worshippers, Sidi Abu Ali Al-Hassan ibn Makhlouf. He visited him frequently, sought his guidance, and relied on him for most of his affairs. He built the new madrasa at his zawiya and assigned generous endowments to it. Finding that much of the endowment properties had fallen into ruin and the associated positions had been suspended, he revived their institutions, restored what had decayed, and reinstated the positions with even greater provisions than before.

— Muhammad al-Tanasi

Mahmoud Agha Bouayed notes an ambiguity in al-Tanasi’s use of the Arabic term banna, which can mean either “to build” or “to restore.” He argues that when al-Tanasi refers to al-Madrasa al-Jadida (“the New Madrasa”), it raises the possibility that the author was actually describing the restoration of the Madrasa al-Tashfiniya. Rachid Bourouiba similarly proposed that the reference concerns the Madrasa al-Tashfiniya, which he believed stood next to the zawiya of Abu Ali al-Hasan ibn Makhlouf al-Rashidi (Sidi Lahsen), and that the sultan Abu al-Abbas Ahmad al-Aqil carried out its restoration. Nevertheless, in his biographical dictionary al-Bustan, the scholar Ibn Maryam (d. 1615) refers to the madrasa in several contexts, clearly identifying it as a distinct functioning institution alongside the other madrasas of Tlemcen. Nevertheless In his biographical dictionary al-Bustan, the scholar Ibn Maryam (d. 1615) refers to the madrasa in several contexts, clearly identifying it as a distinct functioning institution alongside the other madrasas of Tlemcen.

Ibn Maryam also notes that despite the sultan's patronage, Abarkan strictly refused to consume any provisions derived from the madrasa's endowments. Toward the end of his life, he reportedly prayed that God would take his soul before he ever benefited from those funds, and he consistently rejected all material gifts offered by the ruling authorities.

The exact location and foundation date of the madrasa remain so far unknown. Due to a lack of surviving historical or archaeological evidence, scholars generally assume the institution was built between 1431 and 1461, during the reign of Sultan Abu al-Abbas Ahmad. Furthermore, when French scholars Georges and William Marçais published Les Monuments arabes de Tlemcen''in 1903, they were unable to identify any traces of the original structure.

== See also ==
- Madrasa Tashfiniya
- Madrasa of Awlad al-Imam
- Madrasa of Minshar al-Jild
