= Mahmoud Agha Bouayed =

Algerian historian, academic, and civil servant

- Arabic: محمود آغا بوعياد
- Born: 1928; Tlemcen, Colonial Algeria
- Died: 27 June 2006 (aged 78); Algiers, Algeria
- Resting place: El Alia Cemetery
- Occupations: Historian; Academic; Civil servant
- Employers: National Library of Algeria; University of Algiers
- Parent: Abdelhamid Bouayed (father)
- Relatives: Si Mohamed (grandfather)

Academic background
- Education: Franco-Muslim Madrasa of Tlemcen; University of al-Qarawiyyin

Mahmoud Agha Bouayed (Arabic: محمود آغا بوعياد; 1928 – 27 June 2006) was an Algerian intellectual, historian, academic, and civil servant. He was a major figure in the preservation and promotion of the cultural and historical heritage of Algeria and served as the first director of the National Library of Algeria following the country's independence in 1962.

== Biography ==
A native of Tlemcen, Bouayed was born in 1928 into a family deeply involved in Algerian nationalism. His grandfather, Si Mohamed, was a teacher trained at the Franco-Arab school in the early 20th century and was the founding president of the Cercle des nationalistes des jeunes Algériens in Tlemcen in 1907. The nationalist leader Messali Hadj, who was a disciple of Si Mohamed, noted his patriotism in his memoirs. Mahmoud's father, Abdelhamid, served as the president of Football Club Tlemcenien in 1917.

In 1942, Bouayed entered the Franco-Muslim madrasa. During this period, he became active in local cultural associations, joining the "Rachidiyya" theatrical troupe. He later pursued higher education at the University of al-Qarawiyyin in Fez. During the Algerian War, Bouayed was a committed militant within the National Liberation Front (FLN). In 1957, he was among the founding contributors to the newspaper El Moudjahid, the central organ of the war. He published numerous articles in its columns.

Throughout his career, Bouayed held various positions in cultural institutions, higher education, and public administration. As the first director of the National Library of Algeria, he oversaw the creation of a nationwide network of libraries and contributed to the collection of oral and written testimonies related to the nationalist movement in collaboration with Mohamed Guenanèche. He also supervised the republication of the Revue africaine encyclopedia.

Bouayed served as a professor of medieval history at the University of Algiers, where his research focused on the history of Algeria and the Maghreb. His academic work included studies on the 15th-century author Al-Tanasi and the 17th-century scholar Ahmed Mohammed al-Maqqari. In his later years, he served as a counselor to the President of Algeria. In this capacity, he organized international symposia on historical figures such as Messali Hadj and Augustine of Hippo while advocating for the establishment of a Maghrebi research and documentation center.

Bouayed died on the evening of 27 June 2006 and was buried the following day at the El Alia Cemetery in Algiers.

== Works ==
His published editions and scholarly works include:

- Nazm al-durr wa-l-'iqyan: An edition of an excerpt regarding the history of the Zayyanid kings of Tlemcen by the 15th-century author Al-Tanasi.
- Al-Musnad al-Sahih al-Hasan: An edition of the manuscript by the historian Ibn Marzuq dedicated to the virtues of the Marinid sultan Abu al-Hasan Ali ibn Uthman.

== See also ==
- Mohamed Bencheneb
- Mubarek al-Mili
