= Madrasa of Minshar al-Jild =

Historic madrasa in Tlemcen, Algeria

The Madrasa of Minshar al-Jild (Arabic: مدرسة منشر الجلد, romanized: Madrasat Minshar al-Jild, lit. 'Madrasa of Leather Spreading') was a former historic madrasa in Tlemcen, Algeria. The madrasa took its name from the Minshar al-Jild quarter, an area historically associated with the city's leather industry. Tlemcen had been known for its leather production since ancient times, and during the Zayyanid period, its tanneries produced large quantities of leather that exceeded local demand. Alongside grains, oils, and wool, leather hides became one of the city's main commercial exports.

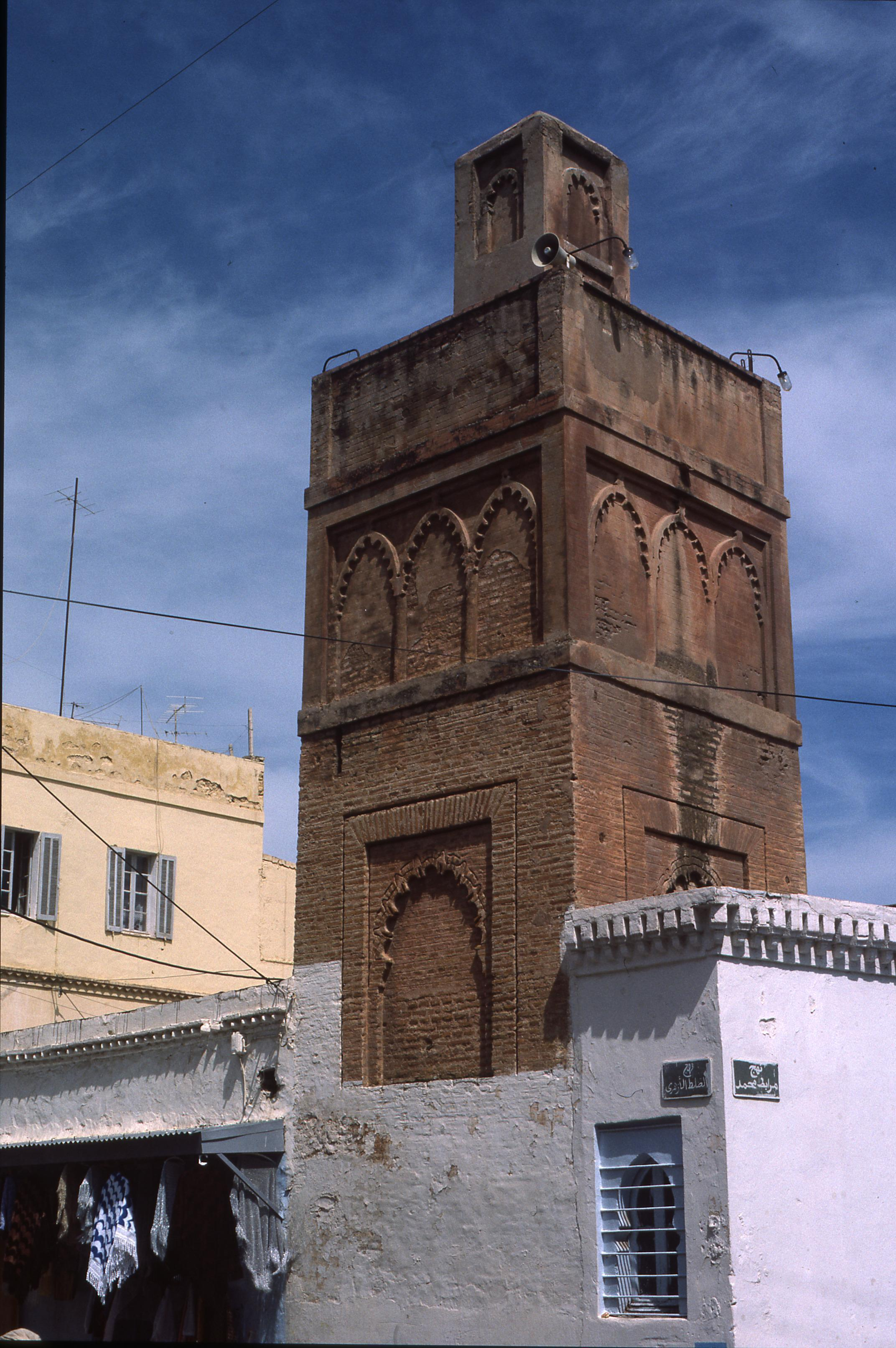
Minaret of the Mosque of Sidi al-Banna, whose surrounding area probably included the Minshar al-Jild quarter, where the madrasa was located. Photograph by André Raymond.

Because of this activity, the souk of the quarter was occupied by several craft guilds. These included the tanners (al-Dabbaghun), who processed raw animal hides; the saddlers (al-Sarrajun), who produced horse saddles often decorated with a type of leather embroidery known as al-majbud; and the cobblers (al-Kharrazun), who were known for producing traditional balghas.

To support a madrasa and a zawiya he founded near the present-day Mosque of Sidi Brahim al-Masmoudi, the Abd al-Wadid Sultan Abu Hammu Musa II (r. c. 1308 – 1318) established a religious endowment in the form of a communal oven (kusha).

The exact date of foundation of the Madrasa of Minshar al-Jild is unknown. its existence is mentioned in the writings of the 17th-century scholar Ibn Maryam. Based on his work al-Bustan, it has been concluded that the madrasa was already active during the lifetime of the scholar Ibn Marzuq al-Hafid (d. 1439), who also served as khatib and imam of the historical mosque located in this quarter.

Although the building itself no longer survives, the historic Minshar al-Jild quarter, which once hosted the madrasa, was located probably in the area surrounding the present-day Sidi al-Banna Mosque.

== See also ==
- Madrasa of Awlad al-Imam
- Tashfiniya Madrasa
- Madrasa of al-Hasan ibn Makhluf
