= Ibn Khamis =

Ibn Khamis most commonly refers to:

- Ibn Khamis al-Yaburi, an 11th-century mystic from Évora.
- Ibn Khamis al-Tilimsani, a 13th-century prominent poet from Tlemcen.
