= Muhammad al-Siti =

Maghrebi scholar from Fez

Abu Abdallah Muhammad Al-Siti
- أبو عبد الله محمد بن علي بن سليمان السِّطِّيّ
- Title: Sheikh, Faqih

Personal life
- Born: Fez
- Died: December 1349 (Shawwal 750 AH) Near Dellys, Algeria
- Cause of death: Shipwreck
- Era: Marinid dynasty
- Region: Maghreb
- Occupation: Faqih (Jurist), Professor, Mufti, Preacher

Religious life
- Religion: Islam
- Denomination: Sunni
- School: Maliki

Muslim leader
- Students: Yahya Ibn Khaldun

Abu Abdallah Muhammad ibn Ali ibn Suleiman Al-Siti (in Arabic : أبو عبد الله محمد بن علي بن سليمان السِّطِّيّ), was a Maghrebi Muslim scholar of the 14th century (8th century Hijri) from Fes. He was a Maliki faqih (muslim jurist), and among his disciples was Yahya Ibn Khaldun, the brother of the historian Ibn Khaldun. Al-Siti enjoyed the respect of the Marinid sultan Abu al-Hasan, who appointed him as a professor at his court. In addition to his teaching role, he served as a mufti and preacher on various occasions.

In 748 AH (1347 AD), Al-Siti stayed in Tunis, where he remained until 750 AH (1349 AD). He was among those who accompanied the Marinid sultan Abu al-Hasan. During his return journey from Ifriqiya, he perished in Shawwal 750 AH (December 1349). His death occurred near Dellys, following the shipwreck of the Marinid fleet, caused by a sea storm.

== Works ==
- Sharh Mukhtasar Al-Hufi [شرح مختصر الحوفي] (in Arabic).
