= Ibn Hadiyya al-Tilimsani =

Maliki jurist and scholar from Tlemcen (c. 1267–1336)

- Born: c. 1267 – c. 1268; Tlemcen
- Died: c. 1335 – c. 1336
- Arabic name
- Personal (Ism): Muhammad محمد
- Patronymic (Nasab): ibn Mansur ibn ʿAli ibn Hadiyya ابن منصور ابن علي ابن هدية
- Teknonymic (Kunya): Abu ʿAbd Allah أبو عبد الله
- Toponymic (Nisba): القرشي النجاري التلمساني al-Qurashi al-Najjari al-Tilmisani

Ibn Hadiyya al-Tilimsani was a Maliki jurist, judge, orator, and writer from Tlemcen. Writings that mention him state that his lineage is traced to Uqba ibn Nafi.

He received his education in Tlemcen, where he later held the position of qadi (judge). He also served as a scribe and advisor to the early rulers of the Zayyanid dynasty, including Abu Zayyan I, under whom he held an administrative role. Additionally, he relocated with his father to Marinid Fez to settle for reasons he preferred not to disclose. Upon his death, Sultan Abu Tashfin I is reported to have attended his funeral. Most of Ibn Hadiyya's works are lost.

== See also ==
- Ibn Khamis
