= Nāzila =

In Islamic jurisprudence, nawāzil (Arabic: نَوَازِل) are collections of historical legal judgements (known individually by the singular form nāzila, Arabic: نَازِلَة). Such collections underpin the practice of fiqh al-nawāzil ("jurisprudence of incidents"), which deals with the normative judgment of specific incidents. In the words of the second edition of the Encyclopaedia of Islam, a nawāzil-collection "furnishes a body of jurisprudential doctrine close to practical and daily life and adopted to the human, social and economic realities of a local character, in such a way that, by means of this expedient, fiḳh [...] is able to evolve".

== Etymology ==
Nāzila is in origin the active participle of the verb nazala "to go down", used substantively as a noun, which in legal usage means "specific case, case in question". The plural form nawāzil is part of the title of several works dedicated to collecting records of such cases.

The term nāzila was used with varying degrees of precision, and is sometimes found used as a synonym of the Arabic legal terms fatāwī/fatāwā, aḥkām, ajwiba and ʿamal.

== History ==
Nawāzil-collections were compiled either by individual experts or by groups of jurists practicing in maḥkamas, gathering material from earlier collections and/or their own legal practice; their primary audience were qāḍīs, who made practical reference to their precedents, but the texts might also be consumed by a wider reading public. They are particularly associated with the Mālikī school of Islamic jurisprudence in the Maghrib, due to Mālik ibn Anas's commitment to referring to real cases rather than theorising. Accordingly, nawāzil differ from fatāwā insofar as they do not report theoretical juridical consultations but rather historical cases and their handling by named jurists. Fiqh al-nawāzil went on to influence the late twenty-first-century emergence of Fiqh al-aqallīyāt.

== Major examples ==
The many nawāzil collections include:

- Saḥnūn (d. 240-41/854, Mudawwana ('a work which forms the basic core of the fundamental doctrine of Mag̲h̲ribī Mālikism')
- Muḥammad ibn Saḥnūn (d. 256/870), Nawāzil al-ṣalāt min Dīwān Muḥammad ibn Saḥnūn
- al-Khalīl ibn Isḥāq (d. 776/1374), Mukhtaṣar
- Ibn/Wuld al-Aʿmash (Mauretania, d. 1107/1695-6)
- al-Gasrī (Mauretania, 13th/19th century)
- Abū al-Layth al-Samarqandī (d. 373/983), Kitāb al-Nawāzil fi al-furūʿ, Mukhtaṣar
- al-Burzulī (d. 841/1438), Jāmiʿ al-masāʾil al-aḥkām li-mā nazala min al-qaḍāyā bi al-muftīn wa al-ḥukamāʾ
- al-Wansharīsī (d. 914/1508) Kitāb al-Miʿyār al-Muʿrib wa Al-jāmiʿ al-mughrib ʿan fatāwī ʿulamāʾ Ifrīqiyā wa al-Andalus wa al-Maghrib [The Clear Measure and the extraordinary Collection of the Judicial Opinions of the Scholars of Ifrīqiyā, al-Andalus, and the Maghrib]; al-muʿrib ʿammā taḍammanahu fatāwī ʿulamāʾ Ifrīḳiya wa al-Andalus wa al-Maghrib
- al-Mahdī al-Wazzānī (fl. second half of the nineteenth century, Morocco), al-Miʿyār al-jadīd

== Editions and studies ==
- J. Berque, Nawazil al-muzāʿara (Rabat 1940).
