= Ibn Khamis al-Tilimsani =

Poet and scholar from Tlemcen

- Born: c. 1246 – c. 1252; Tlemcen
- Died: 1309; Granada
- Arabic name
- Personal (Ism): Muhammad محمد
- Patronymic (Nasab): ibn Umar ابن عمر
- Teknonymic (Kunya): Abu ʿAbd Allah أبو عبد الله
- Toponymic (Nisba): الحجري الرُعيني الحِمْيَري التلمساني. al-Hajri al-Ruʿayni al-Himyari al-Tilmasani

Ibn Khamis (c. 1246-1309) was a 13th-century prominent poet, scholar. He was born in Zayyanid Tlemcen and claimed a Yemeni Himyarite descent. He was raised in a modest family. He was killed in Nasrid Granada.

== See also ==
- Ibn Hadiyya al-Tilmisani
