= Muhammad al-Sharif al-Tilimsani =

Polymath from Tlemcen

- Born: 1310; Tlemcen
- Died: 1370 (aged 59–60)
- Arabic name
- Personal (Ism): Muhammad محمد
- Patronymic (Nasab): ibn Ahmed ibn Ali ابن أحمد ابن علي
- Teknonymic (Kunya): Abu Abdallah أبو عبد الله
- Toponymic (Nisba): al-Tilimsani التلمساني

Muhammad al-Sharif al-Tilimsani (1310 to 1370) was an Islamic scholar from Tlemcen. He was a prominent intellectual figure during the era of the Zayyanid and Marinid dynasties. As a polymath, he was recognized for his expertise in Maliki jurisprudence, theology (kalām), logic, and Arabic linguistics.

== Early life and education ==
Muhammad al-Sharif al-Tilimsani was born in 1310 in the Tlemcen (in present-day Algeria). He was originally from a village known as al-Ulwiyyin (also referred to as al-Ulawiyyin), he received the initial stages of his education in the city.

== Works ==
- Miftah al-wusul ila bina al-furu ala al-usul (also cited under closely related titles, such as Kitab al-Miftah fi usul al-fiqh or "Mukhtasar fi al-usul); this is his primary work on usul al-fiqh and was dedicated to the Marinid sultan Abu Inan Faris.
- Sharh Jumal al-Khunaji ; a commentary on the logical text al-Jumal by al-Khunaji, focusing on logic and mantiq.
- Kitab fi al-muatat / al-muawadat; a scholarly work concerning transactions and exchanges.
- Risala fi al-qada wa-l-qadar; a treatise addressing the topics of divine decree and predestination.
- Qasaid for the Mawlid ; a collection of poems composed specifically for the Mawlid celebrations.
- Fatawa; various legal opinions that have been transmitted through later compilations, including the collections of al-Wansharisi.

== See also ==
- Muhammad al-Abili
- Muhammad al-Maqqari
