= Muhammad al-Tanasi =

Maghrebi Scholar active in Tlemcen

- Born: possibly Ténès, in present-day Algeria
- Died: February/March 1494 (Jumada al-Ula 899 AH)
- Arabic name
- Personal (Ism): Muhammad محمد
- Patronymic (Nasab): Ibn Abdallah ibn Abd al-Jalil ابن عبد االله بن عبد الجليل
- Toponymic (Nisba): al-Tanasi al-Tilimsani التنسي التلمساني

Muhammad al-Tanasi (Arabic: محمد التنسي; born c. early 15th century – died 1494) commonly known as al-Hafid al-Tanasi, was a prominent Maghrebi jurist, historian, poet, and man of letters. Possibly born in Ténès, he spent the majority of his career in Tlemcen, where he became one of the city's most distinguished scholars. He is best known for his historical work, Nazm al-Durr wa al-'Iqyan, a significant source on the Zayyanid dynasty of Tlemcen and its rulers.

== Biography ==
His full name was Muhammad ibn Abd Allah ibn Abd al-Jalil al-Tanasi, commonly known as al-Hafid al-Tanasi. Little is known about his early life, and the date of his birth remains uncertain. He is generally thought to have originated from Ténès (now in Algeria), from which his nisba al-Tanasi derives, though he spent much, perhaps most of his life in Tlemcen, which explains why the toponymic nisba al-Tilimsani was also applied to him.

Al-Maqqari refers to him as “Muhammad ibn Abd Allah ibn Abd al-Jalil al-Tanasi, then al-Tilimsani,” and elsewhere describes him as a resident of Tlemcen, indicating that he was not originally from the city but settled there later. A manuscript copied in his own hand at the end of the 8 volume of Ibn Hajar al-Asqalani's Fath al-Bari identifies him as “Muhammad ibn Abd Allah ibn Abd al-Jalil al-Amawi, then al-Tanasi.” This suggest an Umayyad affiliation.

== Selected works ==
- Al-Tiraz fi sharh dabt al-Kharraz, a commentary on al-Kharraz's treatise on Qur'anic orthography
- Nazm al-durar wa-l-'iqyan fi bayan sharaf Bani Zayyan, a chronicle of the Zayyanids of Tlemcen
- Rah al-arwah fima qalahu Abu Hammu wa-ma qila fihi min al-amdah, a literary compilation centered on Abu Hammu II (lost)
- Jawab mutawwal fi mas'alat Yahud Tuwat, a legal responsum on the Jews of Tuat
- Fahrasa

== See also ==
- Yahya ibn Khaldun
- Ibn Marzuq
