= Yahya ibn Khaldun =

- يحيى بن خلدون
- Born: c. 1333; Tunis, Hafsid Sultanate (modern-day Tunisia)
- Died: 1378 (during Ramadan); Tlemcen, Zayyanid Sultanate (modern-day Algeria)
- Education: Studied under al-Abili
- Occupations: Historian, Secretary
- Notable work: Bughiyat al-Ruwad fi dhikr al-Muluk min Bani Abd al-Wed
- Relatives: Abd al-Rahman ibn Khaldun (brother)

Abu Zakariyya Yahya ibn Khaldun (Arabic: أبو زكريا يحيى بن خلدون, romanized: Abū Zakariyyāʾ Yaḥyā ibn Khaldūn; c. 1333 – 1378/9) was a North African Muslim historian. He was a younger brother of the more famous scholar Abd al-Rahman ibn Khaldun.

Ibn Khaldun was born in Tunis, then the capital of the Hafsids, to an intellectually prominent family of Andalusi origin. The main source for his life is elder brother's autobiography.

Ibn Khaldun studied under al-Abili, whose opposition to the monopolization of education by the state he shared. He shared an interest in history with his brother, but also an interest in adab (belles lettres). By 1356, he had followed his brother to the Marinid capital of Fes, where he participated in court intrigues. He lived for a time in Béjaïa and after 1362 settled in Tlemcen in the employ of King Abu Hammu II, for whom he wrote poetic panegyrics.

In 1364, the Hafsid emir Abu al-Abbas Ahmad II seized control of Béjaïa. Ibn Khaldun was captured and his property confiscated. He escaped and fled to Biskra, capital of the Zab Emirate. During this period, he went on a pilgrimage to the tomb of Uqba ibn Nafi. He returning to Tlemcen to serve as Abu Hammu's secretary (katib al-insha) in 1367 or 1368. In 1370, he defected to the Marinids, but returned to the court of Abu Hammu II in 1373 or 1374. His disloyalty led to his murder at the instigation of Abu Hammu's son and heir, Abu Tashfin II. His death took place during Ramadan in December 1378–January 1379.

Ibn Khaldun's major work is the Bughyat al-ruwad fi dhikr muluk min Bani Abd al-Wad, a history of the Zayyanid dynasty down to 1376, dedicated to Abu Hammu II. Where his brother presents the Zayyanids as Berbers, Yahya gives them an illustrious Alid genealogy. The Bughyat is one of the most important sources, and often the only source, for 14th-century North African history. It is superior in literary merit to the more ambitious writings of his brother. It also preserves copies of several poems.

== See also ==
- Muhammad al-Tanasi
- Zahr al-Bustan fi Dawlat Bani Ziyan
- Wasitat al-suluk fi siyasat al-muluk
