= Awlad al-Imam Mosque =

Mosque in Tlemcen, Algeria

- مسجد أولاد الإمام
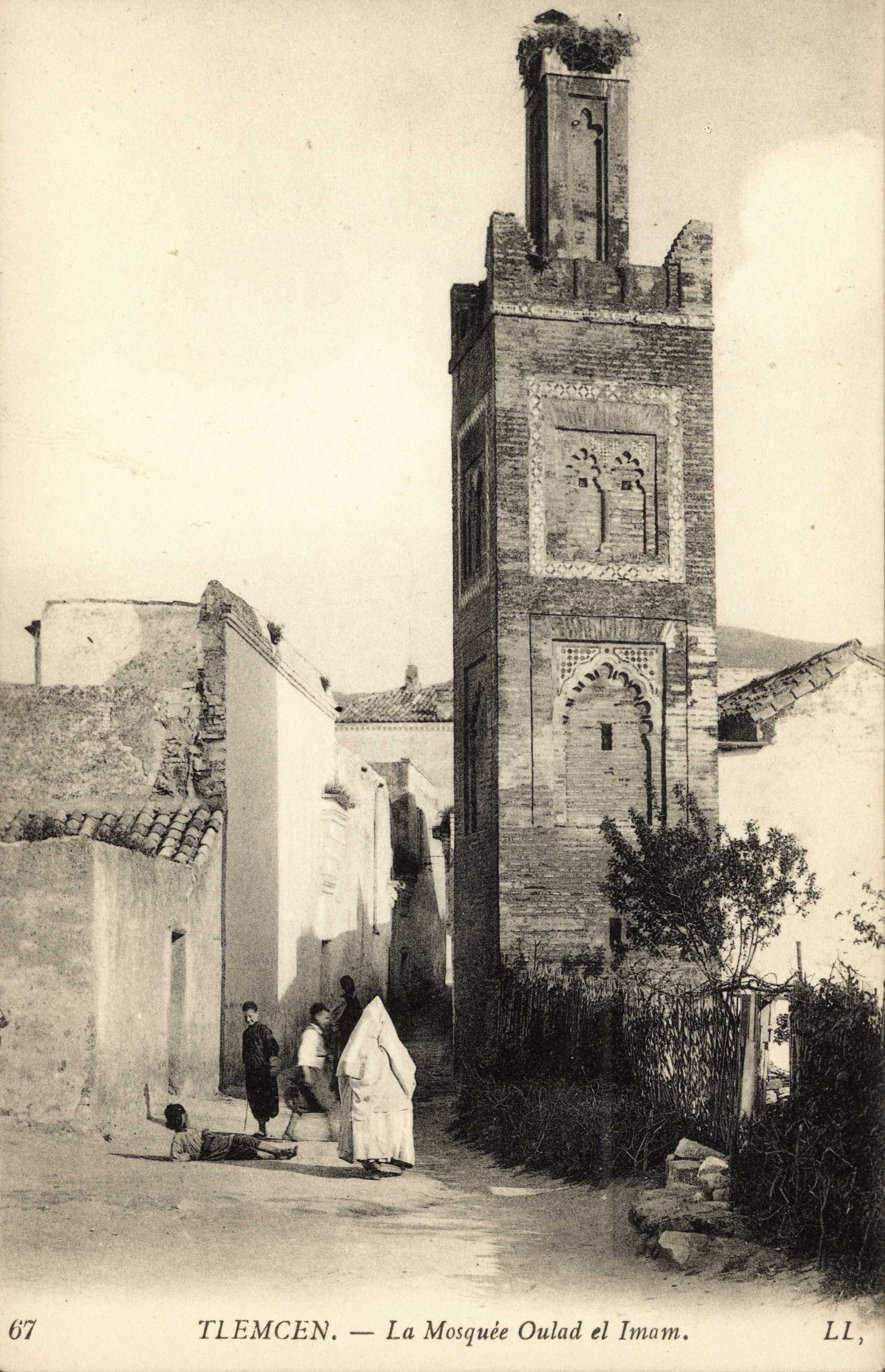

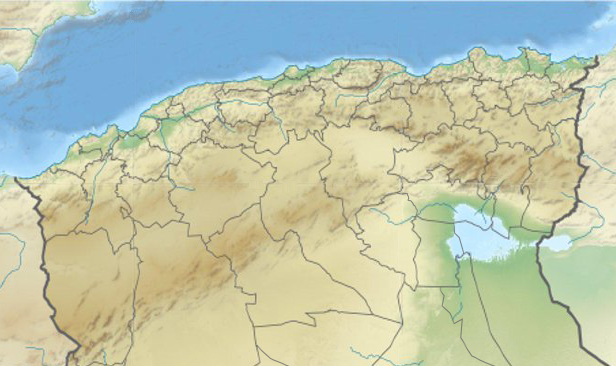
- Location of the mosque in northern Algeria

Religion
- Affiliation: Islam
- Ecclesiastical or organisational status: Mosque
- Year consecrated: 1310
- Status: Active

Location
- Location: Tlemcen
- Country: Algeria
- Interactive map of Awlad al-Imam Mosque
- Coordinates: 34.88125°N 1.31327°W

Architecture
- Type: Islamic architecture
- Founder: Abu Hammu Musa I
- Minaret: 1

The Awlad al-Imam Mosque (Arabic: مسجد أولاد الإمام) is a historic mosque located in the city of Tlemcen, Algeria. It was commissioned by Abu Hammu Musa I in 1310 CE, and it was part of a larger architectural complex.

== Background ==
Abu Hammu Musa I (r. c. 1308 – 1318 CE) was the fourth ruler of the Abd al-Wadid (also known as the Zayyanid) dynasty. His reign focused on repairing Tlemcen following the long Marinid siege and recovering the tribal territories that had escaped the authority of his dynasty. Described by Ibn Khaldun as a sharp and imposing leader, he pioneered the transition from nomadic customs to formal courtly protocol and administrative systems. A sagacious ruler, he was a dedicated patron of literature and science who sought the company of distinguished intellectuals.

Among the most prominent scholars associated with his reign were the two brothers known as Awlad al-Imam (“Sons of the Imam”): Abu Zayd Abd al-Rahman and Abu Musa Isa. Originating from Breshk (now in ruins), near present-day Ténès in Algeria, they belonged to a respected family of religious scholars. After the assassination of their father, they pursued advanced studies in Tunis. They later moved from Tunis to Bershk, to the Mashreq then to al-Jazair (modern-day Algiers), and subsequently to Miliana, where they established themselves as influential teachers. As their scholarly reputation expanded throughout the Maghrib, reports of their distinction reached Abu Hammu Musa I even before his accession to power.

Upon ascending the throne, the sultan invited the two brothers to Tlemcen, drew them into his inner circle, and accorded them distinguished status at court. In recognition of their learning and to institutionalize religious instruction in the capital, he commissioned the construction of a madrasa adjacent to a mosque specifically along with houses for them. This religious complex became associated with their name, Awlad al-Imam, and developed into an important center of teaching in the Maghrib.
