= Breshk =

Former city in Algeria

Breshk برشك Barashk, Brischan
- Flag

- Location in Algeria
- Coordinates: 36.567426°N 1.904926°E
- Country: Algeria
- Wilaya: Tipaza
- Commune: Gouraya

Breshk (also known as Barashk or Brischan) was a significant former port city located on the central coast of Algeria. It was built on the site of the ancient Punic and Roman city of Gunugus. The site is situated near the modern town of Gouraya in the Tipaza Province.

The city was a vital maritime link, particularly under the Zayyanid dynast. It was eventually destroyed in the early 17th century and its remains now merge with the ruins of the earlier Roman colony.

== Etymology ==
The name appears in various forms in medieval Arabic sources, including Barashk, Bresk, Birchik, and Brescar. Modern scholarship suggests the name is of Phoenician origin.

Arabic sources propose a folk etymology composed of the syllables Ber (shore) and chek (doubt), implying a "dangerous or uncertain shore". This likely refers to the city's limited natural fortifications and its exposed maritime position. The ancient name Gunugu is thought to be of Berber origin, derived from agni (hill or coast), which was later Punicized.

== See also ==
- Awlad al-Imam

== Bibliography ==
- Agabi, C. (1992). "Breshk/Barashk". Encyclopédie berbère.
- Haddadou, Mohand-Akli (2012). Dictionnaire toponymique et historique de l'Algérie.
- Vanz, Jennifer (2021). L’invention d’une capitale : Tlemcen.
