= Ahmad al-Wansharisi =

Algerian scholar and jurist (died 1508)

Ahmad ibn Yahya al-Wansharisi

Personal life
- Born: 1430 or 1431 Ouarsenis mountains (in Algeria)
- Died: June 20, 1508 Fez (in today Morocco)
- Resting place: Kudyat al-Baraṭil cemetery, Fez
- Region: Maghreb North Africa; Spain
- Main interest(s): Muslims under non-Muslim rule; Notarization of legal document
- Notable work(s): The Clear Standard; The Supreme Method and the Pure Source on the Rules of Notarization; The Most Noble Commerce
- Occupation: Islamic theologian and jurist

Religious life
- Religion: Islam
- Jurisprudence: Maliki
- Creed: Ash'ari

Part of The Supreme Method and the Pure Source on the Rules of Notarization by al-Wansharisi.

Ahmad ibn Yahya al-Wansharisi (Arabic: أحمد بن يحيى الونشريسي, full name: Abu ’l-ʿAbbās Aḥmad ibn Yaḥyā ibn Muḥammad ibn ʿAbd al-Wāḥid ibn ʿAlī al-Wansharīsī or simply known as al-Wansharisi, b. 1430 or 1431 in Ouarsenis, d. 1508 in Fez) was a Berber Muslim theologian and jurist of the Maliki school around the time of the fall of Granada. He was one of the leading authorities on the issues of Iberian Muslims living under Christian rule.

== Biography ==
He was born in the Ouarsenis mountains (Arabic: الونشريس, Al-Wansharis) in present-day Algeria, in a family belonging to one of the Berber tribes in these mountains. His family moved to Tlemcen when he was a child. In Tlemcen, he studied and later taught Islamic law. After spending more than forty years in Tlemcen, he moved to Fez, present-day Morocco. to teach Islamic law. He became official mufti in Fez and became the leading living authority on the issues of Iberian Muslims living under Christian rule, after the Christian conquest (termed reconquista) of Islamic Al-Andalus. He died on the Tuesday, 20 June 1508. He was buried in Fez, in the Kudyat al-Baraṭil cemetery, near the tomb of ibn Abbad.

== Works ==
His most notable work is al-Mi`yār al-Mughrib ("The Clear Measure and the extraordinary Collection of the Judicial Opinions of the Scholars of Ifrīqiyā, al-Andalus, and the Maghrib"), a multivolume collection of legal opinions (fatwas) and cases (nawāzil) in North Africa and Islamic Spain. By the sixteenth century it became part of the educational curriculum in North Africa, and in modern times it is studied as a source of information on the religious and social practices of contemporary Islamic Spain and the Maghreb North Africa.

Another work, Al-Manhaj al-Faaiq wa al-Manhal al-Raaiq fi Ahkam al-Wathaaiq ("The Supreme Method and the Pure Source on the Rules of Notarization") consists of 16 chapters about notarization of Islamic legal documents. It includes the requirements and desired characters of a notary public, standards and requirements of an Islamic legal document, as well as notarial topics such as how to correctly date a legal document.

In total, at least 15 of al-Wansharisi's works are extant, almost all in the topic of fiqh (Islamic jurisprudence).

=== On Muslims in Spain ===
He also wrote Asna al-matajir fi bayan ahkam man ghalaba 'ala watanihi al-nasara wa lam yuhajir wa ma yatarattabu 'alayhi min al-'uqubat wa al-zawajir ("The Most Noble Commerce, Setting Forth the Legal Rulings Regarding One Whose Lands Have been Conquered by the Christians and Stern Threats That Apply to Him as a Consequence", shortened Asna al-matajir or "The Most Noble Commerce"), an extensive fatwa arguing that it was compulsory for Muslims in Christian-conquered Spain to emigrate to Muslim lands. It was issued in 1491, shortly before the fall of Granada which marks the end of the reconquista. At this point, most of Spain excepting Granada were had been conquered by the Christians, and Muslims had already lived in these territories under Christian rule (such Muslims are also known as mudéjars). In addition to citing the Qur'an, hadith and previous consensus of jurists, he also supported his case with a detailed demonstration of why the mudéjars were unable to properly fulfill a Muslim's ritual obligation.

This fatwa is one of the most preeminent pre-modern legal opinions on Muslims living under non-Muslim rule, although it was issued in the context of Muslims in Iberia and North Africa. In addition to The Most Noble Commerce, he also wrote a shorter companion fatwa, sometimes called the "Marbella fatwa", responding to a question about a man from Marbella in Southern Spain who wished to stay in Christian Spain in order to assist those unable to migrate. These two fatwas were distributed as independent work, and are later included in his collection The Clear Standard.

Al-Wansharisi's position, which emphasised the obligation to emigrate, was the predominant position of the Maliki school at the time. The Oran fatwa, issued in 1504 after the forced conversion in the Crown of Castile, was an exception to this majority opinion, arguing that it may be permissible for Spanish Muslims to stay and even outwardly conform to Christianity, when forced and necessary for survival.

== See also ==
- Ahmad ibn Abi Jum'ah
- Islam in Spain
  - Mudéjar
  - Morisco
- Oran fatwa
