= Ibn Marzuq al-Khatib =

Muslim scholar

Personal life
- Born: c. 1310 Tlemcen, (modern-day Algeria)
- Died: 1379 Cairo, (modern-day Egypt)
- Era: 14th century
- Main interest(s): Islamic jurisprudence, History
- Notable idea(s): Diplomatic negotiations with rulers in Algeria and Spain
- Known for: Advisor to Marinid Sultan Abu al-Hasan Ali ibn Othman, author of hagiographical history of Abu al-Hasan
- Occupation: Scholar, Preacher, Diplomat

Religious life
- Religion: Islam
- Creed: Maliki

Ibn Marzuq (full name: Shams al-Din Abu ʿAbd Allah Muhammad ibn Ahmad ibn Muhammad ibn Muhammad ibn Abi Bakr al-ʿAjisi al-Tilimsani, also known as al-Khatib (the Preacher) or al-Jadd (the Grandfather) or al-Rais (the Leader); c. 1310–1379) was a prominent 14th-century faqīh from Tlemcen (modern Algeria).

== Biography ==
He was born around 1310 in Tlemcen and travelled in his late teens to the orient, where he studied with a group of around 250 scholars for fifteen years. He returned to the Maghreb as a faqih, or expert in Islamic law. The Marinid sultan, Abu al-Hasan Ali ibn Othman, appointed Ibn Marzuq to the position of preacher at the al-ʿUbbad mosque in his native Tlemcen.

Ibn Marzuq subsequently became the sultan's advisor, teacher and secretary and was given an important diplomatic role, negotiating with rulers in Algeria and Spain, where he concluded a peace treaty with the King of Castile, Alphonse XI. On the death of Abu al-Hasan, he returned to Tlemcen, where he engaged in intrigue against the new Marinid sultan Abu Inan Faris, before fleeing to Spain, where he was offered the position of khatib (sermon-giver) at the great mosque al-Hamra in Granada.

He was recalled to Fez, where he held a high position until the disastrous failure of a diplomatic mission to Spain led to him being imprisoned for six years. Soon after his release in 1358, he moved to Tunis, where he was offered a high position by Abu Salim Ibrahim. He remained there until 1372, when he retired to Cairo for the last seven years of his life to serve as Grand Qadi.

== Works ==
Ibn Marzuq is known for his works of legal, religious and historical scholarship. Among his most notable is his 1371 hagiographical history of the Marinid sultan Abu al-Hasan. The book emphasizes Ibn Marzuq's own role in al-Hasan's reign; he evidently sought to burnish his own achievements for his self-aggrandizement. Titled The Correct and Fine Traditions About the Glorious Deeds of our Master Abu 'l-Hasan (Musnad as-sahid al-hasan fi maʿathir mawlana Abi 'l Hasan), the book discusses the qualities of the sultan, his court, and the works undertaken during his reign. A Spanish translation was published in 1977 by the Instituto Hispano-Arabe de Cultura, as El Musnad: Hechos memorables de Abu l-Hasan, sultan de los benimerines.

He also wrote a kitâb al-imâma, a definition of the Islamic caliphate and discussion of political and governmental principles, as well as an extremely voluminous fahrasa (list of teachers) which, unusually, includes a number of learned women.

His work Miftah al-Wusul was recently translated into English by Professor Mohammad S. Alrahawan and was published in 2020 by Peter Lang/ International Academic Publishers.
