= Muhammad al-Abili =

Philosopher and scholar from Tlemcen (1282–1356)

- Born: 1282; Tlemcen
- Died: 1356 (aged 73–74); Fez

Muhammad al-Abili (/ˈɛlˈʔæːbliː/, Arabic: أبو عبد الله محمد بن إبراهيم بن أحمد العبدري التلمساني الأبلي, Abū ʿAbd Allāh al-Ābilī; 1282–1356, 681–757 AH) was a Muslim philosopher from Tlemcen. He is perhaps best known today as a teacher and important influence of Ibn Khaldun, who studied philosophy under him for three years in Tunis.

== Biography ==
He was born in Tlemcen, in present-day Algeria in 1282. His father Ibrahim, originally from Ávila in Al-Andalus, was a soldier in the army of Bani Zayyan. His mother was the daughter of Qadi Muhammad ibn Ghalbun in Tlemcen.

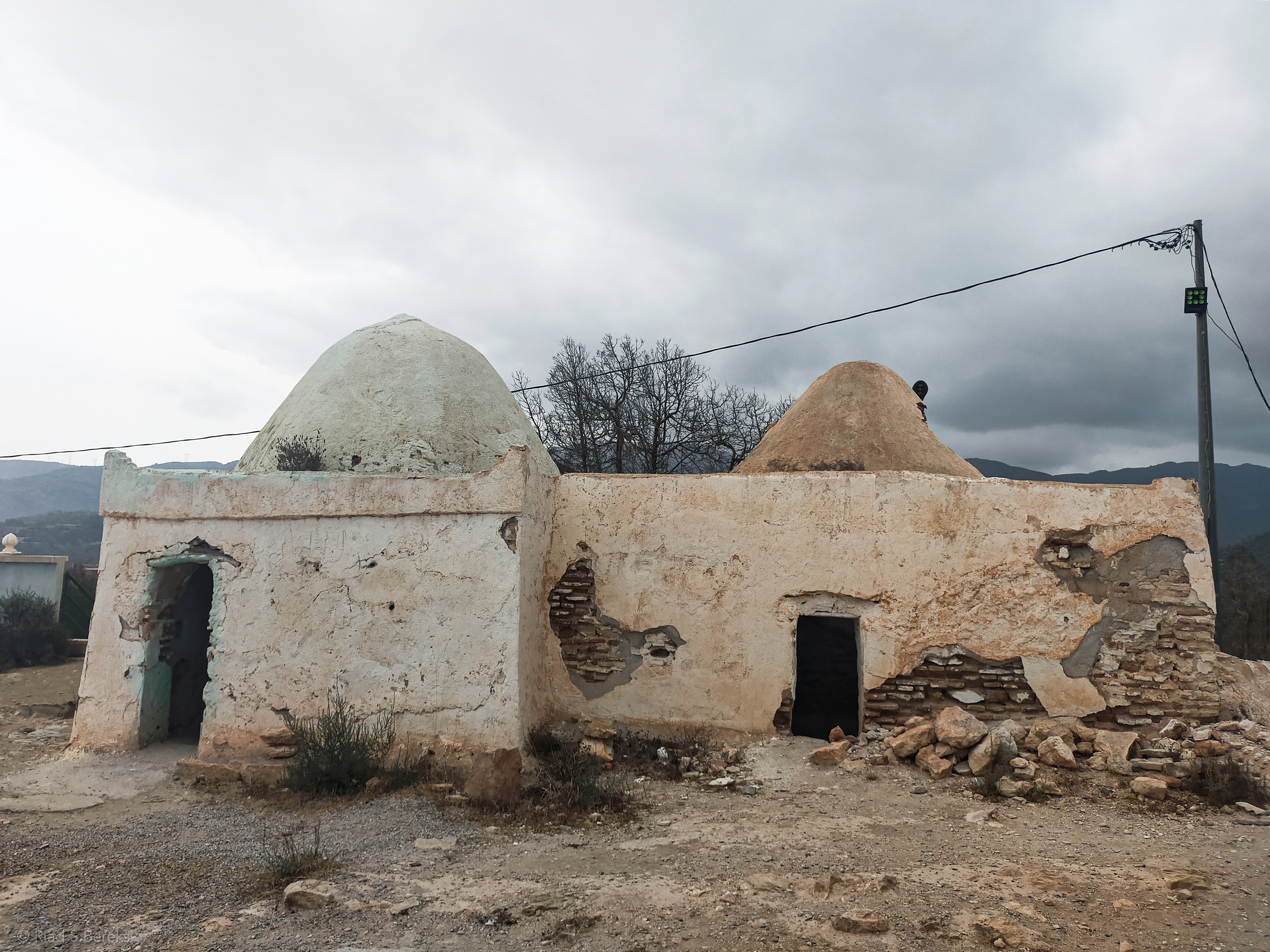
Mausoleum of Sidi Ibrahim in Honaine, Tlemcen Province, presumed to be the tomb of Ibrahim (father of Muhammad al-Abili)

When the Marinids occupied Tlemcen, he left the city. He travelled east in the company of a Shi'ite heterodox teacher, eventually making the pilgrimage to Mecca and spending time in Karbala. He returned to Tlemcen after the city was liberated and devoted himself to study. He studied logic and 'Usoul under Ibn Al-Imam (Abi Mausa). At the prospect of being forced into an administrative role with the city treasury, Al-Abili fled westward to Fez, in present-day Morocco. He initially took refuge with a Jewish mathematician and was able to further his knowledge of mathematics under his tutelage. Around 710 AH, he settled in Marrakesh, where he studied philosophy under the great scholar Ibn al-Banna'. After Ibn al-Banna''s death, Al-Abili taught in Fez and became famous, eventually joining the court of Sultan Abu al-Hassan.

Al-Abili came to Tunis with the Sultan when he conquered Ifriqiya in 748 H, and it was there that he tutored Ibn Khaldun. He died in Fez in 757 AH, 1356 AD.

== See also ==
- Yahya ibn Khaldun
