= Muhammad Ibn Maryam =

Scholar from Tlemcen

Muhammad ibn Maryam
- Born: Tlemcen
- Died: 1615; Tlemcen
- Burial place: Tlemcen
- Arabic name
- Personal (Ism): Muhammad محمد
- Patronymic (Nasab): ibn Maryam ابن مريم
- Teknonymic (Kunya): Abu Abdallah أبو عبد الله
- Toponymic (Nisba): الشريف المديوني التلمساني al-Sharif al-Madyuni al-Tilimsani

Abu Abdullah Muhammad ibn Muhammad ibn Maryam al-Sharif al-Tilimsani (Arabic: أبو عبد الله محمد بن محمد بن مريم الشريف التلمساني; died c. 1615 CE, commonly known as Ibn Maryam, was an Islamic scholar, historian, and hagiographer from Tlemcen (present-day Algeria).

He is best known as the author of the biographical dictionary Al-Bustan fi dhikr al-awliya wa al-ulama bi-Tilimsan. This work is considered the definitive primary source for the intellectual and religious history of the Maghreb, particularly regarding the scholars and Sufis of Tlemcen. Living during the transitional period between the Zayyanid decline and the establishment of Ottoman rule, Ibn Maryam's writings preserved the biographies of hundreds of scholars of the city.
