= Tashfiniya Madrasa =

Historic madrasa in Tlemcen, Algeria

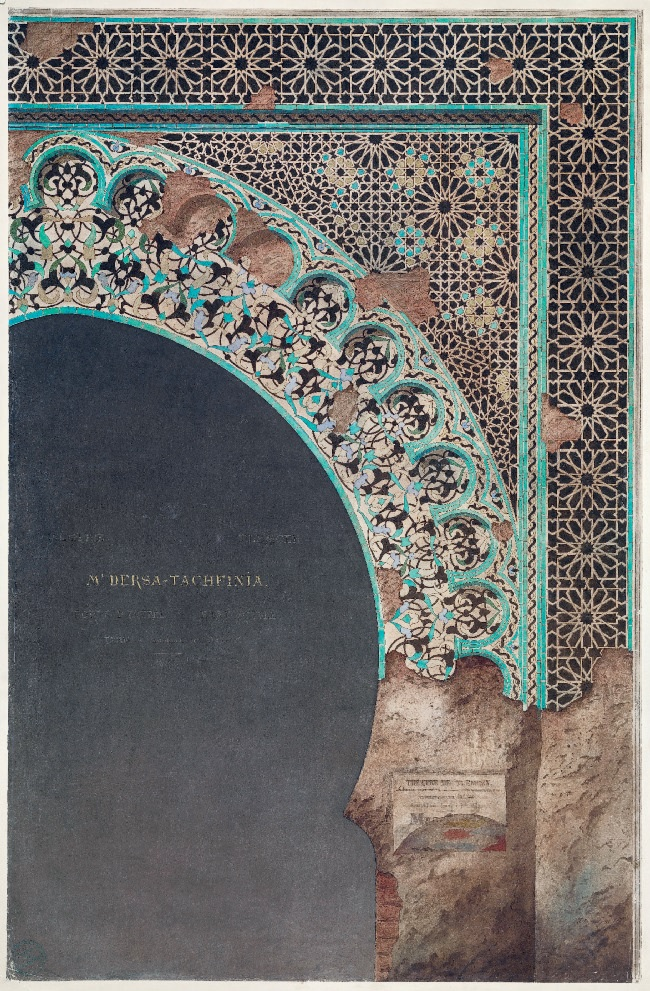
Watercolor drawing of the zellij decoration on the madrasa's entrance portal (drawn by Édouard Danjoy in 1873)

The Tashfiniya Madrasa (Arabic: المدرسة التاشفينية, romanized: al-Madrasa at-Tāshfiniyya), (Note: It is also transliterated as Tachfinia or Tachfiniya in French) is a former madrasa in the city of Tlemcen, Algeria. Built in the early 14th century by the Zayyanid ruler Abu Tashfin I (r. 1318–1337), it was a major monument in the city and was celebrated for its rich architectural decoration. It was demolished by the French colonial authorities in 1876.

== History ==
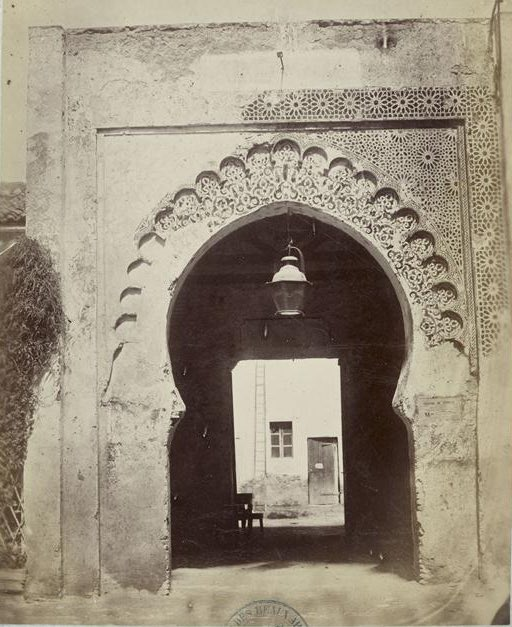
Photograph of the madrasa's entrance in the 19th century, before its demolition

The Zayyanid (or Abd al-Wadid) dynasty were the first rulers to sponsor the construction of madrasas in the territory controlled by their state in the central Maghreb (roughly present-day Algeria), just as their contemporary neighbouring dynasties, the Hafsids and the Marinids, introduced the first madrasas to the eastern and western Maghreb, respectively. The first madrasa in Tlemcen, the Oulad el-Imam Madrasa (also called al-Madrasa al-Qadima or "Old Madrasa"), was founded by the Zayyanid sultan Abu Hammu I in 1310, though it has not been preserved to the present day. (Note: Its accompanying mosque, the Oulad el-Imam Mosque, is still extant, but without most of its original decoration.)

The Tashfiniya Madrasa, the second madrasa in Tlemcen, was founded by Abu Hammu's son and successor, Abu Tashfin I, during his reign between 1318 and 1337. It was also known as al-Madrasa al-Jadida or "New Madrasa". Abu Tashfin had arranged for the overthrow and assassination of his father, and the creation of a religious foundation may have been intended as a pious act to demonstrate his atonement. The foundation of another madrasa may have also been necessitated by Abu Tashfin's expansion of the Zayyanid state's administration and bureaucracy. He also had a reputation for supporting Islamic scholarship, and he appointed an expert of Maliki law, Abu Imran al-Meshdali, to a teaching position at the new madrasa, which would have thus helped ensure the state's ability to train and recruit able bureaucrats. A third Zayyanid madrasa in Tlemcen was founded by Abu Hammu Musa II in 1363–1364, which later fell into ruin during the Ottoman period.

The madrasa was located directly south of the Great Mosque of Tlemcen, an 11th-century foundation. Along the western and southern walls of the mosque was a necropolis where the Zayyanid sultans were buried. The madrasa's proximity to these tombs may have also conferred to it a certain funerary aspect. During the Zayyanid period the madrasa was largely used to house the students, while the courses themselves were generally taught in the neighbouring mosque. The madrasa was restored in the mid-15th century by a later Zayyanid sultan, Abu al-Abbas Ahmad ibn Musa (r. 1430–1462), by which point it had become an annex of the nearby Zawiya of Sayyidi Lah'san al-Mazili (or Sidi Lahsen), a popular Muslim religious figure or saint who died in 1453 and was buried in the zawiya. Reports from the 19th century indicate that a funduq (urban caravanserai) stood adjacent to the south-west side of the madrasa.

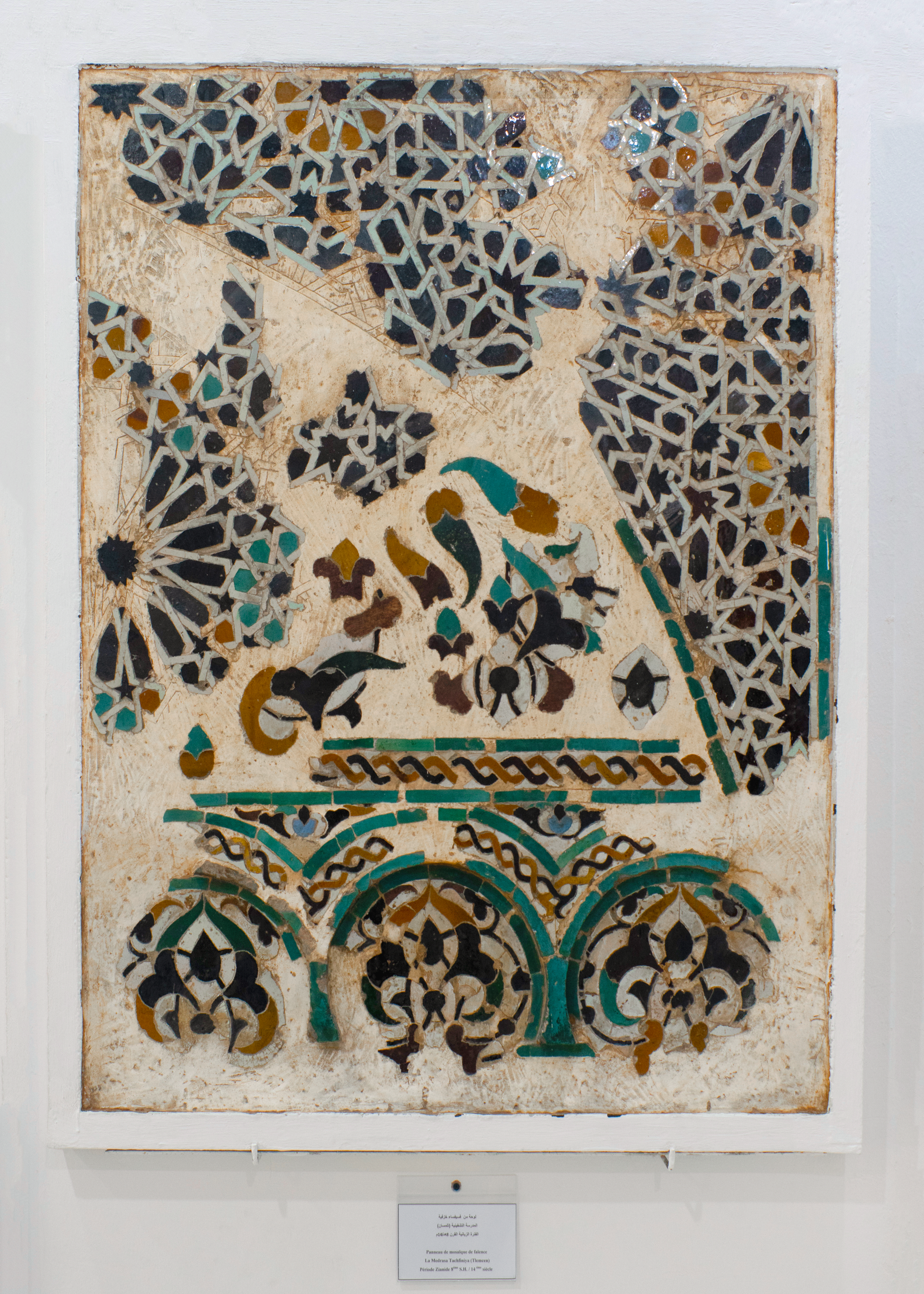
Fragments of zellij decoration from the madrasa, preserved at the National Museum of Antiquities and Islamic Art in Algiers

After the French conquest of Tlemcen in 1842, the madrasa was used as a military warehouse and then later declared a historic monument. As early as 1845 the new French colonial authorities, specifically the Service du génie ("Engineering Service"), discussed demolishing parts of the madrasa in order to connect or merge two public squares on either side of the madrasa as part of a project to remodel this part of the city and improve military movements and logistics. Starting in 1848, the French municipal authorities made attempts to acquire the madrasa's property for eventual demolition. Various municipal commissions reiterated demands for its demolition in 1853, 1855, and 1856. After the army ceded the madrasa to the municipality in 1870, the demolition was finally approved in 1873 and was carried out in 1876.

Right before the demolition, French architect Edmond Duthoit requested that parts of the celebrated tile mosaic decoration (zellij) of the madrasa be removed for preservation in a French museum. Portions of the tilework on the madrasa's entrance portal, its fountain, and some of its rooms were removed by Edmond Duthoit and another French architect, Édouard Danjoy. The two architects also recorded the madrasa's floor plan and made detailed coloured drawings recording the appearance of the entrance portal and its original tile decoration. The preserved fragments were kept at the Cluny Museum in Paris until the early 20th century, when they were returned to the National Museum of Antiquities and Islamic Art in Algiers. The pieces are now preserved at the museum in Algiers as well as a local museum in Tlemcen.

== Architecture ==
=== Layout ===
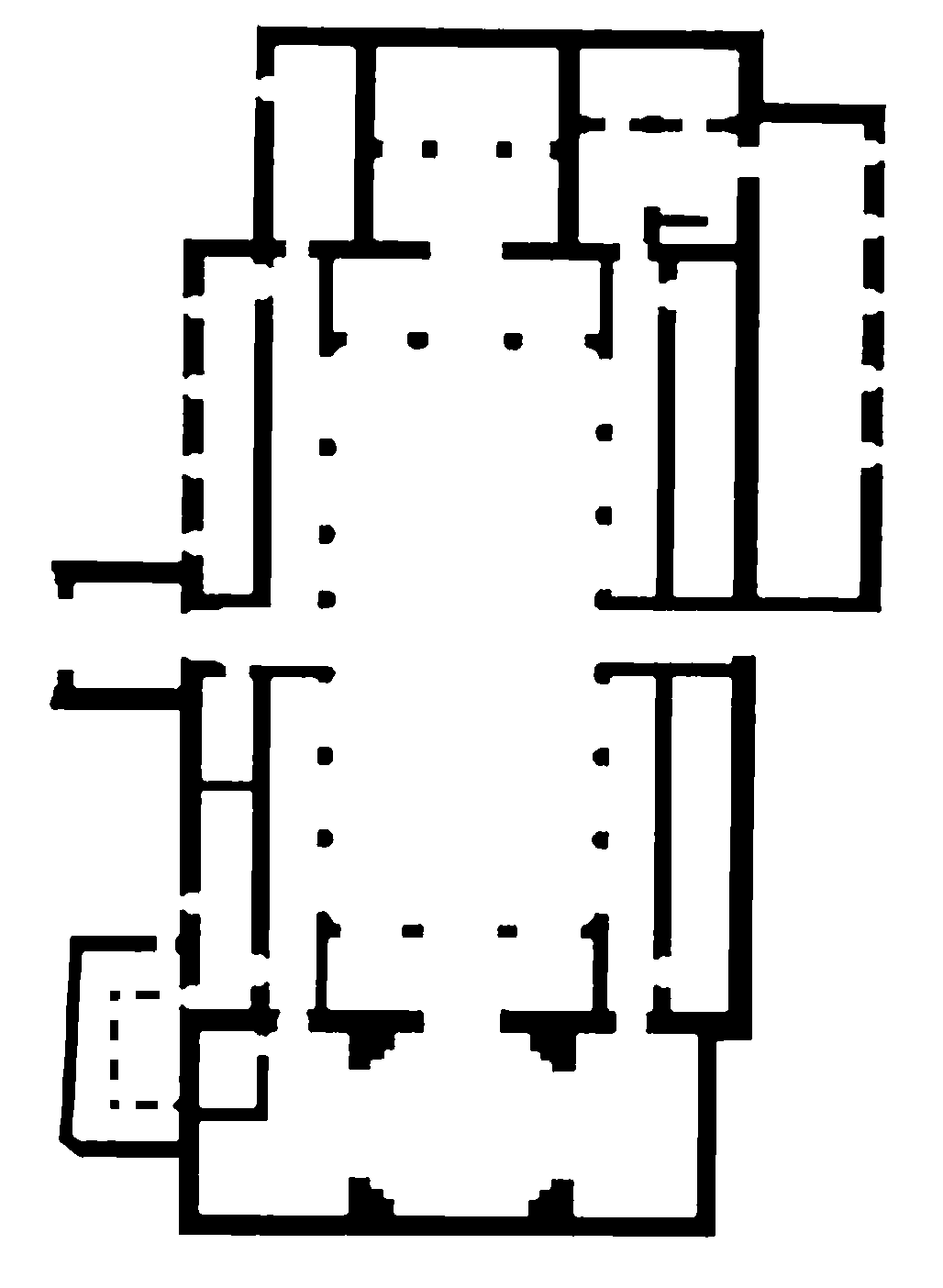
Floor plan of the madrasa, according to 19th-century surveys

The layout of the madrasa and some of its decoration are known thanks to the documentation made in the 19th century before its demolition. It had a rectangular floor plan measuring approximately 22 by 13.4 metres (72 by 44 ft), with its long axis oriented roughly north to south. Inside, the building was centered around a large internal rectangular courtyard measuring 11.2 by 4.8 metres (37 by 16 ft). The regularity of the floor plan suggests that Abu Tashfin may have ordered the demolition of any previous structures on this site, thus allowing the architects to design the building without the space restrictions that normally came with a central urban location at the time. The madrasa had two entrances which were located at the middle of the two longer sides of this rectangle, to the east and west. The main entrance, on the west side, had a monumental portal on the outside which protruded above the rest of the building's walls. In the 19th century this portal measured 6.4 metres (21 ft) wide and 8.65 metres (28.4 ft) tall, but its condition at the time was partly ruined; its original height, complete with a projecting canopy or eaves at the top, was probably around 10.7 metres (35 ft).

The internal courtyard was surrounded on all four sides by a portico of arches, some or all of which were horseshoe arches. On the longer sides of the courtyard (west and east), the porticos led to various rooms and chambers behind them, which were used as accommodations for students and travelers. On the shorter sides (the north and south sides), the porticos had three arches and were enclosed by walls on either side, forming a kind of antechamber open to the courtyard side. These side walls may have been added later, after the original design, as similar madrasas of the time had uninterrupted porticos along the entire length of the courtyard. The middle arch of the southern portico sheltered an ornamental fountain and water basin. Behind the northern portico was a square chamber, which was likely used for meetings or for teaching. Behind the southern portico was a large rectangular chamber which served as a prayer hall. The prayer hall was divided into three sections: the central section contained the mihrab and was covered by a large cupola or dome ceiling, while the two side sections were covered by berchla ceilings (a type of sloped wood-frame ceiling).

The overall layout of the courtyard and the prayer hall has strong similarities with the design of contemporary Marinid madrasas and of the Nasrid madrasa in Granada, demonstrating that the architecture of the Zayyanids in Tlemcen was well-integrated into the wider artistic and cultural environment comprising the Maghreb and al-Andalus (present-day Spain).

=== Decoration ===
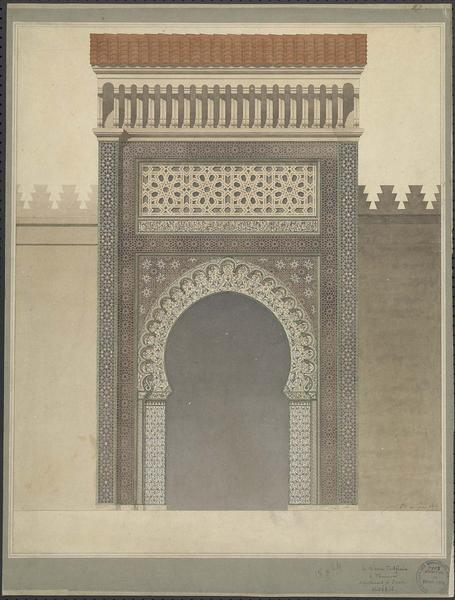
Reconstruction of the original entrance portal, in a drawing by Édouard Danjoy in 1873

The best-known feature of the madrasa's decoration was its extensive use of colourful zellij tilework, which covered many surfaces of the building. In this style, tile pieces of different colours – turquoise, light blue, black, and white – and shapes were combined in mosaics to form elaborate arabesque or geometric motifs. The decoration of the madrasa's main entrance portal was recorded and partly reconstituted in drawings by Édouard Danjoy. The portal had a large horseshoe archway. The curve of this arch was ringed with a line of miniature horseshoe arches in relief, which in turn were covered by zellij featuring floral/vegetal motifs consisting of palmettes over a background of scrollwork. The archway was set inside a large alfiz (a rectangular frame). The vertical and horizontal bands along this alfiz and the spandrels of the archway were covered in zellij with star-like geometric motifs, with those of the alfiz bands featuring twelve-pointed stars and those of the spandrels featuring both eight-pointed and sixteen-pointed stars. Above the frame of the archway was another rectangular zone that framed a rectangular panel with another motif of eight-pointed stars and a horizontal band containing an Arabic inscription in cursive script. Above this was most likely a canopy or wide eave similar to those found above other Andalusi and North African portals.

Of the decoration in the rest of the madrasa, much less is known. A preserved fragment of carved stucco decoration, featuring part of a Kufic Arabic inscription, has been uncertainly attributed to the madrasa, but no other examples of this type have survived. However, there are multiple fragments and illustrations of more zellij tiling from various parts of the madrasa, including from the pavement around the water fountain, from the northern hall, from the threshold of the prayer hall, and from the facades of the courtyard porticos. Most of these samples feature floral arabesque motifs related to the motifs around the arch of the madrasa entrance.

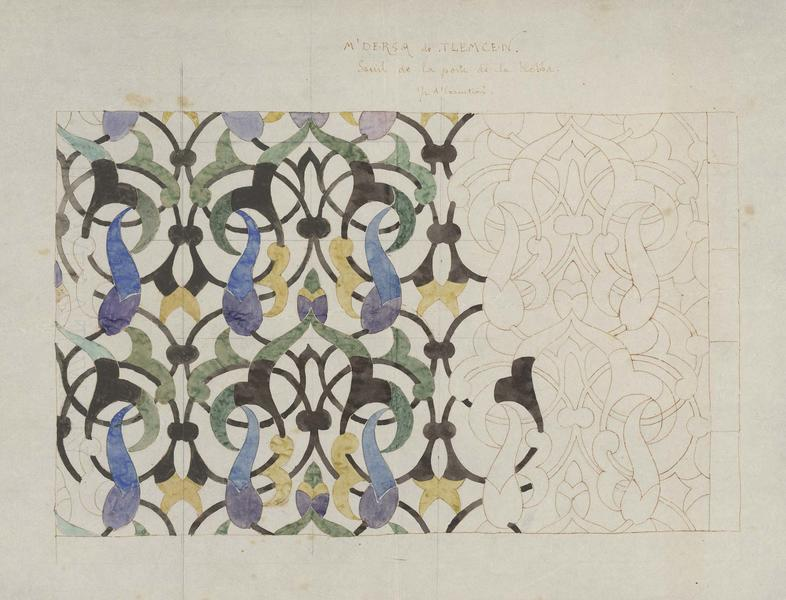
Illustration of the zellij paving at the threshold of the madrasa's prayer hall (drawn by Édouard Danjoy in 1873)

The zellij decoration of the madrasa is evidence that Zayyanid tilemakers in Tlemcen had an advanced mastery of their craft and of the geometry required to create these mosaics. The same style of zellij has been found on later Zayyanid and Marinid monuments in the city, including on the portal of the Sidi Bu Madyan Mosque and in a fragment uncovered in 2008 at the Mechouar Palace, all dating from the 14th century. A very similar style of zellij is also found, exceptionally, in the decoration of a portal in the madrasa-zawiya of Chellah, the dynastic necropolis of the Marinids near present-day Rabat, which suggests that a workshop of craftsmen from Tlemcen may have been working for the Marinids around this time.

A contemporary description of the madrasa is provided by the Andalusi traveler Abdallah ibn al-Sabbah, who visited Tlemcen and extolled the building as a "paradise on earth," distinguished by its solid construction, muqarnas (stalactite-vaulted) ceilings, and doors inlaid with ornamental decoration. He mentions a basin at the center of the madrasa filled with fresh water whose purity and clarity was such that one could see one’s face reflected in it. He designated the institution as the "Madrasa of Sidi Sa'id al-Uqbani" (d. c. 1408), likely because of the close association of this renowned scholar and qadi with the madrasa, where he held a teaching position.
