= Zayyanid–Iberian conflicts =

- Part of the Colonization of Africa
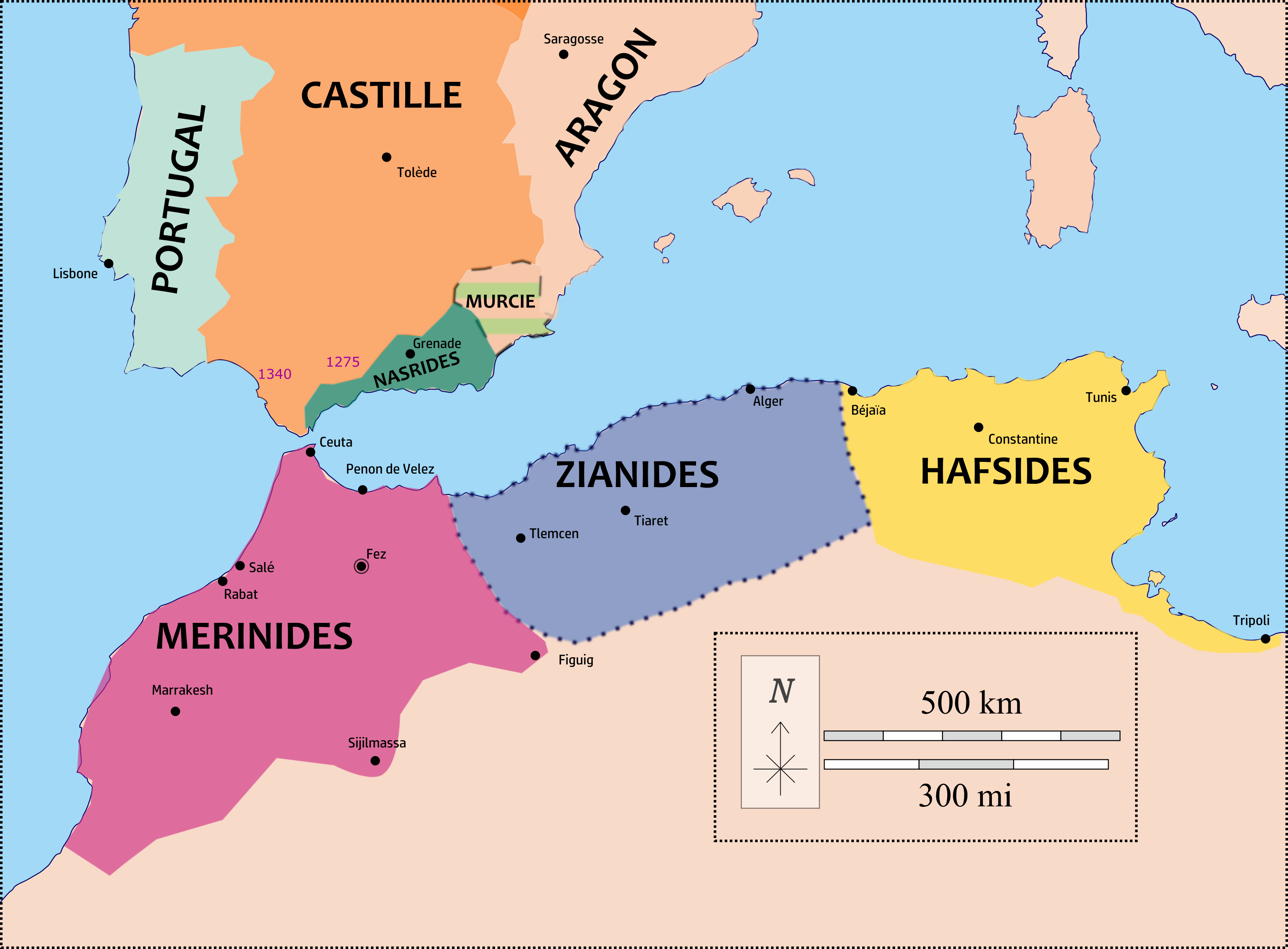
- Map of the Zayyanid dynasty and the Iberian peninsula
Date	1415–1543
Location	North Africa

Belligerents
Kingdom of Portugal; Spanish Empire	Kingdom of Tlemcen

Commanders and leaders
John I Afonso V Duke Medina Sidonia; Pedro de Estopiñán; Count of Tarouca; Ramón de Cardona; Marquis of Comares; Count of Oliveto; Cardinal Cisneros; Count Alcaudete; Abu Abdallah VI	Abu Abdallah IV; Abu Abdallah V Mulay Muhammad; Mansur bin Ghani; Abu Zayyan III

The Zayyanid–Iberian conflicts were a series of military engagements between the Kingdom of Portugal and the Spanish Empire against the Kingdom of Tlemcen from 1415 to 1543.

== Zayyanid–Portuguese conflicts (1415–1501) ==
=== Portuguese occupation of Mers el-Kébir (1415–1437) ===
Some European historians recount that the Portuguese occupied Mers El Kébir and Oran on August 14, 1415, due to increasing piracy in the region. During the reign of King John I, the occupied city remained a target for attacks launched by the Zayyanid forces. Despite the large garrison tasked with defending the Portuguese colony, the Zayyanids were able to recapture the city in 1437, during the reign of King Edward I of Portugal.

=== Portuguese occupation of Oran (1471–1477) ===
With piracy growing each day, the Portuguese King Afonso V launched a new offensive in 1471, this time targeting Oran. However, the occupation did not last long. The city was besieged for six years by the Algerians, forcing the Portuguese forces to withdraw from Oran in 1477, with the approval of King John II of Portugal.

=== Portuguese attack on Mers el-Kébir (1501) ===
In late July 1501, King Manuel I sent a fleet of 35 ships and 3,500 men under João, Count of Tarouca to capture Mers El Kébir and establish a garrison there. A storm delayed their landing for eight days, giving the local Moors and Arabs time to prepare for the invasion. Anticipating the landing site, they gathered a large force to resist the Portuguese. The Portuguese were defeated, and those unable to flee were captured and sold as slaves in Oran.

== Zayyanid–Spanish conflicts (1497–1543) ==
=== Spanish expedition to Oran and Mers el-Kébir (1497) ===
King Ferdinand resolved that several points along the African coast should be occupied, and in 1497 he dispatched the Duke of Medina Sidonia with sufficient forces to seize Oran and Mers El Kébir. But the enterprise failed, and the Duke had to content himself with the capture of Melilla, on the coast of Morocco.

=== Spanish raid of Tarque (1498) ===
In 1498, a new expedition was organized under Pedro de Estopiñán. After disembarking provisions and military supplies in Melilla, he set course for Tarque, a village in the territory of Oran, where he raided and captured 260 prisoners.

=== Spanish capture of Mers el-Kébir (1505) ===
A fleet of 170 ships gathered at the port of Malaga to transport and supply 7,000 men. Command at sea was held by Ramón de Cardona, and on land by Diego Fernández de Córdoba, Marquis of Comares, with Mers El Kébir as the target of the expedition. The fleet first departed on August 20, 1505, but adverse winds forced it to return. A second attempt on September 3 was also hindered, stopping in Almería. It finally set sail on September 9 and reached the coast of Mers El Kébir on the 11th.

Three carracks, under Juan de Lezcano and Flores de Marquina, approached the castle closely, their hulls protected with wool sacks, and opened heavy fire, drawing the defenders' artillery. Meanwhile, the infantry landed during a rainstorm, took the heights near the city, and fortified their position, from where they could bombard both the fortress and the port's galleys.

On September 12, Zayyanid cavalry attacked but was repelled. The castle's defenders then requested a truce until the 13th, promising to surrender if no reinforcements came. The truce was granted, and when no aid arrived, the defenders evacuated with their families and possessions, and the Spanish took control of the castle. Shortly after, a Zayyanid relief force appeared, but seeing the city lost, it retreated to Oran.

=== Battle of Mers el-Kébir (1507) ===
In 1507, Spanish commander Pedro Navarro launched a major raid from the recently captured city of Mers El Kébir, aiming to plunder central Maghreb. With over 3,000 troops, he sacked several villages, captured 1,500 Moors, and seized 4,000 heads of cattle. Unbeknownst to him, Abu Abdallah V had rallied a large force, including 11,000 cavalry, to respond. As the Spanish celebrated their success, the Zayyanids launched a surprise ambush. Only about 1,000 escaped.

=== Spanish conquest of Oran (1509) ===
In May 1509, Spain launched an expedition against Oran, funded with 39.6 million maravedis. A fleet of 80 naos, 10 galleys, and smaller vessels carried 8,000–12,000 infantry and 3,000–4,000 cavalry from Cartagena to Mers El Kébir, already under Spanish control. On 18 May, the Spanish launched a combined naval and land assault on Oran, then part of the Kingdom of Tlemcen. The city was taken with minimal Spanish losses (fewer than 30), while 4,000 of the 12,000 defenders were killed. On 20 May, Cardinal Cisneros entered the city, already conquered.

=== Vassalization of the Kingdom of Tlemcen (1512) ===
In 1512, the Emir of Tlemcen, Abū 'Abd Allāh V, agreed to become a vassal of Spain, and to pay an annual tax estimated at 12,000 ducats, 12 horses, and 6 hawks to Ferdinand II.

=== Spanish expedition to Tlemcen (1535) ===
In 1534, Count Alcaudete became governor of Oran, aiming to expand Spanish control in North Africa. He allied with Abdulrahman bin Ridwan, chief of the Banu 'Amir tribe, who sought to overthrow the Zayyanid Sultan Muhammad and replace him with his brother. In exchange for Spanish support, bin Ridwan agreed to become a Spanish tributary. Alcaudete sent 600 soldiers, and early victories led several tribes to align with Spain. However, during their return, the Spanish were ambushed at the Tibda fortress by Banu Rashid forces and Sultan Muhammad's vizier, Mansur bin Ghani. Most of the Spanish were killed, with only 70 prisoners surviving.

=== Tlemcen War (1543) ===
==== First Engagements ====
On 27 January, the Spanish left Oran with 14,000 infantrymen and between 500 and 1,500 horsemen.

On 2 February, the first clash occurred near the Isser River. Spanish forces, under Count Alcaudete, faced around 1,500 cavalry and 6,000–8,000 infantry under Al-Mansour ben Bogani. After initial skirmishes, the Spanish repelled the Arab assault with reinforcements, forcing a retreat.

==== Battle of the Isser ====
The Spanish tried to cross the swollen Isser River at night but failed. On 3 February, they reorganized and crossed the river under fire. After pushing through, they routed the enemy and took position in Tibda.

==== Battle of Hauda ben Djafar ====
On 5 February, Count Alcaudete's army faced Abu Zayyan III's force of 45,000, along with 400 Turks from the Regency of Algiers. The Spanish vanguard was ambushed but resisted, while the Count led a decisive charge. After three hours of intense fighting, the Spanish prevailed, and inflicted heavy casualties on the Zayyanids and Turks, whom almost all perished. The rearguard was attacked but held firm and was later reinforced. The enemy attempted to regroup, but Spanish light cavalry dispersed them. Abu Zayyan fled to Angad.

==== Capture of Tlemcen ====
On 6 February, the Spanish entered the city peacefully but looted it shortly after. Abu Abdallah VI was reinstated as king. Other clashes followed, including a successful ambush against a wheat convoy and a retaliatory action after a Spanish outpost was overrun.

==== Final Battles and Withdrawal ====
On 26 February, Abu Abdallah VI accepted vassalage to Spain. As the army prepared to return, they were ambushed in an olive grove by Moroccan forces under Ahmed Segheur. The Spanish, though outnumbered, pushed back the Moroccans.

==== Occupation of Safsaf and Return ====
After securing the bridge of Safsaf with an ambush, the way to Oran was cleared. Minor skirmishes continued during the retreat, but the Spanish finally reached Oran on 8 March, ending the expedition.

== Bibliography ==
- Fkair, Adelkader (2011). "Les Relations Algero-Portugaise Pendant La Periode Ottomane" (PDF) (in French). History Studies.
- Fey, Henri Leon (1858). Histoire d'Oran avant, pendant et après la domination espagnole (in French).
- Fernández Duro, Cesáreo (1895). "Armada Española (desde la unión de los reinos de Castilla y Aragón. Tomo I, 1476-1559)" (PDF) (in Spanish). Madrid: Imprenta Real.
- Bargès, Jean Joseph Leándre (1887). Complément de l'histoire des Beni-Zeiyan, rois de Tlemcen, ouvrage du cheikh Mohammed Abd'al-Djalil al-Tenessy (in French). Paris: E. Leroux.
- Brill, E. J. (1993). E.J. Brill's First Encyclopaedia of Islam: 1913-1936. A - Bābā Beg. BRILL. ISBN 978-90-04-09787-2.
- Ruff, Paul (October 15, 1998). "La campagne de Tlemcen (1543)". La domination espagnole à Oran sous le gouvernement du comte d'Alcaudete, 1534-1558 (in French). Editions Bouchène. pp. 74–101. ISBN 978-2-35676-083-8.
- de Vera, León Galindo (1884). Historia vicisitudes y política tradicional de España respecto de sus posesiones en las costas de África desde la monarquía gótica y en los tiempos posteriores á la restauración hasta el último siglo (in Spanish). University of Oxford Press.
- Alenezi, Adelkader (2022). "The Spanish Campaigns against the Kingdom of Tlemcen's Cities and the Resistance Movements from 1516 to 1530" (PDF). Kuwait University.
