= Battle of Mers El-Kebir =

Battle of Mers-el-Kébir or Mers-el-Kébir expedition may refer to:

- The Battle of Mers-el-Kébir (1501) by Portugal.
- The Capture of Mers-el-Kébir (1505) by Spain.
- The Battle of Mers-el-Kébir (1507), which was an ambush near the city conducted by the Kingdom of Tlemcen.
- The Sieges of Oran and Mers-el-Kébir by Hasan Pasha
- The Capture of Oran (1708) the capture of the city, and it's neighbour (Oran) by the Algerine forces
- The Spanish Conquest of Oran (1732) by Spain
- The Reconquest of Oran and Mers-el-Kébir (1792) by Algeria
- The Conquest of Oran (1831) by French colonial forces
- The Attack on Mers-el-Kébir by British forces
