= 1505 =

1505 in various calendars
- Gregorian calendar: 1505; MDV
- Ab urbe condita: 2258
- Armenian calendar: 954; ԹՎ ՋԾԴ
- Assyrian calendar: 6255
- Balinese saka calendar: 1426–1427
- Bengali calendar: 911–912
- Berber calendar: 2455
- English Regnal year: 20 Hen. 7 – 21 Hen. 7
- Buddhist calendar: 2049
- Burmese calendar: 867
- Byzantine calendar: 7013–7014
- Chinese calendar: 甲子年 (Wood Rat); 4202 or 3995 — to — 乙丑年 (Wood Ox); 4203 or 3996
- Coptic calendar: 1221–1222
- Discordian calendar: 2671
- Ethiopian calendar: 1497–1498
- Hebrew calendar: 5265–5266
- Hindu calendars
- Vikram Samvat: 1561–1562
- Shaka Samvat: 1426–1427
- Kali Yuga: 4605–4606
- Holocene calendar: 11505
- Igbo calendar: 505–506
- Iranian calendar: 883–884
- Islamic calendar: 910–911
- Japanese calendar: Eishō 2 (永正２年)
- Javanese calendar: 1422–1423
- Julian calendar: 1505; MDV
- Korean calendar: 3838
- Minguo calendar: 407 before ROC 民前407年
- Nanakshahi calendar: 37
- Thai solar calendar: 2047–2048
- Tibetan calendar: ཤིང་ཕོ་བྱི་བ་ལོ་ (male Wood-Rat); 1631 or 1250 or 478 — to — ཤིང་མོ་གླང་ལོ་ (female Wood-Ox); 1632 or 1251 or 479

January 24: Pope Julius II divides the world between Portugal and Spain

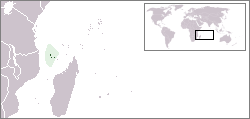
Arabs reach the Comoros.

Year 1505 (MDV) was a common year starting on Wednesday of the Julian calendar.

== Events ==
=== January–March ===
- January 14 – Pope Julius II issues the papal bull Cum tam divino, decreeing a reform in the Roman Catholic Church to prohibit simony, the buying and selling of church offices ranging from bishops to the pope himself.
- January 23 – Lunkaran begins his reign as the Rao of the Indian kingdom of Bikaner in what is now the Rajasthan state of India.
- January 24 – Under the terms of the Treaty of Tordesillas, Pope Julius II sets the line of demarcation in the New World between Spain's and Portugal's territory as a line of longitude 370 leagues west of the Cape Verde islands. The ambiguous definition of the measure of a league places the line between 42°30' W to 49°45' W.
- February 7 – During a visit to Windsor Castle as guests of King Henry VII of England, Philip the Handsome, Duke of Burgundy, plays a game of tennis against Thomas Grey, 2nd Marquess of Dorset in the first recorded use of tennis rackets. A year later, a chronicler notes that on the 7th of February, "the kynge of Castelle played w the Rackete and gave the marques xv".
- March 25 – Appointed as the Viceroy of Portuguese India by King Manuel I of Portugal, Dom Francisco de Almeida departs from Portugal with an armada of 22 ships and 1,500 men, according to one estimate by João de Barros.
- March 31 – King Alexander Jagiellon of Poland agrees to support the Act of Nihil novi, prohibiting the king to issue laws without consent of the nobles represented by their parliament, the Sejm. The official title is "Nihil novi nisi commune consensu", Latin for "Nothing new without common consent."

=== April–June ===
- April 3 – Italian explorer Sebastiano Caboto is granted a lifetime annuity of £10 per year by England's King Henry VII for services "in and aboute the fyndynge of the new founde landes" in North America.
- April 27 – In Tbilisi, David X becomes the new ruler of the Kingdom of Kartli in what is now the Republic of Georgia, upon the death of his father Constantine II.
- May 1 – Christ's College, Cambridge, England, is re-founded, receiving its charter from Lady Margaret Beaufort.
- May 30 – Poland's Act of Nihil novi is granted by King Alexander I Jagiellon after being passed by the Sejm, making Poland a Nobles' Democracy rather than an absolute monarchy.
- June 6 – The M8.2–8.8 Lo Mustang earthquake strikes Nepal, causing severe damage in Kathmandu, western Nepal, and some parts of the Indo-Gangetic plain.
- June 19 – Zhu Houzhao, the 13-year-old son of the late Hongzhi Emperor of Ming Dynasty China, is enthroned as the Zhengde Emperor upon his father's death.
- June 27 – The future King Henry VIII repudiates his engagement to Catherine of Aragon, at his father's command.

=== July–September ===
- July 2
  - The Kalmar Bloodbath, a mass execution of participants in the Swedish Uprising against King Hans of Denmark (who also rules Norway and Sweden) takes place in the Swedish city of Kalmar after a judgment of treason is pronounced against the mayor, city officials and other leaders.
  - Martin Luther, aged 22, vows to become a monk in a moment of terror, as a result of a close lightning strike during a thunderstorm, near the village of Stotternheim.
- July 17 – Luther enters the monastic life, at an Augustinian cloister in Erfurt called St. Augustine's Monastery.
- July 24 – Travelling to India, a group of Portuguese explorers led by Francisco de Almeida, with 22 ships and 1,500 men, sack the city-state of Kilwa in East Africa, killing the Emir Abraham for failing to pay tribute. Almeida installs Mohammed Ankoni as the new ruler.
- August 15 – The Portuguese State of India is founded in what is now the state of Kerala, after the Kingdom of Portugal takes over territory of the Bijapur sultanate at Calicut.
- August 16 – Almeida's fleet destroys the East African city of Mombassa.
- September 13
  - Francisco de Almeida arrives in the Anjediva Islands to begin construction on the first of four fortresses he needed to construct for his appointment as viceroy.
  - In what is now Algeria, the Spanish Army under the command of Ramón de Cardona, captures the city of Mers-el-Kébir, a port of the Zayyanid Kingdom of Tlemcen, ruled by the Sultan Abu Abdallah V.

=== October–December ===
- October 11 – Lucien Grimaldi takes over as the new Lord of Monaco after stabbing his brother Jean II to death.
- October 23 – In Portuguese India, the King of Cannanore gives permission to Francisco de Almeida to build the Fortaleza de Santo Ângelo in Kannur.
- November 6 (October 27 O.S.) – Vasili III succeeds Ivan III, as Grand Prince of Muscovy, comprising much of modern-day Russia.
- November 15 – Portuguese explorer Lourenço de Almeida and his fleet encounter a storm and are driven to the island of Sri Lanka and travels to Colombo. The King of Kotte, Dharma Parakramabahu IX, allows Almeida to build a trade station and a Roman Catholic chapel.
- November 24 – The Treaty of Salamanca is signed by Spain's King Ferdinand II of Aragon and Philip, Duke of Burgundy, agreeing that the two will serve as co-regents for Joanna the Mad, Queen of Castile.
- December 30 – Érard de La Marck is elected prince-bishop of Liège.

=== Date unknown ===
- The Pomander Watch of 1505, the earliest known pocket watch, is made by Peter Henlein in Germany at Nuremberg. After an absence of 480 years, the watch will be rediscovered at a flea market in London; an inscription on the watch, "MDVPHN", will be interpreted in 2014 as meaning a rendition of the year (MDV, 1505 in Roman numerals); the inventor (PH for Peter Henlein) and the place of manufacture (N for Nuremberg).
- Portuguese merchants establish factories and fortresses on the east coast of Africa in Kilwa, Sofala, and Malindi.
- Bermuda is discovered by Spanish explorer Juan de Bermúdez.
- Judah Abravanel becomes personal physician to the viceroy of Naples.
- Battle of Achnashellach in Scotland: The Clan Cameron emerges victorious over Clan Munro and Clan MacKay.
- Portuguese explorer Gonçalo Álvares is the first to sight what will later be known as Gough Island in the South Atlantic.
- The St Catherine's Monastery on the Sinai is captured and sacked by Bedouins. Though the Mamluk sultan attempts to punish the raiders, he is unable to subdue them and preserve order.
- Old St. Peter's Basilica is demolished under the orders of Pope Julius II. Construction of the new basilica begins the following year.

== Births ==
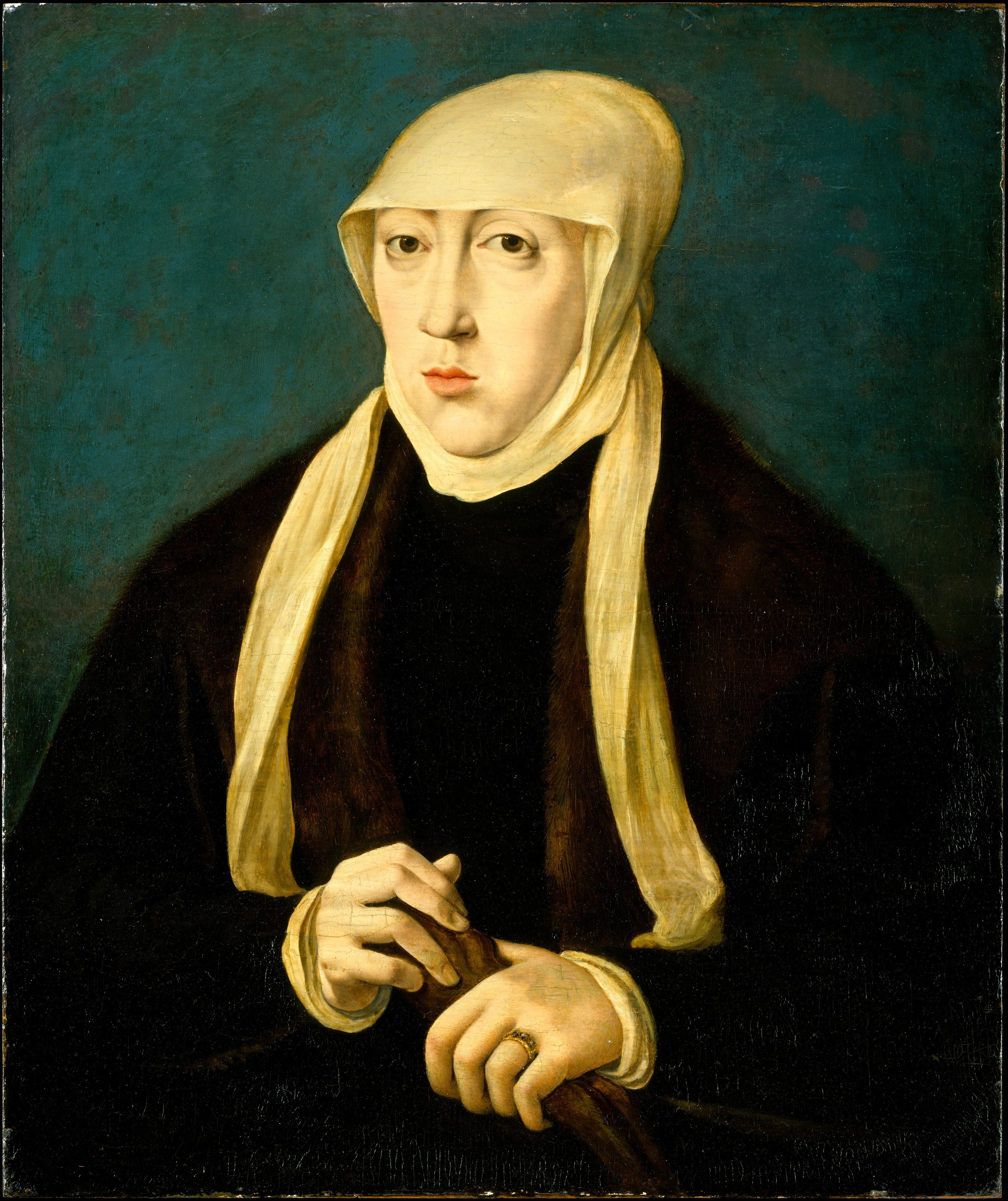
Mary of Hungary

- January 12 – Louis, Count of Stolberg, German nobleman (d. 1574)
- January 13 – Joachim II Hector, Elector of Brandenburg, Imperial Elector (d. 1571)
- February 4 – Mikołaj Rej, Polish poet and prose writer, politician and musician of the Renaissance (d. 1569)
- February 5 – Aegidius Tschudi, Swiss historian (d. 1572)
- March 16 – Francisco Balbi di Correggio (d. 1589)
- March 25 – Elizabeth Grey, Viscountess Lisle, English heiress (d. 1519)
- May 20 – Levinus Lemnius, Dutch writer (d. 1568)
- September 15 – Mary of Hungary, Dutch ruler (d. 1558)
- September 23 – Anne de Laval, Viscountess of Thouars, French noblewoman and nominal pretender to the Kingdom of Naples (d. 1554)
- November 3 – Achilles Gasser, German physician and astrologer (d. 1577)
- November 23 – Ercole Gonzaga, Spanish Catholic cardinal (d. 1563)
- December 18 – Philipp von Hutten, German explorer (d. 1546)
- December 21 – Thomas Wriothesley, 1st Earl of Southampton, English politician (d. 1550)
- December 25 – Christine of Saxony, German noble (d. 1549)
- date unknown
  - Philip Hoby, English politician (d. 1558)
  - Guillaume Morel, French classical scholar (d. 1564)
  - Margaret Roper, English writer (d. 1544)
  - Shahghali, Khan of Qasim
- probable
  - Christopher Tye, English composer and organist (d. 1572)
  - Jane Boleyn, Viscountess Rochford, English noblewoman (executed 1542)

== Deaths ==
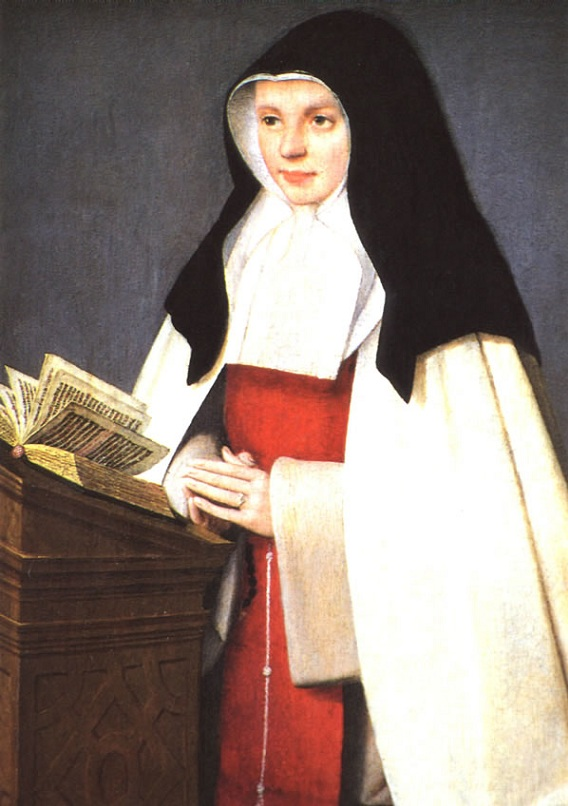
Saint Jeanne de Valois

Emperor Hongzhi

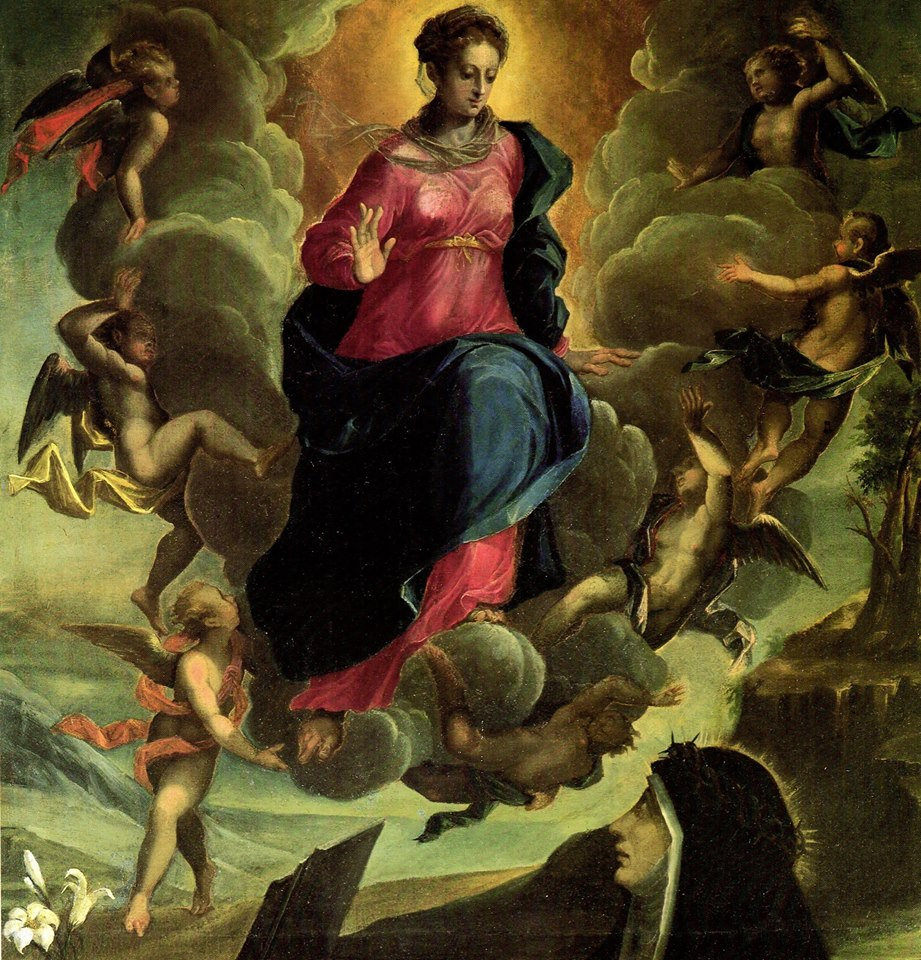
Blessed Osanna of Mantua

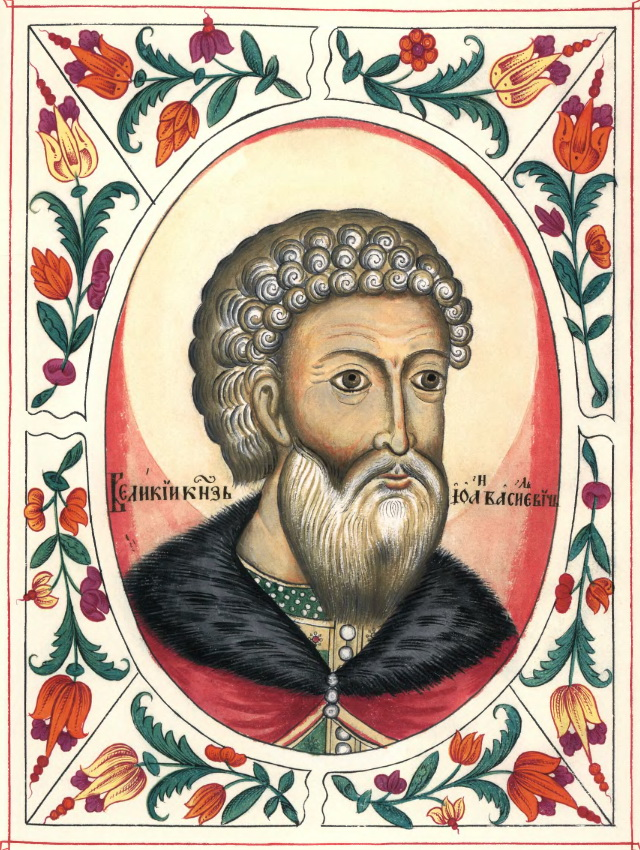
Ivan III of Russia

- January 25 – Ercole I d'Este, Duke of Ferrara, Italian politician (b. 1431)
- February 4 – Jeanne de Valois, French princess, Roman Catholic nun and saint (b. 1464)
- February 19 – Matilda of Hesse, German noblewoman (b. 1473)
- February 20 – Arvid Trolle, Swedish politician (b. 1440)
- March 5 – Philip of Cleves, Bishop of Nevers, Amiens, Autun (b. 1467)
- March 29 – Sidonie of Bavaria, eldest daughter of Duke Albrecht IV of Bavaria-Munich (b. 1488)
- April 23 – Muhammad Jaunpuri, Indian-born religious leader (b. 1443)
- May 28 – Ascanio Sforza, Italian Roman Catholic cardinal (b. 1455)
- June 8 – Hongzhi Emperor of China (b. 1470)
- June 18 – Osanna of Mantua, Italian Dominican tertiary and blessed (b. 1449)
- July – Jacob Obrecht, Flemish composer (plague) (b. 1457)
- October 27 – Emperor Ivan III of Russia (b. 1440)
- date unknown
  - Adam of Fulda, German music writer (b. c. 1445)
  - Heinrich Kramer, German churchman and inquisitor (b. 1430)
