= Conquest of Oran =

Conquest of Oran may refer to:

- Capture of Mers-el-Kébir (1505)
- Spanish conquest of Oran (1509)
- Spanish conquest of Oran (1732)
