= Spanish conquest of Oran =

Spanish conquest of Oran may refer to:

- Spanish conquest of Oran (1509)
- Spanish conquest of Oran (1732)
