= Ribauldequin =

Late medieval volley gun

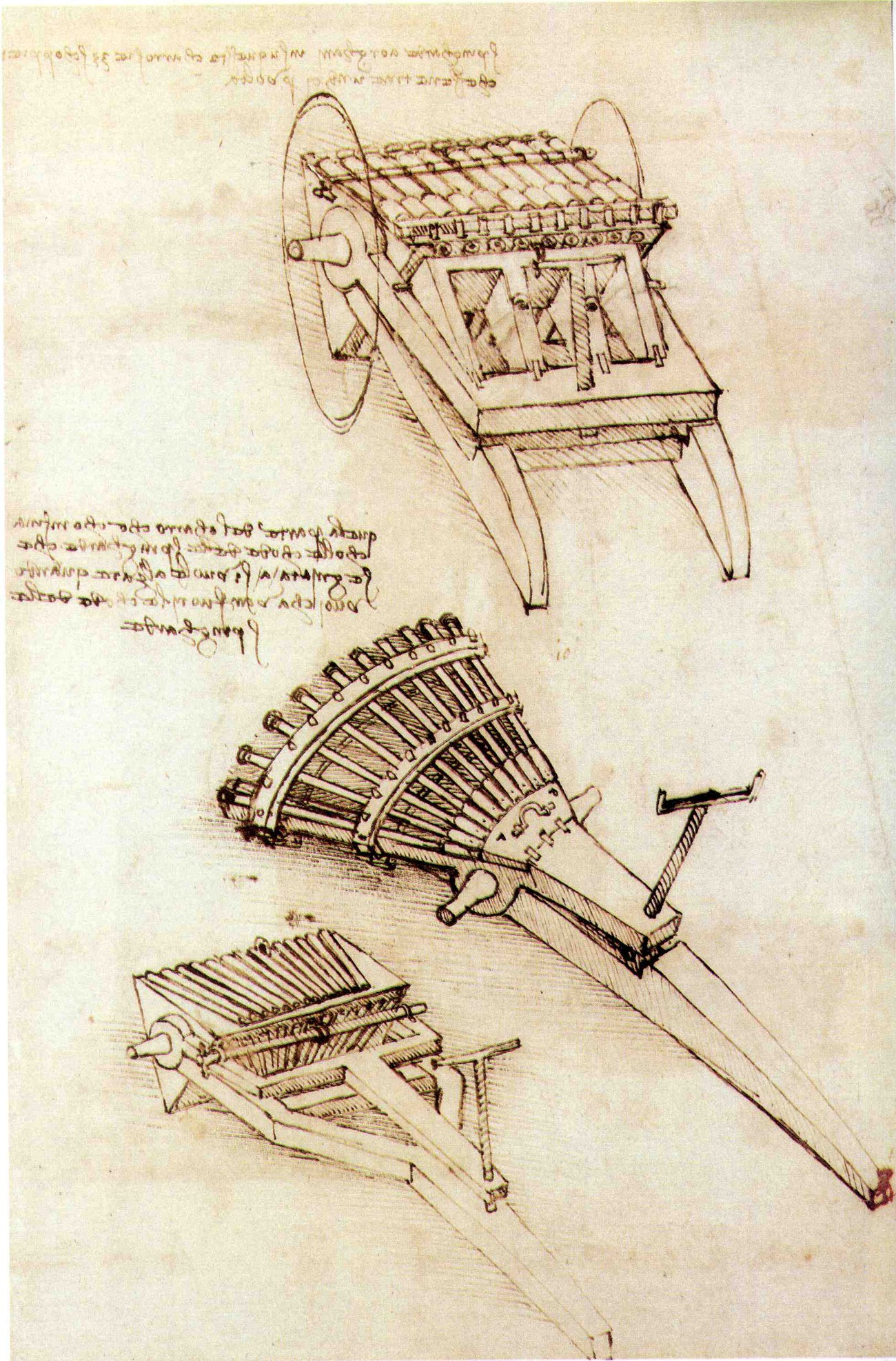
A drawing of ribauldequins, as designed by Leonardo da Vinci.

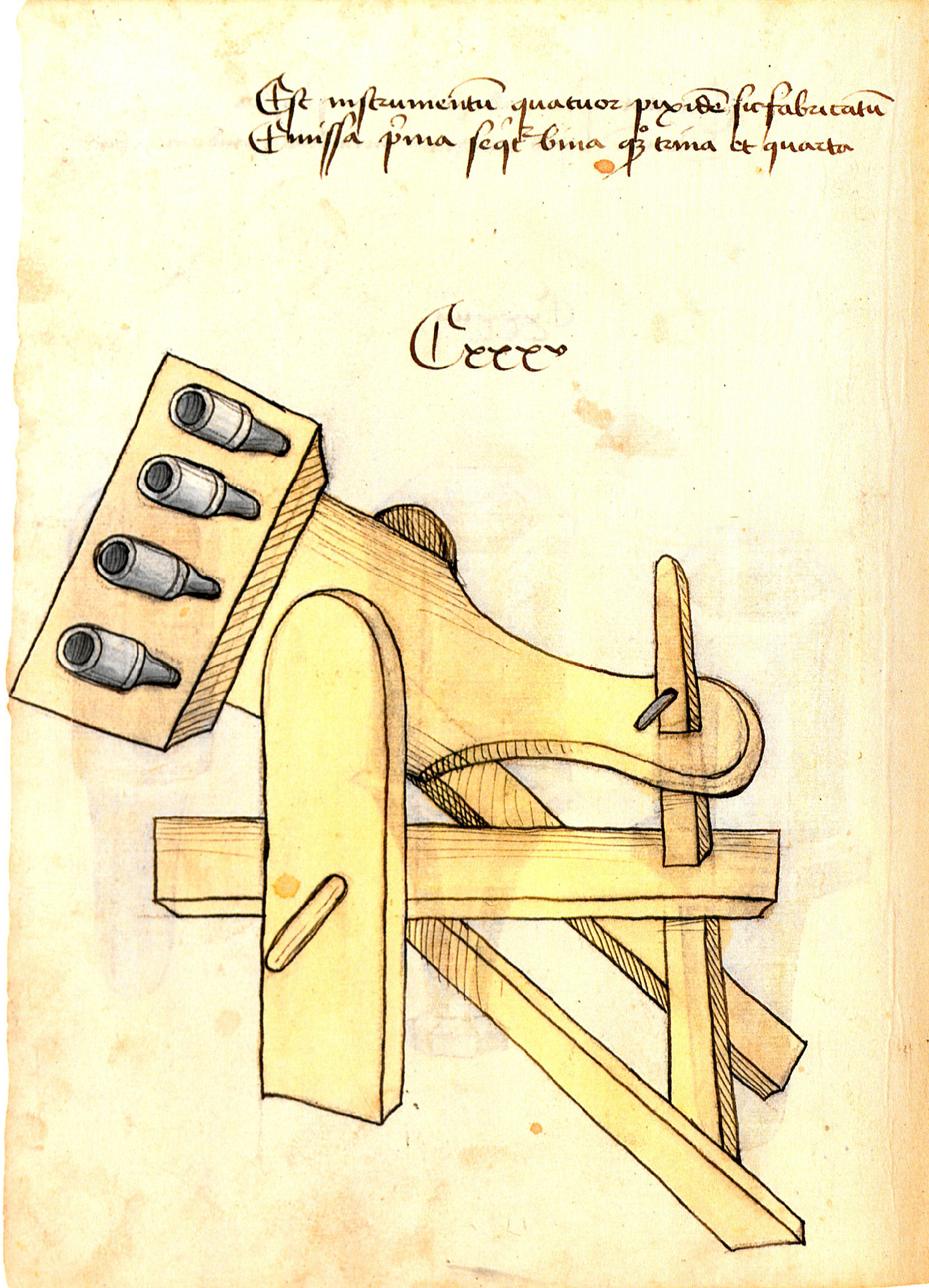
Organ gun in the Bellifortis treatise (written ca. 1405, illustration from Clm 30150, ca. 1430)

A ribauldequin, also known as a rabauld, randy, ribault, ribaudkin, infernal machine or organ gun, was a late medieval volley gun with many small-caliber iron barrels set up parallel on a platform, in use in medieval and early modern Europe during the Renaissance period. The name organ gun comes from the resemblance of the multiple barrels to a pipe organ.

When the gun was fired, multiple barrels discharged their projectiles at once, yielding a much higher rate of fire than single-barrel (typically larger-caliber) guns. Organ guns were lighter and more mobile than most previous artillery pieces, making them more suitable for engaging enemy personnel rather than fixed fortifications such as castles. As an early type of multiple-barrel firearm, the ribauldequin is sometimes considered the predecessor of the 19th century mitrailleuse.

== History ==
The first known ribauldequin was used by the army of Edward III of England in 1339 in France during the Hundred Years' War. Edward's ribauldequins had twelve barrels which fired salvoes of twelve balls. Ribauldequins were also used in the Wars of the Roses. During the Second Battle of St Albans, Burgundian soldiers under Yorkist control utilized the weapon against the Lancastrian Army led by Queen Margaret of Anjou.

Juan de Lezcano mounted ribauldequins in his ships during the Spanish conquest of Mers-el-Kébir. Nine-barreled ribaults were used by Milan and other participants in the Italian Wars. King Louis XII of France is believed to have possessed an organ gun with 50 barrels, all of which fired at once. Pedro Navarro used organ guns against the French at the Battle of Ravenna, on 11 April 1512. In Eastern Europe such guns were commonplace into the 17th century.

== See also ==
- Hwacha
- Puckle gun
- Volley gun
- Wall gun
- Infernal machine (weapon)

=== Similar weapons ===
- Mitrailleuse
- Gardner gun
- Nordenfelt gun
- AAI In-Line, prototype modern day equivalent
