= Spanish assault on Djerba (1510) =

| Date | 26 August – 3 September 1510 |
| Location | island of Djerba off the coast of Tunisia |
| Result | Hafsid victory |

Belligerents
| Spanish Empire | Hafsid dynasty |

Commanders and leaders
| García Álvarez de Toledo; Pedro Navarro | Unknown |

Strength
| 15,000 men | Unknown |

Casualties and losses
| 2,000–4,000 killed | Unknown |

The Spanish assault on Djerba was a 1510 military expedition directed by Ferdinand II of Aragon against the Tunisian island of Djerba. It resulted in the death of several thousand soldiers and is often known as the Djerba Disaster (Spanish: Desastre de los Gelves).

== Background ==
The Spanish conquest of Oran (1509) generated an enthusiasm that prompted the crown to form new expeditions of conquest. In December 1509, a force gathered in Ibiza and Formentera, led by Pedro Navarro, with the aim of taking several places on the Barbary Coast. On January 1, 1510, 20 ships and between four and five thousand men left, bound for Béjaïa, landing on the 5th and taking the city in the face of weak resistance.

A battle on the outskirts of the city encouraged Algiers and Tunis to pay homage – nominally at least – to king Ferdinand. After an epidemic that caused a hundred deaths, the Spaniards moved to Favignana, where they resupplied. On July 15, 1510, they embarked for Tripoli. The city was assaulted and sacked, with thousands of defenders killed and the majority of the civilian population taken as slaves and captives.

== The Djerba disaster ==
On July 29, 1510, Pedro Navarro left Tripoli with a few boats making for Djerba to require its submission. His demands were rejected, so he returned to Tripoli. García Álvarez de Toledo arrived along with 3000 men and the rank of captain general, replacing Pedro Navarro at the head of the troops. On August 26 they embarked and arrived on Djerba on the 29th.

The force disembarked in rowing boats. The 15,000 men had no beasts of burden so had to haul the artillery pieces themselves, carrying the ammunition and gunpowder on their shoulders. The units formed up and the march to Djerba castle begins. The heat and the lack of water caused hardship and the soldiers gradually abandoned their positions to reach some wells in a palm grove.

Near this place, defenders on horseback awaited them, and overcame several hundred soldiers of the Spanish vanguard who were refreshing themselves. Immediately, the Spanish infantrymen began to flee, gathering those who, like them, had separated from their squadrons to make for the wells, and spreading panic among their comrades in arms. Many abandoned their weapons and armor to flee with more speed. García Álvarez de Toledo y Zúñiga took a pike and tried to mount a defense, but was killed by the attackers.

The troops continued their retreat back to the point where they were landed. The rowing boats had been sent to control the narrow passage that connects the island with the mainland, and the other ships could not manoeuvre close to shore. The soldiers threw themselves into the sea to try to reach them, and their captains sent skiffs out to pick them up. Many drowned in the attempt to escape in the overloaded boats.

When night fell there were still 3,000 men to embark. Many were killed or captured during the night, and others the following morning. Some captains refused to allow more soldiers to board their ships because they did not have enough water for them, and they made off for Naples. Then a storm blew up, in which two caravels and a galleon ran aground with most of their men drowning. Some survived by clinging to the masts and Navarro sent two ships to collect them.

== Aftermath ==
On Tuesday, September 3, with a favorable wind, the entire fleet departed, but offshore winds dispersed the vessels. It is estimated that between 2,000 and 4,000 men had died on the expedition. On October 4, the bulk of what remained of the fleet – 8000 men on 60 ships – left Tripoli heading north, but a new storm caused the loss of more ships. They gathered again in Tripoli: 30 ships and 5,000 embarked men then set sail for Lampedusa, where they wintered.

== Legacy ==
The defeat at Djerba in 1510 was such a blow to the Spanish that it was commemorated in verse and popular sayings. Garcilaso de la Vega wrote: "¡Oh patria lagrimosa, y cómo vuelves los ojos a los Gelves, sospirando!... El arena quemaba, el sol ardía, la gente se caía medio muerta ..." ("Oh tearful motherland, how you turn your eyes to Djerba, sighing! .... The sand burned, the sun blazed, the men fell half dead....") The campaign is also mentioned in Luis de Góngora's verse La más bella niña: "En los Gelves nací, el año que os perdisteis en los Gelves, de una berberisca noble y de un turco matasiete." ("At Djerba I was born, the year you were routed in Djerba, from a noble Berber woman and a Turkish loudmouth.")

The disaster also prompted the Spanish expression Los Gelves, madre, malos son de ganare. and "Lloraba la viuda de los Gelves, tocas blancas en años verdes" ("The widow of Djerba was crying, white hats in green years"). The protagonist of Lazarillo de Tormes is described as son of a man who died at the Djerba action. The debate about whether this means the 1510 or the 1520 operation is linked to the debate about the date of composition of the book.

== See also ==
- Spanish assault on Djerba (1520)
- Battle of Djerba (1560)
