= Church of San Torcuato =

Church building in Santorcaz, Spain

- Iglesia Parroquial de San Torcuato (Spanish)
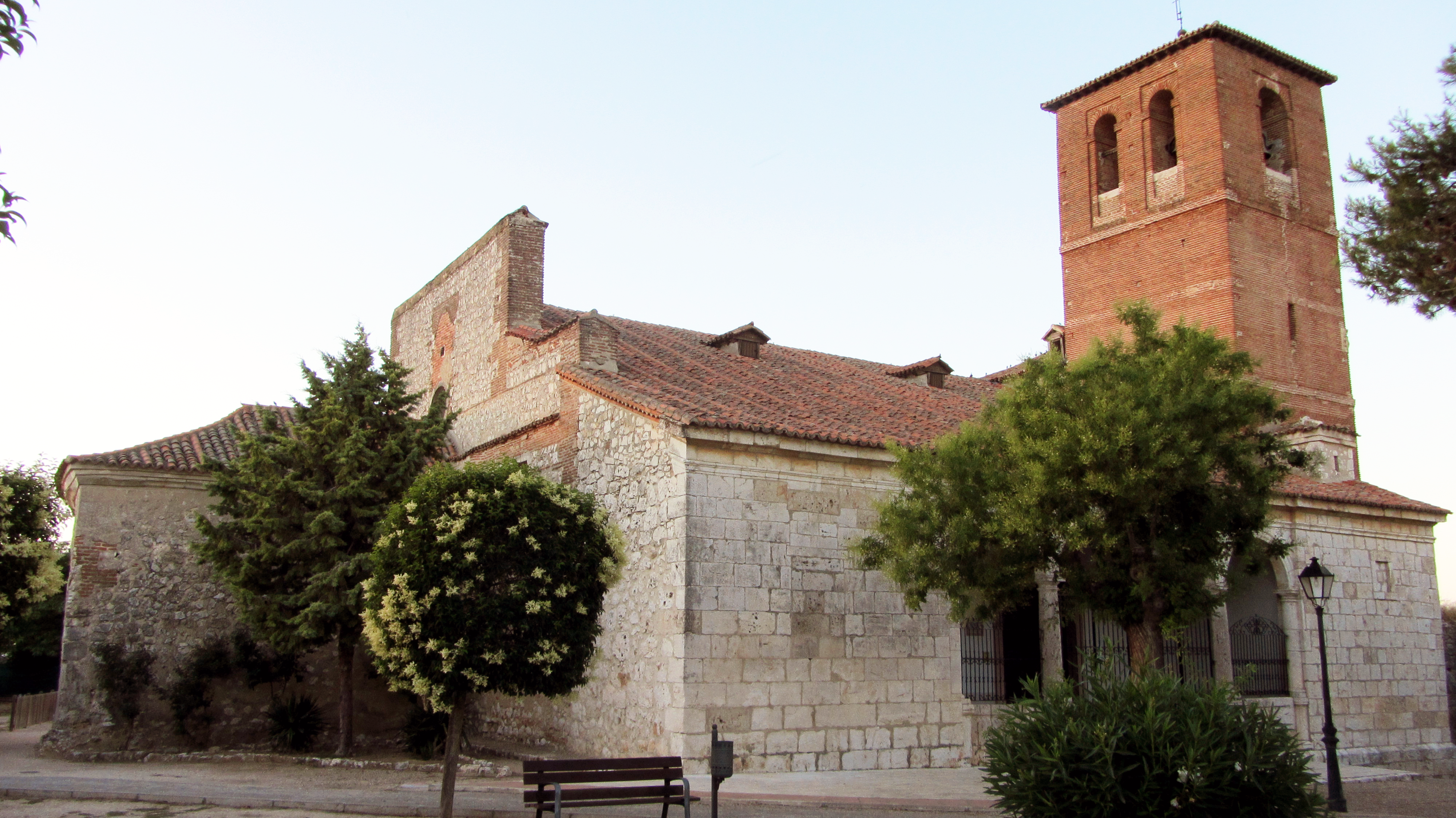

- Location within Spain
- 40°28′20″N 3°14′06″W
- Location: Santorcaz, Spain

Spanish Cultural Heritage
- Official name: Iglesia Parroquial de San Torcuato
- Type: Non-movable
- Criteria: Monument
- Designated: 1997
- Reference no.: RI-51-0009953

The Church of San Torcuato (Spanish: Iglesia Parroquial de San Torcuato) is a church in Santorcaz, Spain. It was declared Bien de Interés Cultural in 1997.
