= Spanish assault on Djerba (1520) =

1520 Spanish military expedition

Date	28 May 1520
Location	island of Djerba off the coast of Tunisia
Result	Spanish victory

Belligerents
Spanish Empire	Hafsid dynasty

Commanders and leaders
Hugo of Moncada	Sheikh Said

Strength
10,000–13,000; 13 galleys 70 ships	10,000–12,000 men 200 cavalry

Casualties and losses
260 killed	500 killed

The Spanish assault on Djerba was a 1520 Spanish military expedition against the island of Djerba in Tunisia. Led by Hugo of Moncada, it ended with the capitulation of the island's sheikh, who became a tributary of Emperor Charles V.

== Background ==
In 1510, during the reign of Ferdinand II of Aragon, García Álvarez de Toledo y Zúñiga had tried to take the island. His expedition was a failure and came to be known in Spanish as the Djerba disaster ("Desastre de los Gelves"). Charles V had also sent a failed expedition to Algiers in 1518, and in 1519 Hugo of Moncada was defeated at sea by corsairs. The island of Djerba was nominally within the domains of Abu Abdallah Muhammad IV al-Mutawakkil of Ifriqiya but it was actually under the control of the Corsair commanders Oruç Reis and Hayreddin Barbarossa.

In 1519 Charles V decided to prepare an expedition to take the island and eliminate the Corsair threat. Command of the fleet was given to Don Hugo de Moncada with the title of captain general. During the summer of 1519 preparations were made in Barcelona, Valencia, Cartagena and Malaga, and after the ships met in Ibiza and Formentera, they wintered in Sicily. In mid-April 1520, the navy left for the shores of Tunisia. Moncada arrived in Djerba with 13 galleys, 70 ships and between 10,000 and 13,000 infantry.

== Battle ==
After landing the army about 18 miles from Djerba, on 28 May the march against the island began. The Spanish were attacked by the army of Sheikh Said, made up of ten or twelve thousand infantry and two hundred cavalry. Despite initial setbacks, Hugo of Moncada and the Flemish knights under his command managed to repel their enemies, who fled. The local forces had lost about 500 men in the encounter, while the Spanish lost 200 infantrymen and 60 horsemen. After resting for a time, Moncada's army resumed its advance and fortified a hamlet halfway to the castle. The sheikh began negotiations, not waiting for help from the caliph in Tunis, and soon capitulated.

== Aftermath ==
A new Spanish fortress was immediately built, and a Spanish garrison was installed. The sheikh was not dispossessed, but became a tributary of Spain, agreeing to pay a sum of 12,000 francs per year and keep the island free of corsairs.
