= Abu Yahya Zakariya =

Ruler of Ifriqiya (r. 1490–1494)

Ruler of Hafsid Sultanate
- Reign: 1490–1494
- Predecessor: Abd al-Mu'min
- Successor: Muhammad IV
- Died: 1494; Ifriqiya
- House: Hafsid
- Religion: Sunni Islam

Abu Yahya Zakariya (Arabic: أبو يحيى زكرياء) was the Hafsid Caliph of Ifriqiya between 1490 and 1494.

Abu Yahya Zakariya Hafsid
Preceded by Abd al-Mu'min	Caliph of Ifriqiya; 1490–1494	Succeeded by Muhammad IV
