= Santorcaz =

- Municipality
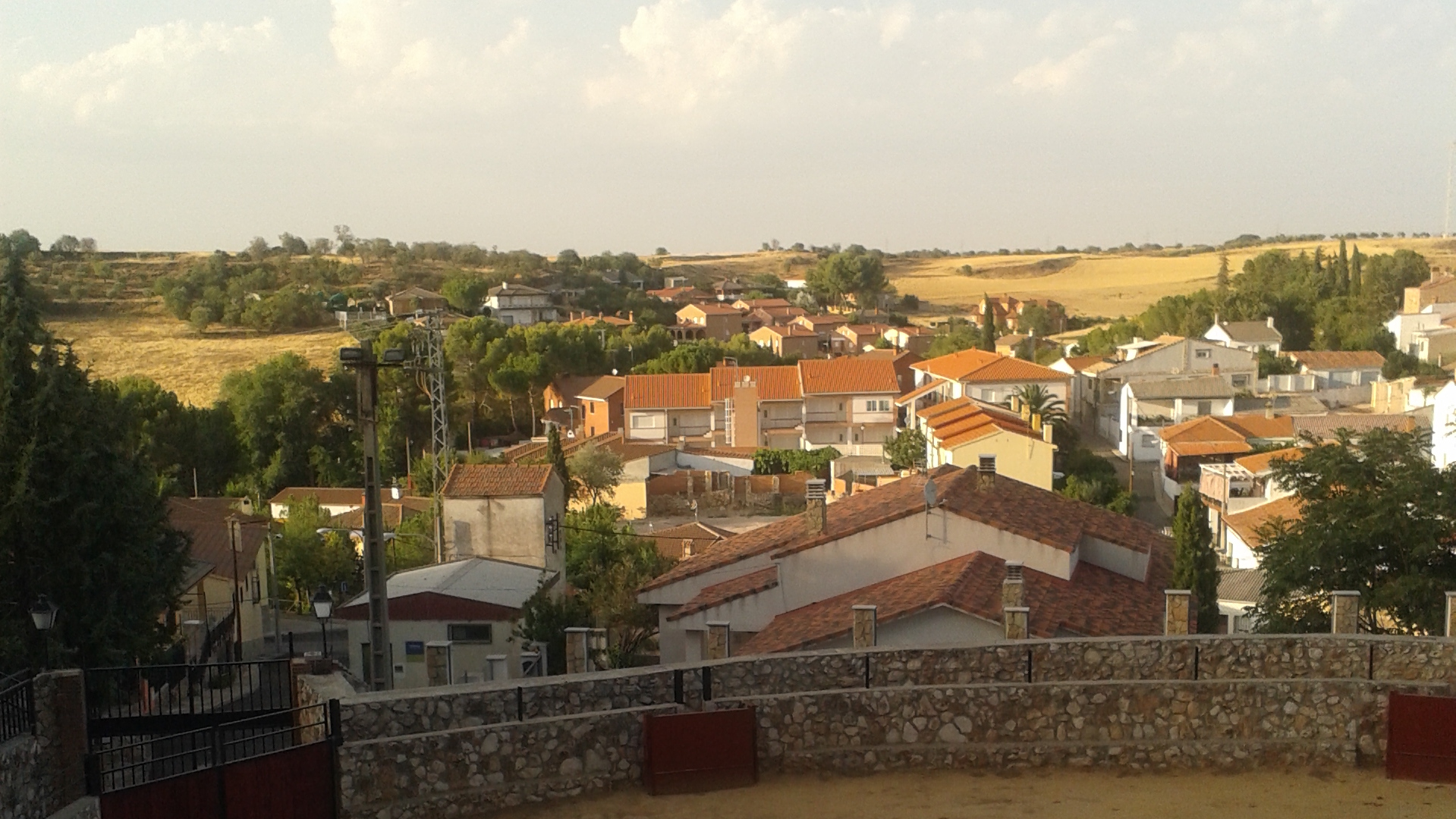

- Flag Coat of arms

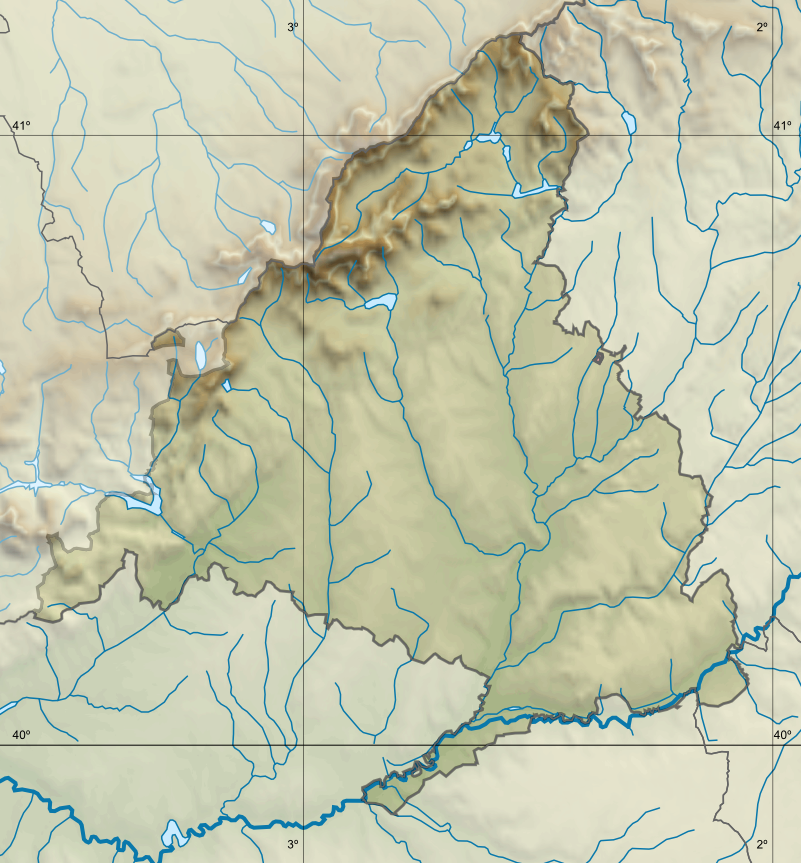
- Location within Community of Madrid Location within Spain
- Coordinates: 40°28′29″N 3°13′48″W
- Country: Spain
- Autonomous community: Community of Madrid

Government
  - Mayor: Raúl Caraballo

Area
  - Total: 28.14 km^{2} (10.86 sq mi)
- Elevation: 878 m (2,881 ft)

Population (2025-01-01)
  - Total: 1,011
  - Density: 35.93/km^{2} (93.05/sq mi)
- Demonym: Torcuatos
- Time zone: UTC+1 (CET)
  - Summer (DST): UTC+2 (CEST)
- Postal code: 28818
- Website: Official website

Santorcaz is a town and municipality in the Community of Madrid, Spain. It was built on a Bronze Age settlement and became a town in 1486.

== Location ==
Santorcaz is located on the moors rising up to the left (southern) bank of the Henares. The thalweg of the main hydrographic feature of the municipality, the Anchuelo creek, marks the lowest altitude of the municipality (around 780 metres above sea level).

== History ==
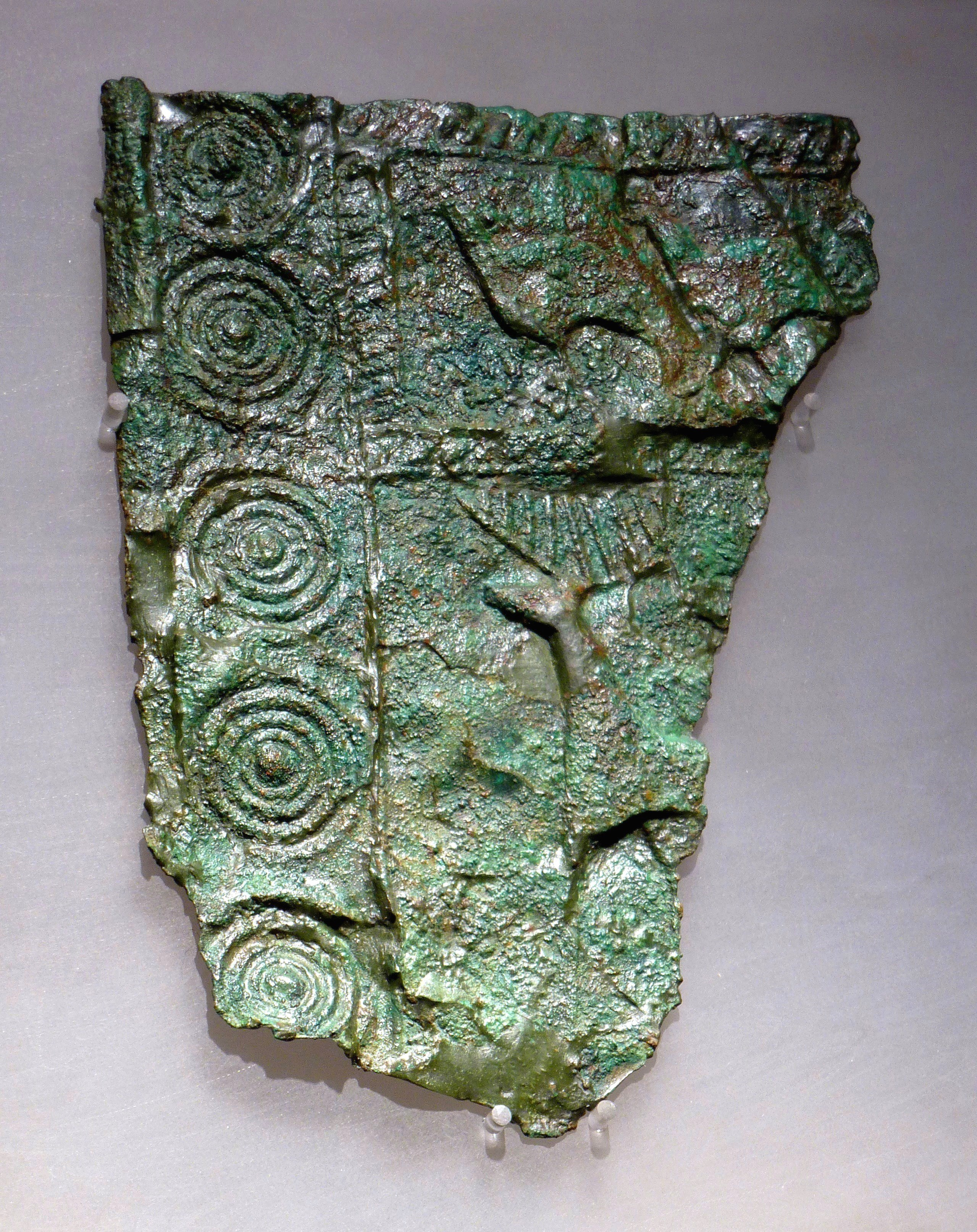
Carpetanian bronze plaque found at Llano de la Horca (Regional Archaeological Museum of the Community of Madrid)

Located some metres north of the housing at the opposite side of the M-213 road, the Llano de la Horca site hosts a Late Iron Age Carpetanian oppidum (3rd century-1st century BCE), built over an older Bronze Age occupation phase.

In 1129, Santorcaz was donated along with other places attached to the land of Alcalá, to Archbishop Raymond of Toledo. It was granted township in 1486. In the 1500s, bullfighting was common in the town however due to a Papal decree from Pope Gregory XIII in 1575 that bullfighting was not to be carried out on holy days (which came about due to local pressure against a previous total ban on bullfighting), the practice was suppressed in Santorcaz due to locals disregarding it. The effects of the Succession War plunged the town into a dire state in 1706. The town underwent French military occupation during the Peninsular War. During a formal survey, it was noted that Santorcaz was supplied by water from a fountain which had no records of when it was constructed. This was later restored by the Community of Madrid due to it having a risk of collapse because of a lack of maintenance.

The opening of the road from Madrid to the Royal Site of La Isabela passing near the town fostered some economic recovery after 1817. Sights include the church of San Torcuato and the annexed castle of Torremocha (14th century).
