= Pedro Navarro =

Navarrese military engineer (c.1460–1528)

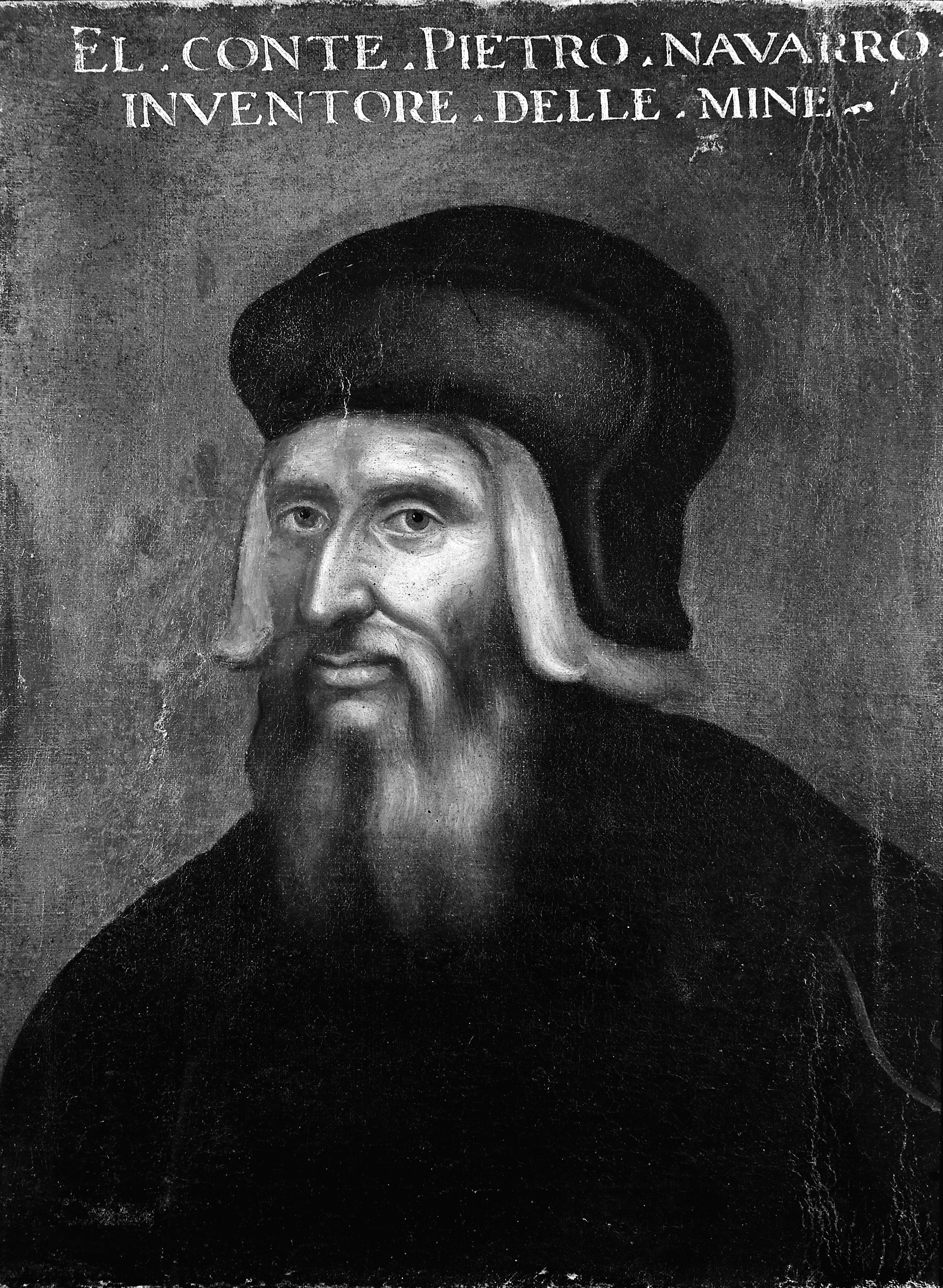
- Portrait at the Regional Military Museum of Burgos
- Born: c. 1460; Garde? (Kingdom of Navarre)
- Died: 28 August 1528; Naples, Kingdom of Naples, Spain
- Military career
- Allegiance: Spain (1500–1512); France (1515–1528)
- Branch: Engineering, Infantry, Artillery, Navy
- Rank: General
- Conflicts: Italian Wars

Pedro Navarro, Count of Oliveto (c. 1460 – 28 August 1528) was a Navarrese military engineer and general who participated in the War of the League of Cambrai. At the Battle of Ravenna in 1512, he commanded the Spanish and Papal infantry, but was captured by the French. In the service of Francis I of France, he would supervise the French crossing of the Alps before the Battle of Novara in 1513.

He is widely regarded as the inventor of modern siege mines.

== Biography ==
Navarro was probably born at Garde in the Navarrese valley of Roncal. Little is known of his early life. He began his military career in the service of Cardinal Juan de Aragon prior to 1485. He fought against the Barbary pirates in Italy as a condottiero. Enlisted by Gonzalo Fernández de Córdoba in 1499, he took part in the capture and siege of Cephalonia in 1500. He invented the landmine, and his skillful employment of mines allowed for the breaching of the walls of the Turkish fortress. He continued in the service of Córdoba and went on to Naples, and defended Canosa in 1502 and Taranto in 1503 against the French. He supervised the construction of the field fortifications at the Battle of Cerignola, that enabled Córdoba to win his battle with Louis d'Armagnac, Duke of Nemours on 28 April. He played a major role in the Spanish victory at the Garigliano River on 29 December 1503 and was created count of Oliveto for his services.

After returning to Spain in 1507, he had a falling out with Córdoba, who retired from the battlefields. Navarro took part in the North Africa expeditions of Cardinal Cisneros. Navarro assisted in the capture of the Peñón de Vélez de la Gomera in 1508 by employing a floating battery of his own design during the battle. He went on to fight at the capture of Mazalquivir (Mers-el-Kébir) and Oran in 1509. Navarro personally led the Spanish forces during the conquest of Bougie (Béjaïa), Algiers, Tunis, Tlemcen, and Tripoli in 1510. He enlisted in the service of Ramon de Cardona viceroy of Naples and returned to Italy upon hearing of a new war against France in 1511. He constructed a number of light carts mounted with light artillery pieces in organ gun shape designed to break up enemy formations in 1512.

Despite his efforts, the Spanish Papal army was defeated in the Battle of Ravenna on 11 April 1512, and he was captured by the French, whose Gaston de Foix had died at the battle. Ferdinand II of Aragon refused to ransom him, and Navarro eventually entered the service of Francis I of France. Navarro went on to accompany the French armies in their campaign against Milan (1515–1516), and he fought alongside King Francis against the Swiss at the battle of Marignano (13–14 September 1515). Continuing in French service, he fought at the Battle of Bicocca (27 April 1522) and was taken prisoner when the Spaniards under Prospero Colonna and Fernando d'Ávalos captured Genoa in May of the same year.

Released after the Treaty of Madrid (14 January 1526), he returned to French service, again being taken prisoner while serving the new French expedition in Italy (1527). He died, aged around 68, in the prison of Castel Nuovo at Naples at the end of August 1528, possibly smothered with a pillow.
