= Spanish conquest of Oran (1509) =

Military campaign in North Africa

Conquest of Oran
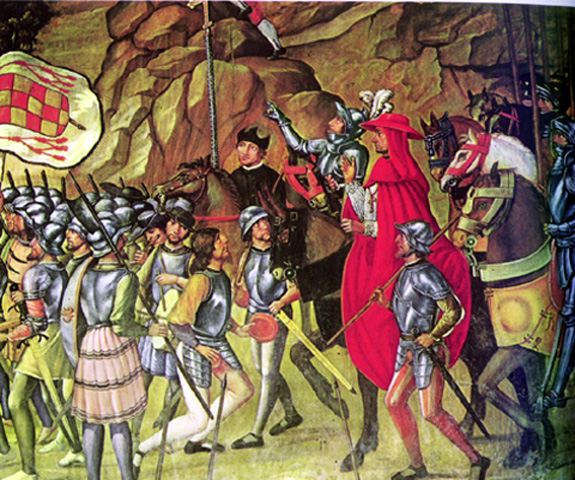
- Cisneros entering Oran, by Juan de Borgoña.
Date	May 1509
Location	Oran
Result	Spanish victory

Belligerents
(Crown of Castile) Spanish Empire	Kingdom of Tlemcen

Commanders and leaders
(Crown of Castile) Cardinal Cisneros (Crown of Castile) Pedro Navarro	Unknown

Strength
8,000–12,000 infantrymen 3,000–4,000 cavalrymen 80 ships 10 galleys	12,000

Casualties and losses
Less than 30	4,000

The conquest of Oran by the Spanish Empire took place on May 1509, when an army led by Pedro Navarro on behalf of the Cardinal Cisneros seized the North African city, which was controlled by the Kingdom of Tlemcen (Zayyanid dynasty).

== Background ==
In 1505, the Spanish captured the city of Mers-El-Kébir after a successful expedition against the Zayyanids. In 1507, the Zayyanids ambushed the city of Mers-el-Kébir, with about 11,000 cavalry, gaining a decisive victory against the Spanish forces.

== Siege ==
Preparations for the expedition began in September 1508. The Crown invested 39.6 million maravedis in the expedition. In comparison, the armada to Castilla del Oro in 1514 would cost 14 million and the armada of Maluco led by Hernando de Magallanes cost 8.35 million.

A fleet left port from Cartagena on 16 May and sailed towards Mers el-Kebir, a city located near Oran and already (since 1505) under Spanish control. The fleet had 80 naos and 10 galleys, plus additional small boats. They carried around 8,000–12,000 infantry-men and 3,000-4,000 cavalry-men. The army spent the night of 17 May in Mers el Kebir. The Christians stormed the city of Oran, then part of the Kingdom of Tlemcen, combining the use of the fleet with a ground assault on 18 May. After breaking through the walls of the city the casualties numbered less than 30 on the assaulting side, while the 12,000 defenders suffered 4,000 casualties.

On 20 May, Cisneros entered the city, already conquered.

The city remained a part of the Spanish Empire until 1708, when it was seized by the Ottoman Dey of Algiers taking advantage of the War of the Spanish Succession. The city was conquered again by the Spanish in 1732. After the 1790 Oran earthquake, they abandoned Oran and Mers el-Kebir in 1792.

== Bibliography ==
- Fernández Duro, Cesáreo (1895), Armada Española (desde la unión de los reinos de Castilla y Aragón. Tomo I, 1476-1559) (PDF) (in Spanish), Madrid: Imprenta Real
- Sánchez Doncel, Gregorio (1991), Presencia de España en Orán, 1509-1792 (in Spanish), Toledo: Estudio Teológico de San Ildefonso, ISBN 84-600-7614-8
