= Juan de Lezcano =

Spanish admiral (fl. 1490–1518)

Juan López de Lezcano
- Born: Gipuzkoa, Kingdom of Castile
- Died: Unknown
- Military career
- Allegiance: Spanish Empire
- Service years: 1490–1518
- Rank: Admiral
- Conflicts: Siege of the Castle of Saint George; Battle of Garigliano; Capture of Mers-el-Kébir

Juan López de Lezcano or Lazcano (fl. 1490–1518) was a Spanish admiral. He served during the reign of the Catholic Monarchs and the early reign of Charles V, Holy Roman Emperor. He was known as a successful and innovative commander in both sea and land, pioneering naval armour and other tactics.

== Biography ==
Born in Gipuzkoa, by 1490 he was serving in the Granada War. He later captured the pirate Juan de Cádiz and recognized the coast of the Kingdom of Tlemcen before the acquisition of the stronghold of Melilla. More famously, in 1500 he served under Gonzalo Fernández de Córdoba in the siege of the Castle of Saint George, replacing Galcerán de Requesens as main admiral of his army.

=== Italian Wars ===
During the Italian Wars of 1499–1504, he faced French admiral Prégent de Bidoux, who was harassing the coast of the Spanish territories with six ships. With four galleys, Lezcano chased him to the Venetian colony of Otranto, where Bidoux took refuge. Lezcano sent messengers demanding Bidoux to be handed over for capturing two Spanish ships, but the Venetians refused on the ground of neutrality and blocked the port with a chain. The Spanish admiral then had the chain broken, entered Otranto and forcefully took the two ships. Before it could escalate to a full assault, Pregent handed over all the prisoners he had and had his ships scuttled.

Later Pregent returned to the Spanish campaign with 35 ships, chasing Bernardo de Vilamarí to Ischia, but he had to turn away when Vilamarí, Lezcano and Ramón de Cardona came after with in a joined effort. They later blocked the port of Gaeta. Lezcano also participated in land warfare, especially the Battle of Garigliano, where he helped build the pontoon bridge used to cross the river. With the victory, the French were expelled from Naples. Lezcano also brought to Spain Prospero Colonna and his entourage including the captured Cesare Borgia.

=== Later career ===
During the capture of Mers-el-Kébir in 1505 by Ramón de Cardona, Lezcano commanded part of the fleet in an amphibious operation. In order to cover the landing of the troops, he and Flórez de Marquina brought three carracks armored with sacks of wool and algae and fitted with all possible artillery, including ribauldequin. Through this strategy, the ships got close to the citadel and attracted all the enemy fire while inflicting a heavy bombardment in turn. This was possibly the first tactical usage of naval armour.

In 1512 he escorted to Spain the English fleet led by Thomas Grey, Marquis of Dorsett, who intended to help the conquest of Navarra by King Ferdinand the Catholic. His death is unknown, but by 1518 he was still admiral when Charles V, Holy Roman Emperor and King of Spain took possession of the kingdom.

== Personal life ==
He married Leonor de Zúñiga y Navarra, whom he had a son with, Bernardino López de Lezcano.

== Bibliography ==
- Fernández Duro, Cesáreo (1895). Armada Española, desde la unión de los reinos de Castilla y Aragón, tomo I. Instituto de Historia Naval.
- Martín Gómez, Antonio L. (2000). El Gran Capitán: las Campañas del Duque de Terranova y Santángelo. Almena. ISBN 84-930713-1-5.
- Nicieza Forcelledo, Guillermo (2025). Almirantes del Imperio: los grandes comandantes de las Armadas españolas del siglo XVI. EDAF. ISBN 9788441444430.
