= Battle of Mers-el-Kébir (1501) =

- Part of Portuguese colonial campaigns
Date	Late July 1501
Location	Mers-el-Kébir, Kingdom of Tlemcen
Result	Zayyanid victory

Belligerents
Portuguese Empire	Kingdom of Tlemcen

Commanders and leaders
John of Meneses, 1st Count of Tarouca	Abu Abdallah IV

Strength
3,500 soldiers 35 ships	Unknown

Casualties and losses
Heavy	Unknown

The Battle of Mers-el-Kébir occurred in 1501 and was a failed attempt to capture Mers-el-Kébir by the Portuguese.

== Background ==
After the conquest of Granada in 1492, Spain began establishing their rule on the coasts of Algeria and Tunis. Portugal could not afford to be left behind if they did not launch campaigns in Morocco. Portugal sought to expand more in Morocco as it would be easier, cheaper, and more convenient than traveling to the East. Another issue was to deal with the Barbary corsairs who were ravaging the coasts of Spain and the Ottomans, who were having a war with the Venetians. The Venetians sought Portugal's help; the Portuguese king, Manuel I agreed to help.

== Battle ==
In late July 1501, Manuel dispatched a fleet of 35 ships consisting of 3,500 men led by Joao de Meneses to seize Mers-el-Kébir and establish a garrison there. The Portuguese armada faced a storm that did not allow them to disembark easily and struggled for 8 days. The Moors and the Arabs, aware of the upcoming invasion, began preparations to oppose them. They gathered many men to the shores. The Muslims predicted the landing point where the Portuguese would disembark. The Portuguese landed but found great resistance, forcing them to retreat. Those who could not escape were captured and sold as slaves in Oran.

== Sources ==
- Malyn Newitt (2004), A History of Portuguese Overseas Expansion 1400–1668.
- Sanjay Subrahmanyam (1997), The Career and Legend of Vasco Da Gama.
- Ministère des travaux publics (1890), Ports maritimes de la France, Vol 8, Part I.
- Jean Joseph Léandre Bargès (1887), Complément de l'histoire des Beni-Zeiyan, rois de Tlemcen.
- L. Didier (1927), Histoire d'Oran période de 1501 à 1550.
