= Mers El Kébir =

Mers El Kébir بلدية المرسى الكبير Baladiyya al-Marsā al-Kabīr
- Municipality
- Commune of Mers El Kébir
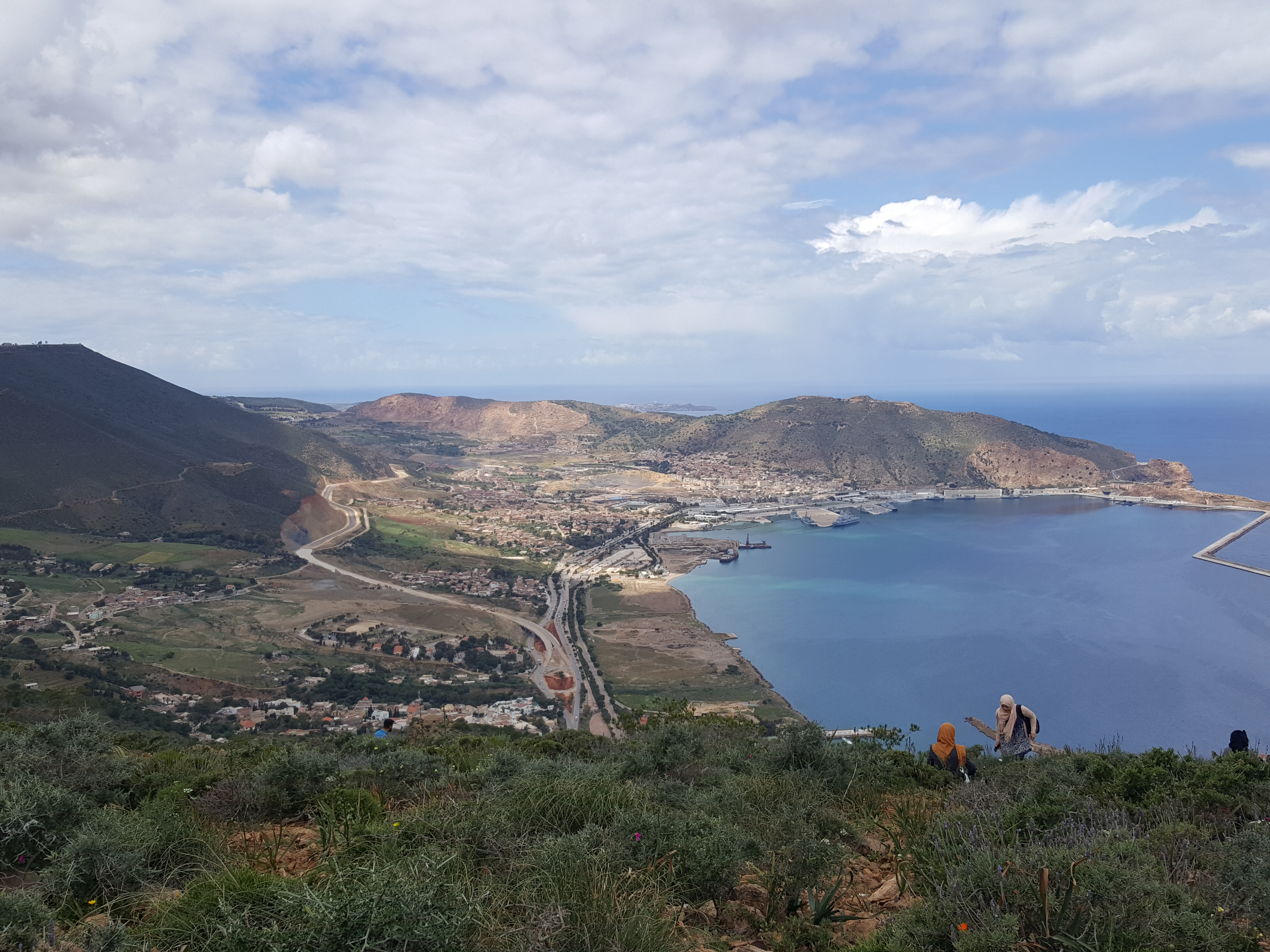
- View of Mers El Kébir

- Location of Mers El Kébir within Oran Province

- Location of Mers El Kébir within Algeria
- Coordinates: 35°43′43″N 0°42′25″W
- Country: Algeria
- Province: Oran
- District: Aïn El Turk

Government
  - PMA Seats: 9

Area
  - Total: 10.98 km^{2} (4.24 sq mi)
- Elevation: 0 m (0 ft)

Population (2006)
  - Total: 16,950
  - Density: 1,544/km^{2} (3,998/sq mi)
- Time zone: UTC+01 (CET)
- Postal code: 31310
- ONS code: 3115

Mers El Kébir (Arabic: المرسى الكبير, romanized: al-Marsā al-Kabīr, lit. 'The Great Harbor') is a port on the Mediterranean Sea, near Oran in Oran Province, northwest Algeria. It is famous for the attack on the French fleet in 1940, in the Second World War.

== History ==
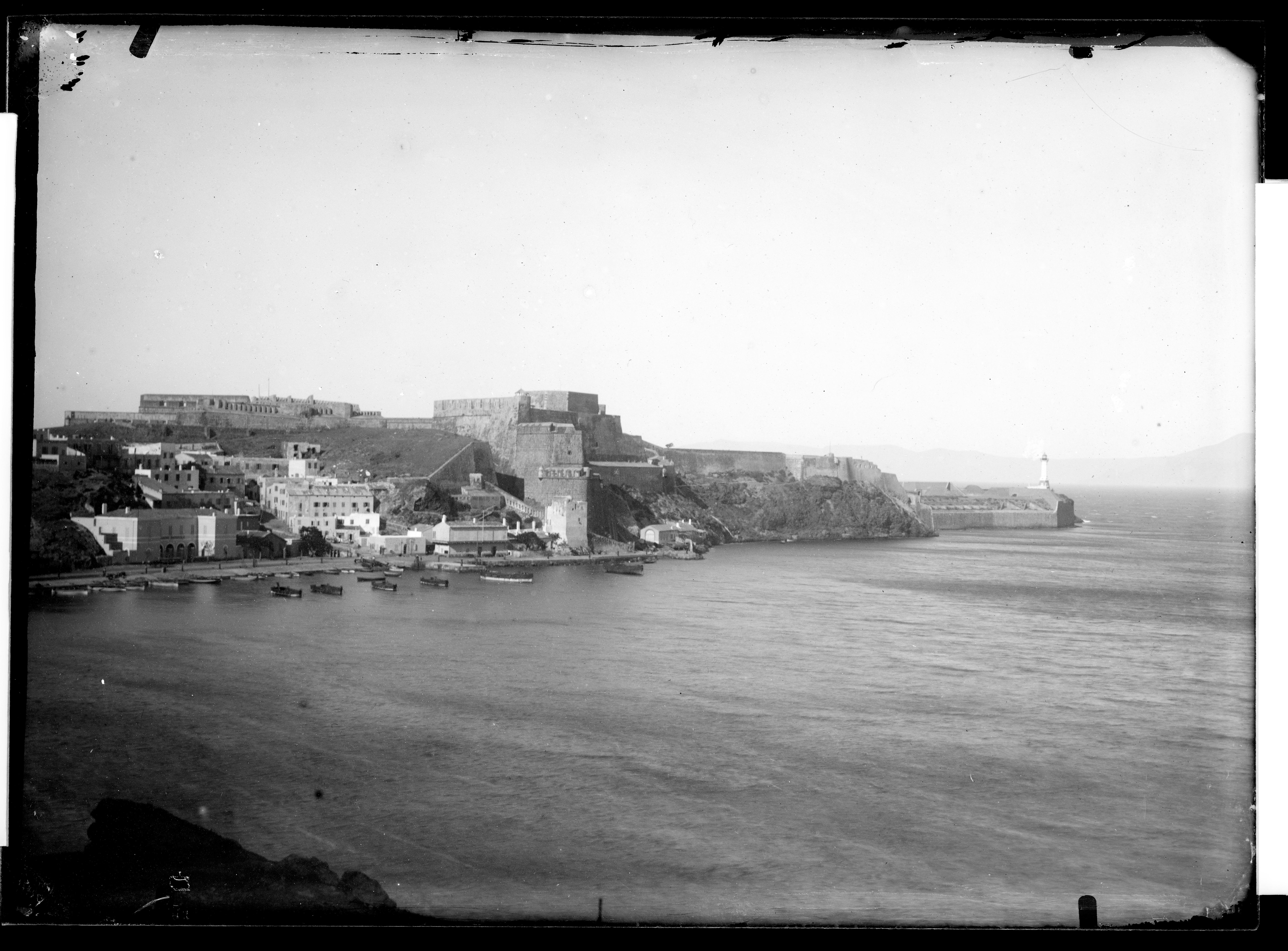
Mers El Kébir, 1881 by Eugène Trutat, French photographer.

Originally a Phoenician port, it was called Portus Divinus under the Roman presence, Mers-el-Kébir became an Almohad naval arsenal in the 12th century, fell under the rulers of the Kingdom of Tlemcen in the 13th century, and eventually became a centre of pirate activity around 1492. It was fought over by the Ottoman Turks, Portuguese (defeated in the 1501 Battle of Mers El Kebir by Abu Abdallah IV) and Spanish (defeated in the 1507 Battle of Mers-el-Kébir by Abu Abd Allah V).

The Spanish, who named it Mazalquivir, captured it in 1505 under Cardinal Cisneros. Mazalquivir was used as a base to capture neighbouring Oran in 1509. The Spanish held both cities until 1708, when they were driven out by Bey Mustapha Ben Youssef (also known as Bouchelaghem). The Spanish returned in 1732 when the armada of the Duke of Montemar was victorious in the Battle of Aïn-el-Turk and again took Oran and Mazalquivir. The Spanish held both cities until 1792, when they were sold by King Carlos IV to the Dey of Algiers following a siege by the forces of the Dey.

The French occupied it in 1830, and renamed it Saint André de Mers-el-Kébir, enhancing the port in 1868 with an eponymous lighthouse; the latter was destroyed in World War II.

=== World War II ===
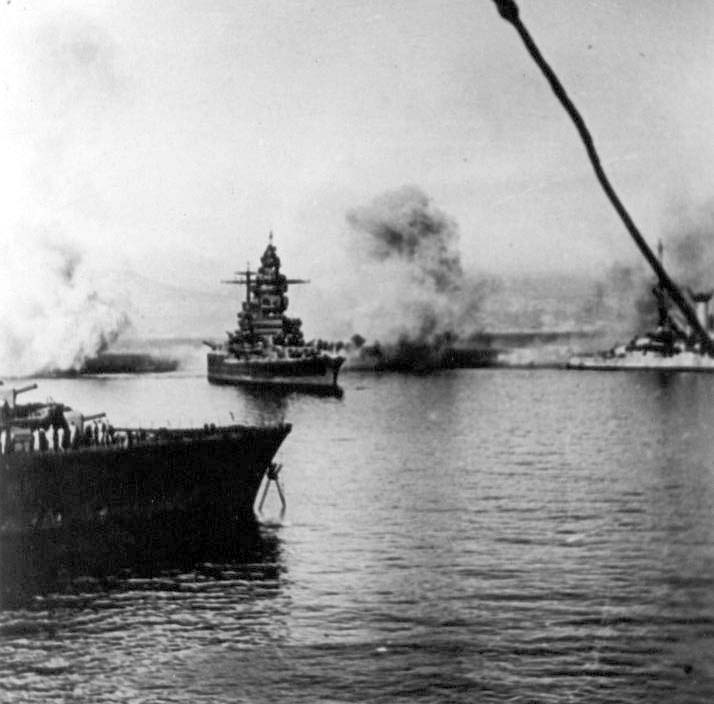
Attack on Mers El Kébir, 3 July 1940

Following the fall of France in 1940, a French fleet became holed up in the port. On 3 July 1940, Force H of the Royal Navy, led by Vice-admiral Sir James Somerville, attacked the fleet at Mers-el-Kébir after its commanders refused to accede to any of Somerville's demands which were designed to ensure it would not join forces with Nazi Germany like Vichy France. The attack was successful, with Force H destroying or damaging several French warships. The attack, which led to Vichy France severing its relations with Britain, demonstrated to the world that the British would fight on against the Axis powers.

=== Post World War II ===
After World War II, France used its naval base at Mers-el-Kébir to assist in atomic tests, the base was substantially developed by the French in 1953. The Évian Accords of 18 March 1962, which recognised Algerian independence, allowed France to maintain its base for 15 years; however, France withdrew five years later in 1967.

Google Earth imagery has confirmed that a sizeable number of the Algerian National Navy use the naval base at Mers El Kébir. Including the navy's Kilo-class submarine fleet of six boats; as well as other frigates and corvettes.

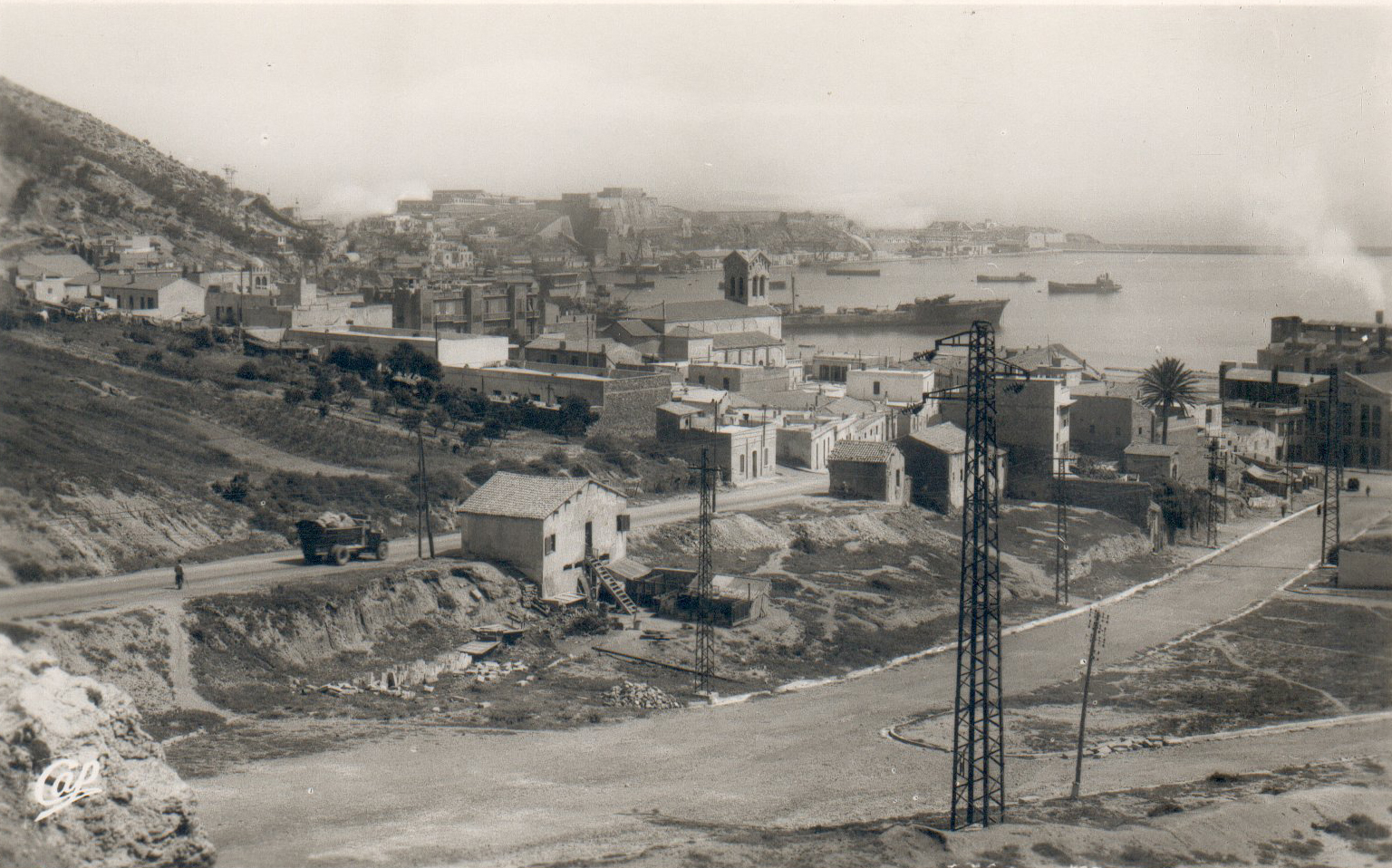
Old photograph of Cimetiere street

== Notable people ==
- Paul Maurice Pallary (1869–1942), malacologist and arachnologist, born in Mers El Kébir

== See also ==
- European enclaves in North Africa before 1830
- Operation Torch
- Presidio
- US Naval Bases North Africa
