= Abu Abdallah IV =

Abu Abdallah Tabiti
- Sultan

Sultan of Tlemcen
- Reign: 1475–1505
- Predecessor: Abu Tashufin III
- Successor: Abu Abdallah V
- Died: 1505; Tlemcen
- Issue: Abu Abdallah V Emir Mouley el-Messaoud; Emir Abou Zeid Abd el-Rahman; Princess Aicha
- House: Zayyanid
- Religion: Islam

Abu Abdallah Tabiti (or Thabet) or Abu Abdallah(Mohammed) IV (Arabic: أبو عبد الله محمد الرابع الثابتي) (ruled 1475–1505) was a Sultan of the Kingdom of Tlemcen in Algeria. He was a son of Abu Abdallah III and was succeeded by his son Abu Abdallah V. During his reign he defeated Portugal in the battle of Mers El Kebir (1501) and the Oran fatwa were made at the same year of his reigns end.

Abu Abdallah IV Zayyanid
Preceded by Abu Tashufin III	Sultan of Tlemcen; 1475–1505	Succeeded by Abu Abdallah V
