= Francisco Jiménez de Cisneros =

Spanish cardinal and statesman (1436–1517)

Venerable Francisco Jiménez de Cisneros O.F.M.
- Archbishop of Toledo; Primate of Spain
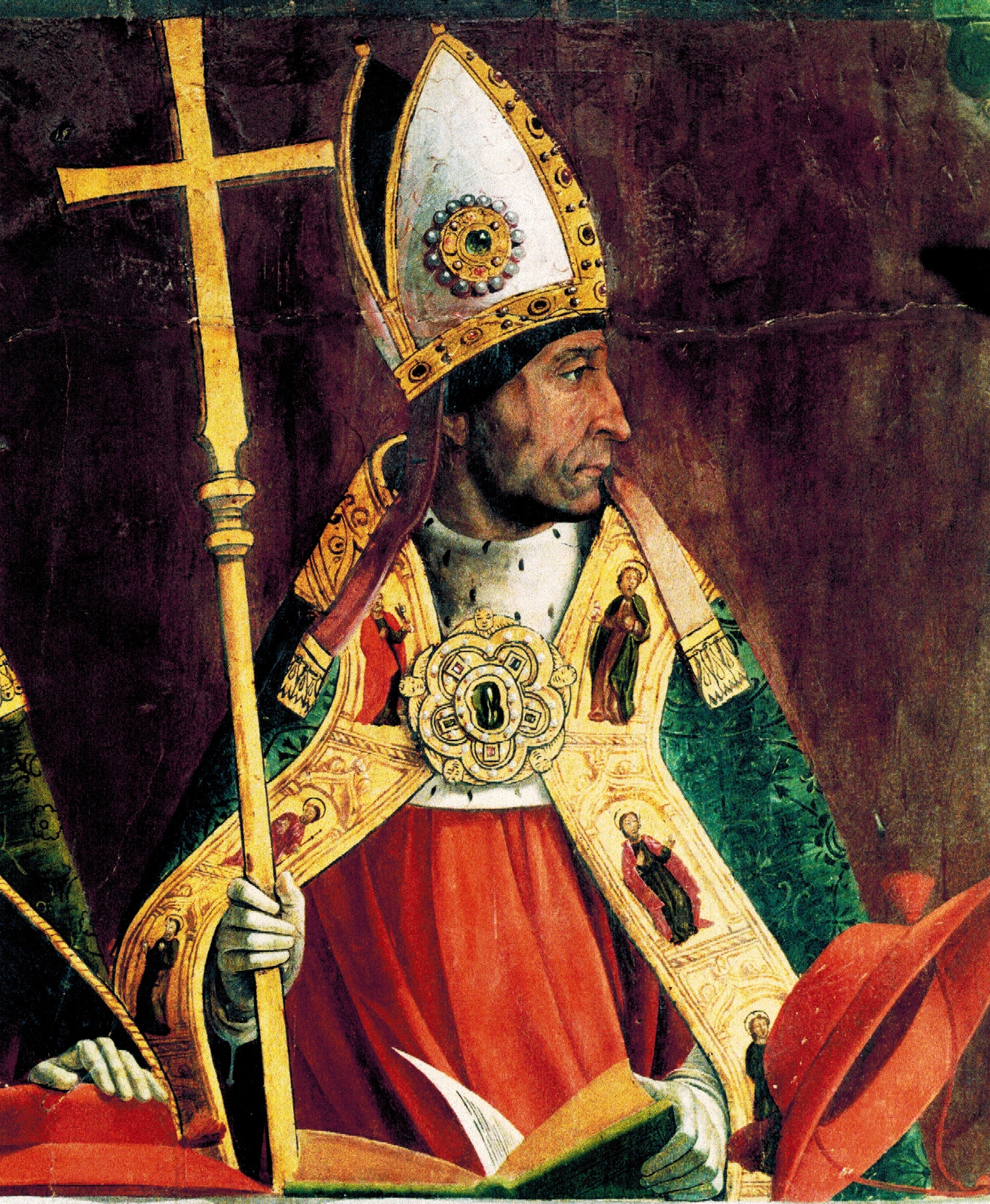
- Cardinal Cisneros by Juan de Borgoña, c. 1514, Chapter House of the Cathedral of Toledo
- Church: Roman Catholic Church
- Archdiocese: Toledo
- Province: Toledo
- Appointed: 20 February 1495
- Term ended: 8 November 1517
- Predecessor: Pedro González de Mendoza
- Successor: William de Croÿ

Orders
- Consecration: 11 October 1495 by Hernando de Talavera
- Created cardinal: 17 May 1507 by Pope Julius II
- Rank: Cardinal-Priest

Personal details
- Born: Gonzalo Jiménez de Cisneros; 1436 Torrelaguna, Crown of Castile
- Died: November 8, 1517 (aged 80–81) Roa de Duero, Spain
- Buried: Alcalá de Henares Cathedral
- Education: University of Salamanca

- Coat of arms

Sainthood
- Venerated in: Catholic Church
- Title as Saint: Venerable

Governor of the Kingdom of Castile
- In office 23 January 1516 – 8 November 1517
- Monarch: Joanna I
- Preceded by: Ferdinand II of Aragon
- Succeeded by: Charles I

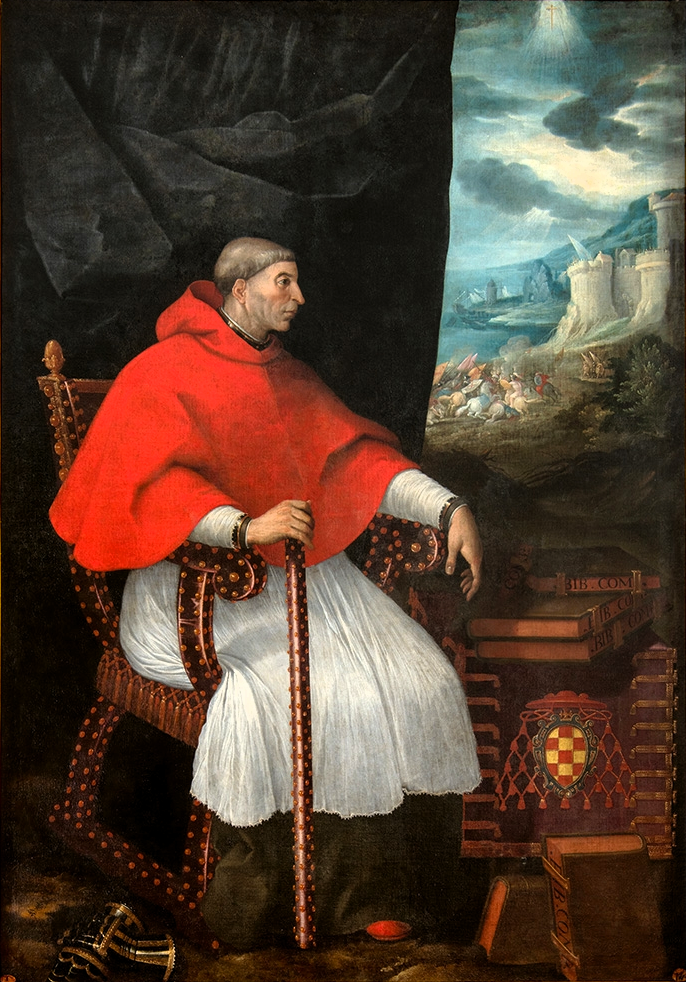
Cardinal Francisco Jiménez de Cisneros (1604), by Eugenio Caxés.

Francisco Jiménez de Cisneros, (Note: Cardinal Cisneros is known by many name variations. His birth name was Gonzalo, which he dropped in favour of Francisco when he converted to a Franciscan friar, and kept the rest of his life. It is sometimes spelled Gonzales or González (a surname meaning "son of Gonzalo") which is an error. Jiménez is the modern Spanish spelling variation of the original Ximenes (or Ximénez/Ximenez). Often the "é" is dropped in favor of "e" for English readers, see for example the title of Erika Rummel's 1999 book. The name "Cardinal Cisneros" is often used.) OFM (1436 – 8 November 1517) was a Spanish cardinal, religious figure, and statesman. Starting from humble beginnings he rose to the heights of power, becoming a religious reformer, twice regent of Spain, Cardinal, Grand Inquisitor, promoter of the Crusades in North Africa, and founder of the University of Alcalá. Among his intellectual accomplishments during the Renaissance in Spain, he is best known for funding the Complutensian Polyglot Bible, the first polyglot version of the entire Bible, which was mass produced using Johannes Gutenberg's printing press. He also edited and published the first printed editions of the missal (in 1500) and the breviary (in 1502) of the Mozarabic Rite, and established a chapel with a college of thirteen priests to celebrate the Mozarabic Liturgy of the Hours and Eucharist each day in the Toledo Cathedral.

Cardinal Cisneros' life coincided with, and greatly influenced, a dynamic period in the history of Spain during the reign of Ferdinand II of Aragon and Isabella I of Castile. During this time Spain underwent many significant changes, leading it into its prominent role in the Spanish Golden Age (1500–1700). Modern historian John Elliott said as far as any particular policies that can be attributed to Spain's rise, they were those of King Ferdinand and Cardinal Cisneros.

== Rise to power ==
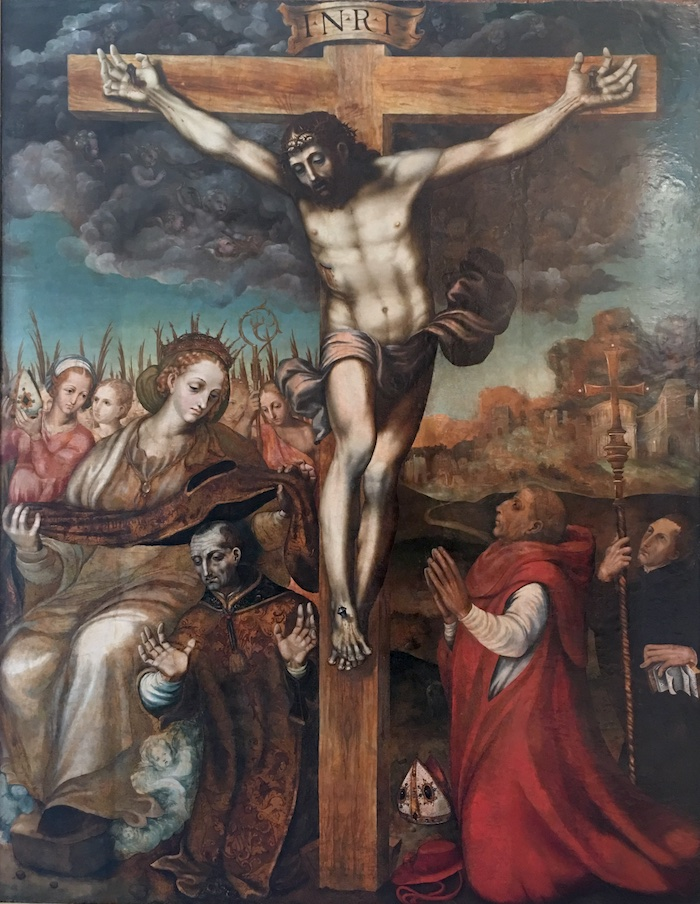
Cardinal Cisneros depicted to the right of Jesus crucified on the cross, by Pedro de Castañeda, 1553

He was born Gonzalo Jiménez de Cisneros in Torrelaguna in Castile in 1436, the son of hidalgos Alfonso Jiménez de Cisneros and wife María de la Torre, from the villa of Cisneros, Palencia. He studied in the Studium generale at Alcalá de Henares and also in the University of Salamanca, where in 1456 he obtained a bachelor's degree in law. In 1459 he traveled to Rome to work as a consistorial advocate, where he attracted the notice of Pope Pius II. He returned to Spain in 1465 carrying an "executive" letter from the Pope giving him possession of the first vacant benefice. That turned out to be Uceda. However, Alfonso Carrillo de Acuña, the Archbishop of Toledo and Primate of Spain, refused to accept the letter, wishing instead to bestow the benefice upon one of his own followers. When Cisneros insisted, he was thrown in prison, first at Uceda and afterwards in the fortress of Santorcaz. For six years, Cisneros held out for his claim, free to leave at any time if he would give it up, but at length in 1480 Carrillo relented at Cisneros' strength of conviction and gave him a benefice. Fearing further reprisals, Cisneros traded it almost at once for a chaplaincy at Sigüenza, under Cardinal Pedro González de Mendoza, the bishop of Sigüenza, who shortly after appointed him vicar general of his diocese.

At Sigüenza, Cisneros won praise for his work and he seemed to be on the sure road to success among the secular clergy, when in 1484 at the late age of forty-eight he abruptly decided to become a Franciscan friar. Giving up all his worldly belongings, and changing his baptismal name, Gonzalo, for that of Francisco, he entered the Franciscan friary of San Juan de los Reyes, recently founded by Ferdinand II of Aragon and Isabella I of Castile at Toledo. Not content with the normal lack of comforts for a friar, he voluntarily slept on the bare ground, wore a cilice, doubled his fasts, and generally denied himself with enthusiasm; indeed throughout his whole life, even when at the height of power, his private life was rigorously ascetic.

He retired to the isolated friary of Our Lady of Castañar and built a rough hut in the neighboring woods, in which he lived at times as an anchorite, and later became guardian of a friary at Salzeda. Meanwhile, Mendoza (now Archbishop of Toledo) had not forgotten him, and in 1492 recommended him to Isabella as her confessor. Jiménez accepted the position on condition that he might still live in his community and follow the religious life, only appearing at court when sent for. The post was politically important, for Isabella took counsel from her confessor not only in religious affairs but also matters of state. Isabella's Alhambra Decree, which expelled the Jews from Spain, followed almost immediately upon Cisneros' appointment as her confessor. Cisneros' severe sanctity soon won him considerable influence over Isabella, and in 1494 he was appointed Minister Provincial of the order for Spain.

Cardinal Mendoza died in 1495, and Isabella had secretly procured a papal bull nominating Cisneros to Mendoza's Archdiocese of Toledo, the richest and most powerful in Spain. With this office was also given the office of chancellor of Castile. Isabella tried to surprise him by presenting the bull as a gift in person, but Cisneros did not react as she had hoped. Instead, he fled her presence, and ran away, only to be overtaken by Isabella's messengers several miles outside of Madrid and convinced to return to court for further discussion. Cisneros resisted the appointment for six months and reluctantly agreed only after a second papal bull ordered him to accept. Despite his lavish new position, Cisneros personally still maintained a simple life; although a message from Rome required him to live in a style befitting his rank, the outward pomp only concealed his private asceticism.

== Reform, revolt, and crusade ==
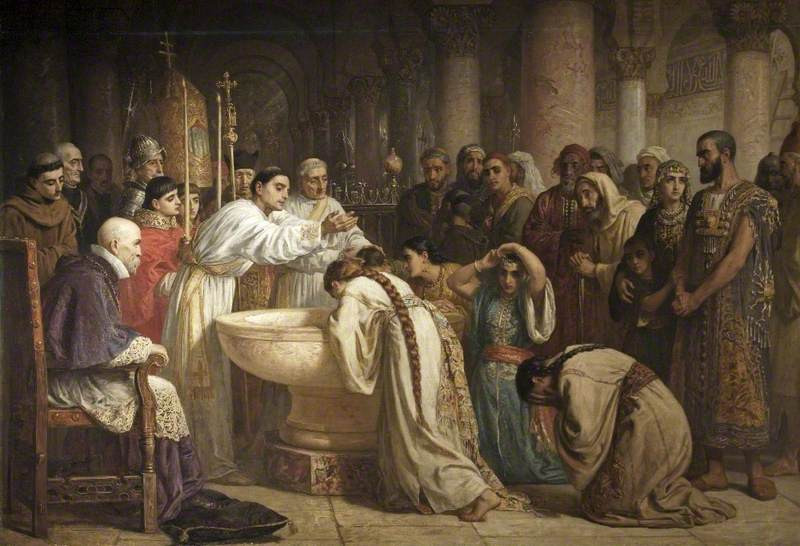
The Moorish Proselytes of Archbishop Ximenes, Granada, 1500 by Edwin Long (1829–1891)

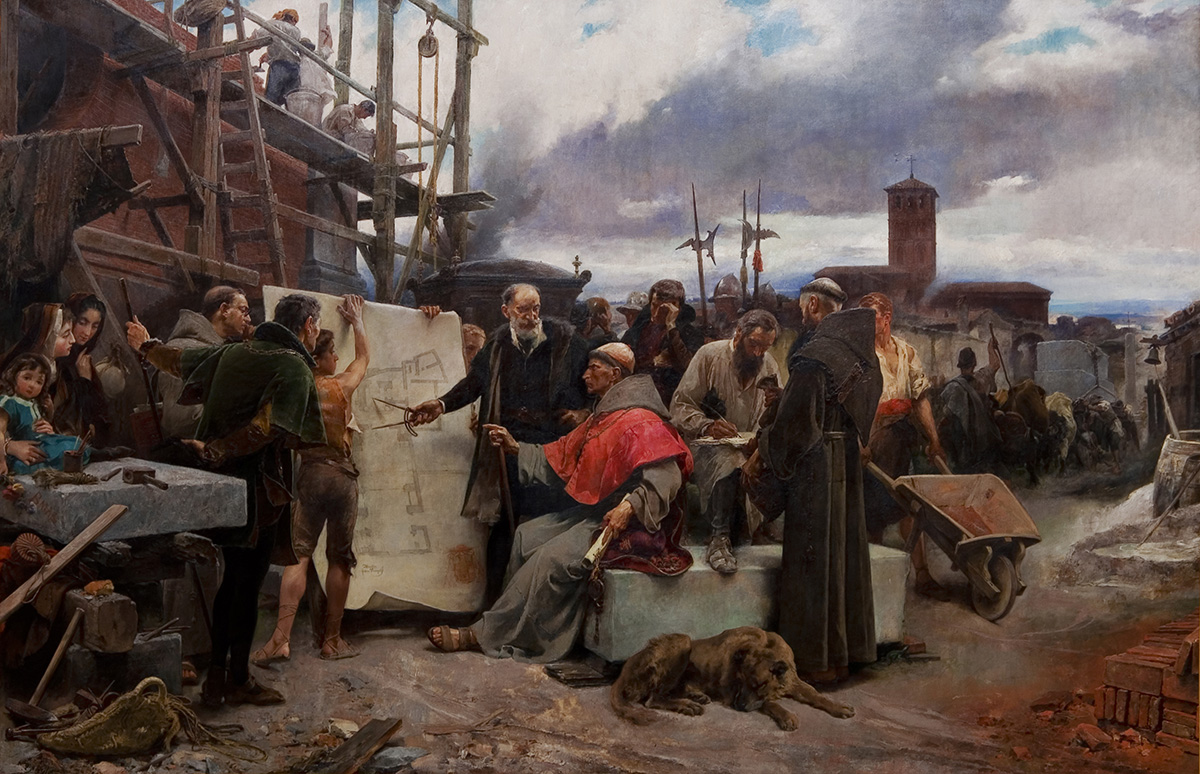
Cisneros (sitting) visits the construction of the Hospital of the Charity. Sanctuary of the Charity of Illescas (Toledo) by Alejandro Ferrant (1844–1917)

From his new position Cisneros set about reforming the Franciscan order in Spain. The ordained friars had to become celibate, giving up the practice of concubinage. They had to reside in the parish where they were supposed to work, attend confession, and preach every Sunday. There was intense opposition. By 1498 the reforms were expanded to include not only Franciscans but other mendicant orders as well. The Minister General of the order himself came from Rome to attempt to temper the archbishop's strict reforms, but Cisneros, backed by the influence of a strong Queen, managed to impose them.

In 1499 Cisneros accompanied the court of the Spanish Inquisition to Granada, and there interfered with Hernando de Talavera's efforts to peacefully convert its Muslim inhabitants to Christianity. Talavera favored slow conversion by explaining to the Moors, in their language, the truths of the Catholic religion, but Cisneros said that this was "giving pearls to pigs", and proceeded with forced mass conversion. He ordered the public burning of all Arabic manuscripts that could be found in Granada — 5,000 is the lowest figure the contemporary sources give — except those dealing with medicine.

The indignation of the unconverted Mudéjares (i.e., Iberian Muslims living in Christian territories) over this gross violation of the Alhambra treaty swelled into the open revolt known as the First Rebellion of the Alpujarras. The revolt was violently suppressed and they were given a choice — contrary to the terms of Granada's surrender — of baptism or exile. The majority accepted baptism and by 1500 Cisneros reported that "there is now no one in the city who is not a Christian, and all the mosques are churches". However, he had created a problem that would only end with the expulsion from Spain of Moriscos in 1609.

On 26 November 1504 Isabella died. Ferdinand claimed regency against his son-in-law Philip I of Castile, and Cisneros helped mediate the dispute in the Treaty of Villafafila which left Philip as king of Castile. When Philip died in 1506, Ferdinand was in Naples and Cisneros set up a regent government in his absence, and stopped a plot by a group of high nobles to take over the throne. In return for his loyalty, Ferdinand made Cisneros Grand Inquisitor for Castile and León in 1507 and prevailed on the Pope to give him a Cardinal's hat.

The next great event in the cardinal's life was the attack against the Moorish city of Oran in North Africa, in which his religious zeal coincided with Ferdinand's prospect for political and material gain. A preliminary expedition, equipped at Cisneros' expense, captured the port of Mers El Kébir in 1505. In 1509, a strong force accompanied by the cardinal in person set sail for Africa, and in one day the wealthy city was taken by storm. Cisneros returned to Spain and attempted to recover from Ferdinand the expenses of the expedition, but Ferdinand was content with taking Oran and because of his greater interest in Italy he would not support Cisneros' plans for a larger North African crusade and conquest.

== Final years ==
On 23 January 1516 Ferdinand died, leaving Cisneros as regent of Castile for Charles (afterward Charles V, Holy Roman Emperor), then a youth of sixteen in the Netherlands. Though Cisneros at once took firm hold of the reins of government, and ruled in a determined and even autocratic manner, the turbulent Castilian nobility and the jealous intriguing Flemish councilors for Charles combined to render Cisneros' position peculiarly difficult. Cisneros acceded to Charles' desire to be proclaimed king; he secured the person of Charles' younger brother Ferdinand (afterward Ferdinand I, Holy Roman Emperor); he fixed the seat of the courts at Madrid; and he established a standing army by drilling the citizens of the major towns. During his regency, he dealt with the Spanish conquest of Navarre. He is remembered for ordering the demolition of most of the fortresses of Navarre (e.g., the Castle of Xavier, home to Francis Xavier's family) aimed at dampening any spirits of resistance and thwarting future rebellions against Spanish occupation.

In September 1517, Charles landed in Asturias on the northern coast of Spain. He arranged to meet with Cisneros in Valladolid and receive a briefing on the situation in his Spanish kingdoms. While making preparations for the meeting, Cisneros fell ill. He was still weak from illness when he began his journey to Valladolid and only made it as far as Aranda when his weakness and rumors of the plague forced him to seek shelter in the Monastery of Aguilera. Cisneros never recovered. In early November Charles sent a note thanking him for his services and giving him leave to retire. It is not clear whether Cisneros ever received the letter. He died on 8 November 1517 at Roa.

== Influence ==
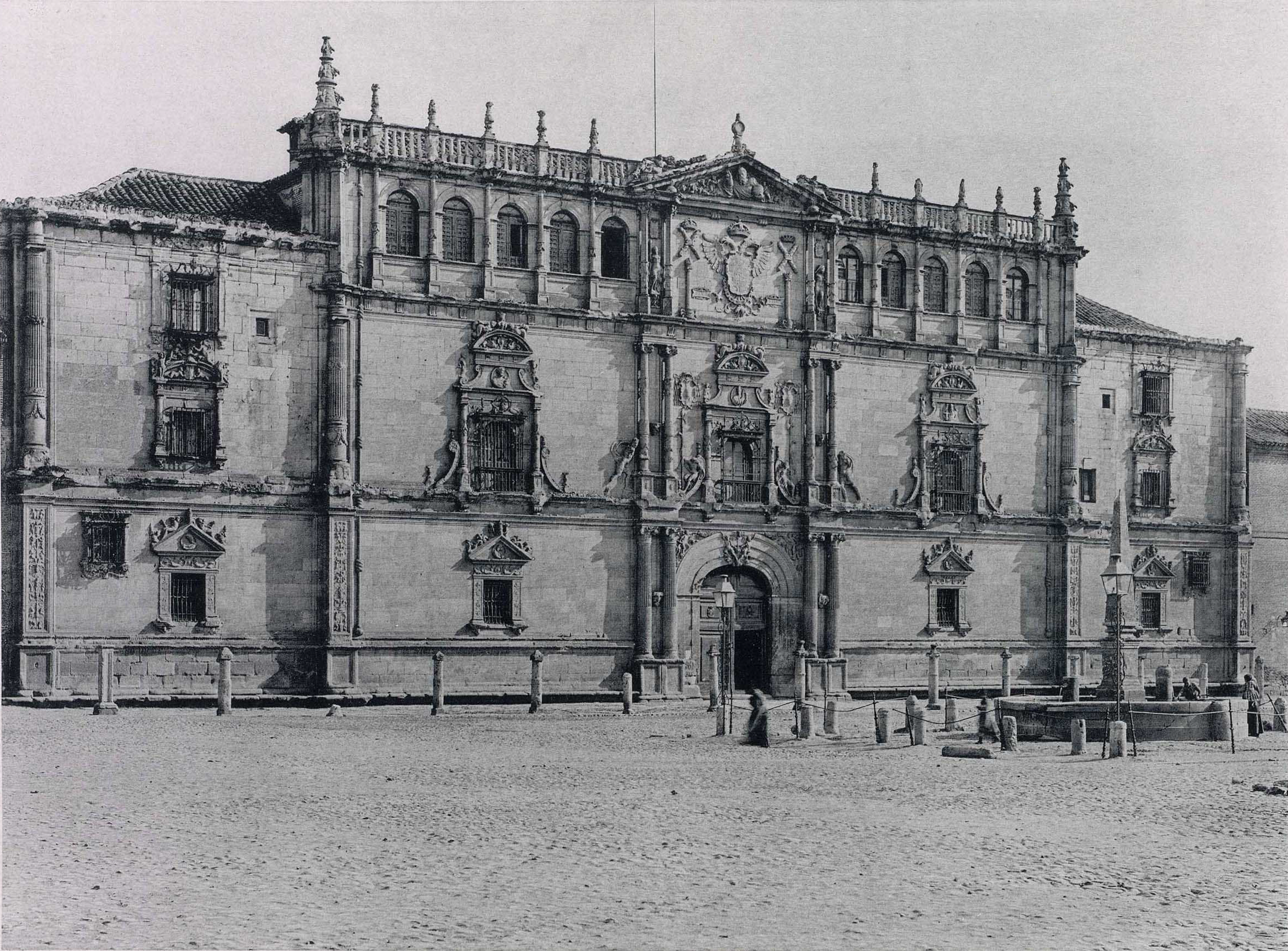
University of Alcalá de Henares or Complutense University.

Cardinal Cisneros was a bold and determined statesman. Described as stern, fanatical and inflexible even by the harsh standards of his time, with a confidence that became at times overbearing, he carried through what he had decided to be right, with little regard for the convenience of others or for himself. He was seen as incorruptible, and founded and maintained numerous benevolent institutions in his diocese. His whole life was devoted either to the state or to religion; and his only recreation was in theological or scholastic discussion.

The university at Alcalá de Henares was founded in 1500 and opened in 1508. The university, raised at the sole expense of and fostered by Cardinal Cisneros, attained a great reputation. At one time 7,000 students met within its walls. All the religious orders in Spain, except the Benedictines and Hieronymites, established houses at Alcalá in connection with it. In 1836 the university, with falling enrollments and in some disarray, was moved to Madrid, renamed the Universidad Complutense de Madrid ("Complutense" means "from Alcalá", whose Latin name is Complutum), and the buildings in Alcalá de Henares were left vacant until the creation of the modern University of Alcalá de Henares in 1977.

Cisneros published religious treatises by himself and others. He also revived the Mozarabic liturgy, and endowed a chapel in Toledo where it was to be used.

He is well known for his sponsorship of the Complutensian Polyglot, the first printed polyglot translation of the Bible, in which three different versions of the Old Testament were put in parallel columns – Greek, Latin, and Hebrew – with the Aramaic text of Targum Onkelos and its own Latin translation added at the bottom, so that readers for the first time could check all the translations simultaneously. The New Testament consisted of parallel columns of Greek and the Latin Vulgate. The text occupies five volumes, and a sixth contains a Hebrew lexicon, etc. The work commenced in 1502. The New Testament was finished in January 1514, and the whole in April 1517. The book was dedicated to Pope Leo X. Cisneros died months after it was completed and did not live to see it published.

== Cause of beatification and canonization ==
A cause for Cisneros's beatification was formally opened on 15 October 1669, granting him the title of Servant of God. His spiritual writings were approved by theologians on 1 March 1681. He was later granted the title of Venerable.

== Commemoration ==
In 1884, Spanish colonists commemorated Cisneros by founding Villa Cisneros, now Dakhla, Western Sahara.

The Spanish Navy armored cruiser Cardenal Cisneros, commissioned in 1902, was named for Cisneros.

== See also ==
- Order of Cisneros, state order established in 1944

== Other languages ==
- Pérez, Joseph (2014) Cisneros, el cardenal de España. Barcelona: Taurus ISBN 978-84-306-0948-2

Catholic Church titles
Preceded by Diego Ramírez de Guzmán	Grand Inquisitor of Castile; 1507–1517	Succeeded by Adriaan Boeyens
Records
Preceded by Jaime Serra i Cau	Oldest living Member of the Sacred College; 15 March 1517 - 8 November 1517	Succeeded by Tamás Bakócz
