= Capture of Mers-el-Kébir (1505) =

- Part of the Spanish-Algerian war (1503–1512)
Date	September 13, 1505
Location	Mers-el-Kébir, Kingdom of Tlemcen
Result	Spanish victory
Territorial changes	Mers-el-Kébir captured by Spain

Belligerents
(Crown of Castile) Kingdom of Spain	Kingdom of Tlemcen

Commanders and leaders
(Crown of Castile) Ramón de Cardona (Crown of Castile) Diego Fernández	Abu Abdallah V

Strength
7,000 soldiers 170 sailing vessels	1,500 soldiers 30 horsemen

Casualties and losses
Unknown	Unknown

The Capture of Mers-el-Kébir on September 13, 1505 was the first campaign carried out by the Spanish Empire in its war against the Zayyanid Kingdom of Tlemcen (in modern Algeria). Mers-el-Kébir (Spanish: Mazalquivir) was a roadstead open to the southwest winds, and a refuge for corsairs. The port was protected by a strong and well-armed castle, and it had already been unsuccessfully attacked by Portuguese troops in 1496 and 1501.

== Background ==
In Spain, after the conquest of Granada and the suppression of the Rebellion of the Alpujarras (1499–1501), a body of opinion including the highly influential Cardinal Cisneros favoured conquering the North African coast in order to prevent pirate attacks on the Spanish coast. The Kingdom of Tlemcen at the time was ruled by Abu Abdallah V, who was experiencing instability and weakness.

== Preparations ==
A fleet of one hundred and seventy ships assembled in the port of Malaga to transport and supply 7,000. Command at sea was held by the Catalan Ramón de Cardona and command on land by Diego Fernández de Córdoba, with Mers-el-Kébir being the objective of the expedition.

The navy left Malaga on August 20, 1505, but contrary winds made it return to port. She tried the start again on September 3, but for the same reason she was forced to stop in Almería. Finally, on September 9 it managed to embark, arriving on the 11th in sight of the Mers-el-Kébir coast.

The Tlemcenians, warned by spies of the fleet's departure and objectives, had concentrated their forces in the vicinity of Mers-el-Kébir. However, because of the delays caused by weather, they believed that it was heading to another destination and had dispersed.

== The attack ==
Three carracks under the Basques Juan de Lezcano or Lazcano and Flores de Marquina, who had shielded their hulls with wool sacks, approached the castle as closely as possible and subjected it to intense bombardment, attracting artillery fire. The infantry disembarked in a torrential rainstorm, proceeded to take the heights near Mers-el-Kébir and dug into positions there. From here they were able to bombard the fortress below as well as the galleys in the port.

The following day on September 12, the Tlemcenian cavalry assaulted the Spanish positions but were repulsed. The defenders of the castle then proposed a truce until the 13th, promising to surrender the if they did not receive help from the king of Tlemcen. The truce was accepted, and as no Tlemcenian troops appeared on September 13, the besieged with their families and possessions left, and the Spanish occupied the castle. Once they had taken positions in the castle, the Spaniards saw a large Tlemcenian army coming to the aid of the city. However, seeing the city was already lost, it retreated back to Oran.

As a result, nearly 300 years of Spanish control followed, interrupted only occasionally, such as in the Recapture of Oran (1708). On 24 September the fleet sailed for Malaga, leaving behind a Spanish garrison of 500 men.
