= Ramón de Cardona =

Spanish politician and general

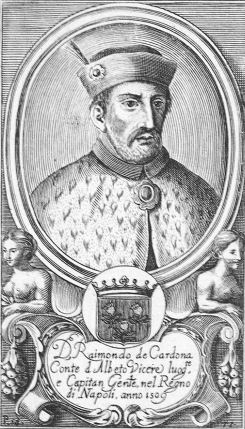
Ramon Folc de Cardona-Anglesola.

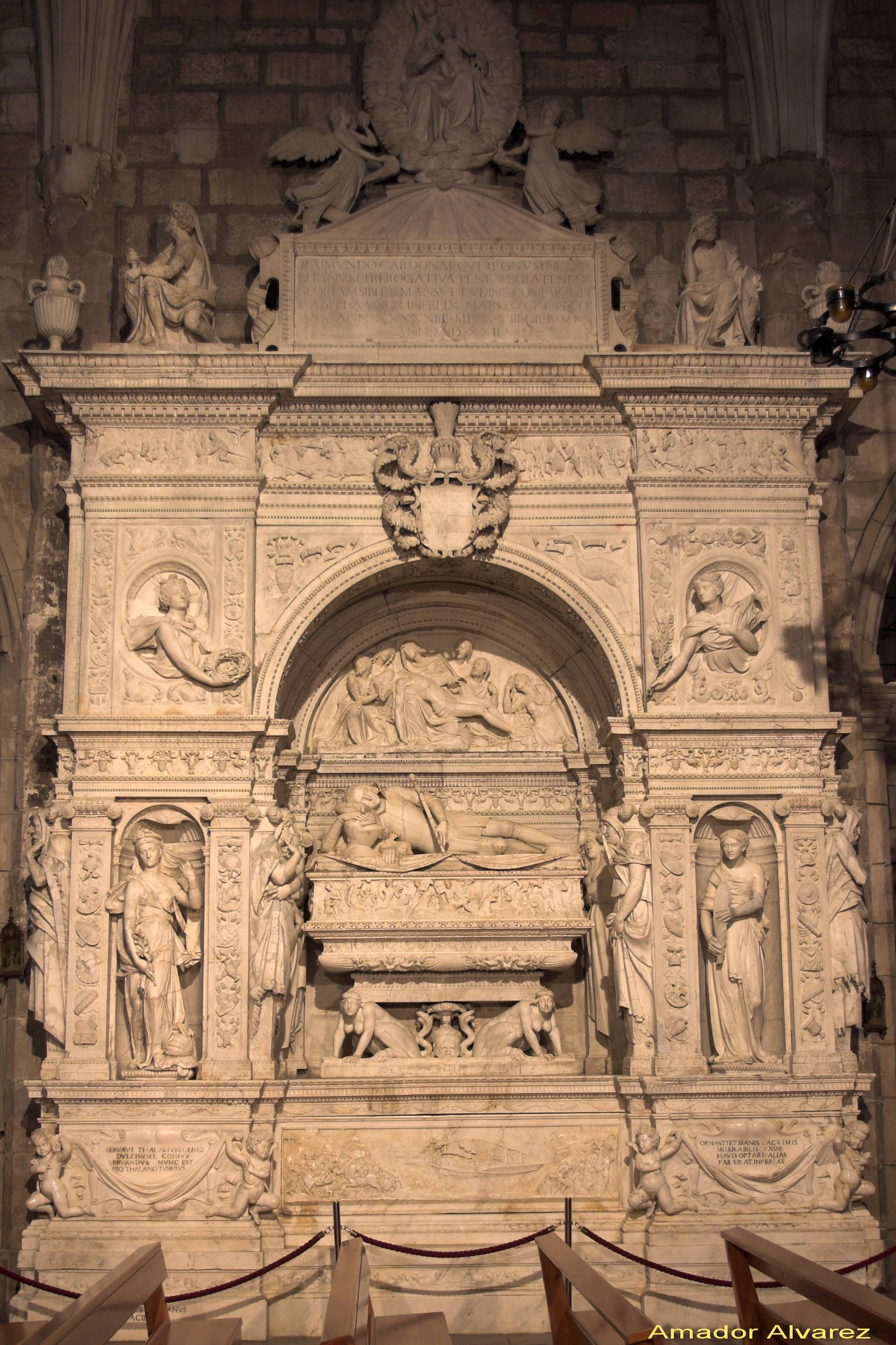
Tomb of Ramon de Cardona, by Giovanni da Nola.

Ramon Folc de Cardona i Anglesola (Italian: Raimondo di Cardona) (1467 – 10 March 1522) was a Spanish general and politician, who served as the viceroy of Naples during the Italian Wars and commanded the Spanish forces in Italy during the War of the League of Cambrai. He was granted the title count of Oliveto in the Kingdom of Naples, on 12 December 1515.

== Biography ==
The son of Antoni de Cardona-Anglesola i Centelles and Castellana de Requesens, he was 5th Baron of Bellpuig, Baron of Linyola and Baron of Utxafava, all three places in Catalonia. Ramón de Cardona was born in Bellpuig, to one of the greatest families in the Crown of Aragon, the Cardona. On 12 December 1502 he was awarded the title of Duke of Soma, taking part in 1505, with the role of admiral, in the capture of Mers-el-Kébir.

He also participated in the Third Italian War, where his fleet carried reinforcements for the Spanish army of Gonzalo Fernández de Córdoba in conjunction with the ships of fellow admiral Juan de Lezcano. Cardona also engaged a French carrack with a flotilla of smaller galleys in the coast of Calabria, driving it away from the Spanish-controlled territory. Later, he was made Viceroy of Sicily from 1507 to 1509.

King Ferdinand II of Aragon, of whom he has been postulated to be a natural son, made him Viceroy of Naples in 1509. He stayed there till his death in 1522. In 1510 he received instructions on introducing the Inquisition in Naples, a decision which caused a popular revolt; after which the Spanish king canceled the decree.

Portrait of Doña Isabel de Requesens, wife of Ramón de Cardona by Raphael.

In 1511 Cardona moved to northern Italy as the commander-in-chief of the League of Cambrai army, leaving the Neapolitan government to his wife Isabel de Requesens, 2nd countess of Palamós, 2nd countess of Avellino, 2nd countess of Trivento, baroness of Calonge, daughter of Galceran de Requesens the first holder of these titles.

In the following year he was defeated by Gaston of Foix, Duke of Nemours at the Battle of Ravenna. Cardona then moved to Tuscany to support the then Spanish-supported House of Medici. His troops besieged Prato, massacring the population after its fall.

In 1513 Cardona returned to Lombardy with a new army the following year and fought successfully at the Battle of La Motta, defeating the Venetian army led by Bartolomeo d'Alviano. He was however unable to prevent the Venetians from joining with the French at the Battle of Marignano.

In February 1513, after the death of Pope Julius II, (1443–1513), a.k.a. Giuliano della Rovere and the arrival in Italy of King Francis I of France, Cardona was called back to Spain. In 1515 he had received the title of Count of Alvito, a fiefdom in what is now southern Lazio. In 1519 the new king of Spain, Charles I of Spain, a.k.a. Charles V, Holy Roman Emperor, made him Great Admiral of the Kingdom of Naples.

He died at Naples in 1522. His cenotaph in Bellpuig, executed by Giovanni da Nola, is one of the most outstanding examples of Renaissance art in the region.

== Children ==
He had three children:

- Ferran Folch de Cardona i de Requesens, 2nd duke of Soma, 3rd count of Oliveto and other titles. Viceroy of Sicily, deceased 13 September 1571.
- Catalina (Caterina) Castellana Folch de Cardona i de Requesens, married Don Ferrante d'Aragona, 1st duke of Montalto, illegitimate son of King Ferrante I of Naples and Diana Guardato. Their descendants were the "Moncada" family, Sicilian Princes of Paternò and Grandees of Spain.
- Catalina de Cardona-Anglesola (1519 – 1577), illegitimate daughter.

== Notes ==
| Preceded by Juan de Lanuza y Garabito | Viceroy of Sicily; 1507-1509 | Succeeded by Hugo of Moncada |
| Preceded by Juan de Aragón | Viceroy of Naples; 1509-1522 | Succeeded by Charles de Lannoy |
