= Abu Abdallah V =

- Emir

Sultan of Tlemcen
- Reign: 1505–1516
- Predecessor: Abu Abdallah IV
- Successor: Abu Hammu III; Abu Zayyan III
- Died: 1516; Tlemcen
- House: Zayyanid
- Father: Abu Abdallah IV
- Religion: Islam

Abu Abdallah V (Arabic: أبو عبد الله محمد الخامس الزياني) (ruled 1505–1516) was a Sultan of the Kingdom of Tlemcen in Algeria. He was a son of Abu Abdallah IV. In the beginning of his reign the Oran Fatwa were made during his reign he defeated Spain in the battle of Mers-el-Kebir (1507) and lost Oran in 1509, he also according some sources had to be vassal of Aragon in 1512 which will be ended by the failed expedition to Tlemcen by Spain and indefinitively ended by the ruler Abu Zayyan IV and his struggle against Spain in Tlemcen and his brother allied to them in June 1543 by the support of Iznassen tribe.
