= Wasitat al-suluk fi siyasat al-muluk =

Islamic political theory book

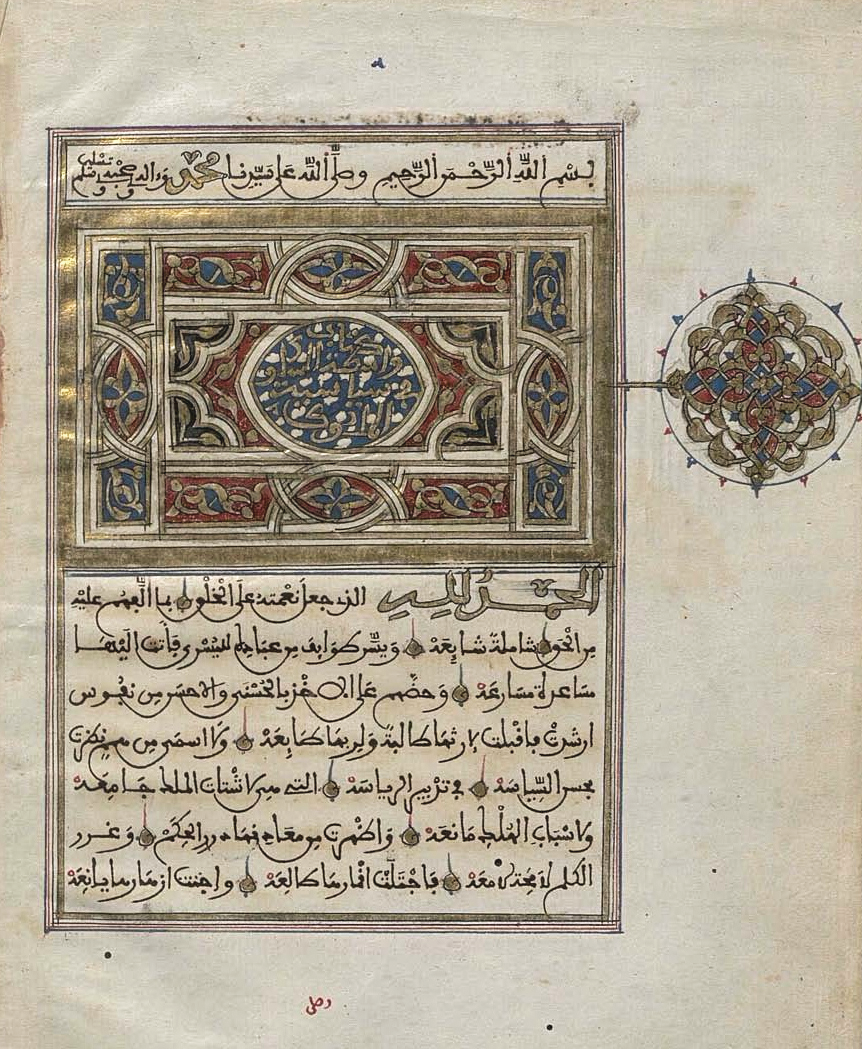
- First page of a manuscript version, preserved at the National Library of the Kingdom of Morocco
- Author: Abu Hammu II
- Original title: واسطة السلوك في سياسة الملوك
- Language: Arabic
- Subject: politics, philosophy, wisdom, governance
- Genre: Islamic mirrors for princes
- Publication date: between 1359 and 1389
- Publication place: Kingdom of Tlemcen

Wassitat al-Suluk fi Siyasat al-Muluk (Arabic: واسطة السلوك في سياسة الملوك Arabic) is a treatise on political theory belonging to the genre of Islamic mirrors for princes. The work was written by Sultan Abu Hammu II, the ruler of the Kingdom of Tlemcen between 1359 and 1389 CE (760–791 of the Hijra). The exact date of the book's composition is not precisely known, but it is likely that it was written between 1364 and 1376 (765–777 of the Hijra). This ruler succeeded in regaining control of Tlemcen, which had been under the control of his rivals, the Marinids, and in restoring the territories that had once been under the authority of his Zayyanid ancestors. The book is also one of the few available primary sources documenting the reign of the Zayyanids in the central Maghreb (parts of present-day Algeria). The book contains a series of political advice and recommendations from Sultan Abu Hammu II to his son and heir, Abu Tachfin II, as well as to other princes and kings. The author addresses essential themes such as the ethics of governance, justice, wisdom, courage, generosity, and insight. He also discusses the pillars of state management, such as the military, ministers, jurists, finances, etc., asserting that his book and the advice it contains are the foundation necessary for the success of any reign.

The style adopted by the author in this book combines political wisdom with an analysis of reality, avoiding the traditional moralizing approach. It also reflects the influence of Islamic political thought of the time, making it a document that contributes to tracing the evolution of this thought within the Islamic world. The book also served as a political reference for some rulers, such as the Alaouite rulers and their heirs (in present-day Morocco). However, the irony lies in the fact that his son, Abu Tachfin II, did not follow these recommendations and rebelled against him, allying with his Marinid rivals, which led to a reversal of the situation and the death of the sultan, orchestrated by his own son who succeeded him. This work is unique within this literary genre because its author, Abu Hammu II, was not only a thinker or philosopher of this school of thought but also a ruler who exercised power. He attempted to reconcile political theory and practice, whereas the task of writing such political works was typically entrusted to court writers, jurists, or intellectuals. This work thus reflects a rare duality in the Islamic world.

The book was first published in print in Tunis in 1862, but this edition was incomplete and lacked scientific rigor in its establishment. Subsequently, the work has been translated into several languages, including Spanish, and Turkish. A group of historians and researchers became interested in locating manuscripts of the book to establish a new critical text and study its content as well as the sources used by the sultan. This interest grew after the 1974 publication of the book Abu Hammu Mussa al-Zayani: His Life and Works by Algerian historian Abdelhamid Hadjiat, which highlighted the life and accomplishments of the sultan, thus encouraging further research and studies on this ruler. The book has also been subject to criticism, with some arguing that it merely summarizes earlier works in the field without offering anything new. Others dispute this claim, asserting that the book presents innovative political ideas. Among the criticisms also leveled at the book is the use of certain stories, narratives, and hadiths without rigorous verification of their authenticity, which can be explained by the absence of a critical approach at the time, where the goal of such works was often to justify the legitimacy of the sultan and demonstrate his profound knowledge of the subject matter.

== Background ==
Political writing by non-juristic Muslim thinkers emerged early, (Note: Some historians believe that the first origins of this type of political writing dates back to the letter of Ali ibn Abi Talib to Malik al-Ashtar.) as early as the 8th century (2nd century of the Hijra), with one of its earliest precursors being Abd al-Hamid al-Katib. In his letter to the Umayyad crown prince Marwan II, he offered ethical and political advice, emphasizing the importance of knowledge, wisdom, piety, and determination in the exercise of power. He also stressed the need for caution in evaluating information and avoiding decisions based on unverified reports. This letter thus represents one of the first examples of Islamic political thought, combining moral principles with the management of power.

However, the Arabs did not widely engage in political writing before the rise of the translation movement during the Abbasid period. Prior to this, the role of the ruler was primarily defined through Islamic principles, relying on the Quran and hadiths for the application of religious laws. With the encouragement of the Abbasid caliphs, Ibn al-Muqaffa was one of the first to translate Persian works into Arabic, such as Kalila wa Dimna, Khwaday-Namag, and Al-Adab al-Saghir wal-Kabir. This initiative marked the beginning of a new literary genre combining politics, wisdom, and history. However, this genre remained largely influenced by religious and moral preaching, rather than a deep political analysis.

After developing in the East, this literary genre spread to the Maghreb and Al-Andalus in the 11th century (5th century of the Hijra), with authors such as al-Humaydi from Al-Andalus, who wrote Al-Dhahab al-Masbuk fi Wa'dh al-Muluk. (Note: In Arabic: الذهب المسبوك في وعظ الملوك) It is believed that he composed his work during his stay in the Mashriq, as it is almost unknown in the Maghreb and does not appear in any local manuscript catalog. At the same time, under the Almoravids, al-Hadrami was one of the first to write on this subject with his book Al-Siyasa aw al-Ishara fi Tadbir al-Imara, (Note: In Arabic: السياسة أو الاشارة في تدبير الإمارة) addressed to the Almoravid ruler Abu Bakr ibn Umar. Subsequently, several other political works emerged and gradually spread in the region.

Over time, two directions emerged in this Islamic political literature: the first, a moralist trend, as seen in Sulwan al-Muta (Note: In arabic: سلوان المطاع) by Ibn Zafar and Kanz al-Muluk (Note: In Arabic: كنز الملوك) by Sibt ibn al-Jawzi, where politics was primarily viewed through the lens of moderation, patience, and detachment from power ambitions. The exercise of power was thus subordinated to ethical and spiritual considerations. The second trend, more pragmatic, represented by Risalat al-Sahaba (Note: In Arabic: رسالة الصحابة) by Ibn al-Muqaffa and Political Letters of Ibn al-Khatib, approached politics in a more realistic and analytical manner, without resorting to moral exhortation or edifying narratives. It is in this context that the Zayyanid Sultan Abu Hammu II, through his book Wasitat al-Suluk fi Siyasat al-Muluk, sought to find a balance between politics and morality. He proposed a nuanced vision that reflected the historical reality of his time, analyzing virtues such as generosity, courage, and wisdom from a political and pragmatic perspective. According to historian Abdelhamid Hadjiat, "This work represents a significant advancement in Arab political thought, as it emphasizes political and administrative analysis, rather than being limited to a mere exhortatory treatise or historical narrative".

== Overview ==
=== Author ===
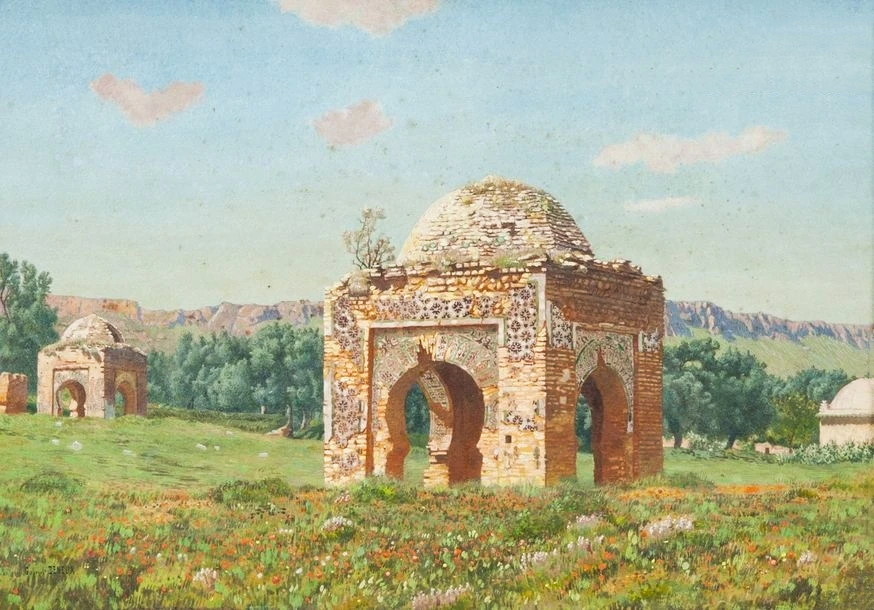
Tombs of the Zayyanid Princesses in Tlemcen by Gabriel Charles Deneuxf. The city was the seat of power of Abu Hammu II.

Wasitat al-Suluk fi Siyasat al-Muluk is a political work written by Sultan Abu Hammu II of the Zayyanid dynasty, who restored the Kingdom of Tlemcen after the lands of his Zayyanid ancestors had temporarily fallen under the control of the Marinids. He ruled from 1359 (760 AH) to 1389 (791 AH), and during his reign, he successfully rebuilt his state and strengthened his position in the region. This book was written as a guide to governance and administration, in which the sultan sought to leave his son and heir, Abu Tachfin II, a series of political advices to guide him in managing state affairs. However, it is ironic that his son did not follow his father's advice, rebelling against him and allying with the Marinids, which led to a bloody conflict and the death of his father, who was killed on the orders of his son, who then ascended to the throne.

The book also includes a collection of poems by the sultan, while another book, Raih al-Arwah, fi ma qala al-Mawla Abu Hammu min al-Shi'r wa qal fi-hi min al-Madh, (Note: In Arabic: راح الأرواح فيما قاله أبو حمو أو قيل عنه من الأمداح) which gathered the sultan's poems along with praises from some of his contemporaneous poets from Tlemcen, is still lost. The title of the book, Wasitat al-Suluk fi Siyasat al-Muluk, was personally chosen by the sultan, who explains in the introduction the choice of the title: "… I have seen that the first gift we must offer to our heir, to our successor, and, if God wills, to our caliph, would be wise advice and practical and scientific politics regarding what belongs to kings, in order to organize their affairs in an exemplary manner. That is why this book was called Wasitat al-Suluk fi Siyasat al-Muluk, its name being in harmony with its meaning, and its formulation matching its content."

The title appeared in various forms in French bibliographies such as Chapelet des perles, Traité de l'art de régner, Le moyen de connaître la politique des princes, or Le meilleur comportement politique des rois. In Spanish the title used was El collar de perlas, obra que trata de política y administración.

This book is mentioned in several historical Arabic works, including:

- Ahmad al-Maqqari, who discusses it in his famous work Nafh al-tib min ghousn al-Andalus al-Ratib;
- Ibn al-Khatib, in his book Al-Ihata fi Akhbar Gharnata;
- Al-Tanasi, in Nadm al-Durr wal-Aqiyan fi Bayan Sharaf Bani Ziyan;
- Ismail Pasha al-Baghdadi, in Idah al-Maknun fi al-Dhayl ala Kashf al-Zunun;
- Khayr al-Din al-Zirikli, in Al-Alam;
- Shawqi Daif, who mentions it in his History of Arabic Literature.

Iraqi historian Said al-Ghanimi believes that abd al-Rahman Ibn Khaldun was well aware of this book, but did not mention it in his Kitab al-Ibar.

=== Date of Composition ===
There is no definitive text establishing the exact date of the book's composition, as Abu Hammu II did not clearly specify this in his work. However, some historians have attempted to determine the period in which it was written. Algerian researcher Abdelhamid Hadjiat has indicated that the date of composition can be estimated based on certain internal clues within the text. Referring to contemporary events during the sultan's reign, the way he addresses his son Abu Tachfin II (who appears to be still a young child), and his mention of his minister Abdullah ibn Muslim, whom he refers to without using the phrase "May Allah have mercy on him" (which would have been used for the deceased), it can be inferred that the work was probably written in 765 AH (1363–1364). Lebanese researcher Wadad Kadi, on the other hand, estimated that the writing period spanned from 1359 (760 AH), when Abu Hammu II entered Tlemcen and took the city back from the Marinids, until 1375 (777 AH), the year in which Yahya Ibn Khaldun (brother of Abd al-Rahman Ibn Khaldun) completed his book Bughiyyat al-Ruwad fi Dhikr Muluk Abd al-Wad, which mentions the sultan's work. Based on the poems and estimating their composition date, the researcher narrowed down the period of composition of the book between 1370 and 1375 (771 AH-777 AH).

=== Content ===
In his book, the sultan discusses the various rules that rulers must follow in governing and politics, with a strong emphasis on moral principles, which are fundamental both for the sultan himself and his close collaborators, within a framework of practical advice and management. What distinguishes this work is that it was not written by scholars or the sultan's court writers, but by the sultan himself. In this book, he addresses his heir, Abu Tachfin II, and other princes and kings, making it a direct testament to the sultan's vision of governance and his ethics.

The book is divided into an introduction, four main sections, and a conclusion. It aims to guide his son in the management of the Kingdom of Tlemcen. In the introduction, the author specifies that the goal of the book is to provide his son with the foundation for just governance. The first section contains general advice for the ruler, including justice, piety, financial management, and attention to ministers and advisors, as well as the proximity of generals and princes. The second section, the most important, addresses the basics of governance, such as wisdom, politics, justice, and the importance of finances and armies. The third section analyzes the qualities necessary for a ruler, such as courage, generosity, wisdom, and forgiveness. The author believes that the foundation of the political system relies on the use of intellect in managing state affairs and the assistance of sages and experts in decision-making, rejecting decisions based solely on personal opinions, which serve neither this world nor the Afterlife. Finally, the fourth section addresses intuition and physiognomy to understand the motivations and behaviors of individuals. The conclusion offers advice on ethics, the pursuit of truth, supporting Muslims in Al-Andalus, and the celebration of the mawlid (the prophet Muhammad's birthday), ending with some poems.

The book serves as a political and moral guide for rulers, blending practical governance with Islamic religious values. The content of the book is structured by the sultan as follows:

Table of contents of Wasitat al-Suluk fi Siyasat al-Muluk
Section	Title
Chapter one : observations, recommendations, and advice for governing justly
First Section	Advice for qualifying as just and adorning with virtues
Second Section	Recommendations for imposing reason over passion and encouraging fear of God
Third Section	Practical advice for accumulating wealth to achieve the set goal
Fourth Section	Recommendations for maintaining the army, its troops, officers, and leaders
Chapter two : Regarding the pillars of the kingdom and Its foundations, and what a king must possess to ensure his control
First Pillar	Intelligence (mind)
Second Pillar	Politics
Third Pillar	Justice
Fourth Pillar	The dilemma: money or army
Chapter three : Regarding the praiseworthy qualities that compose, perfect, and beautify a king
First Quality	Courage
Second Quality	Generosity
Third Quality	Kindness
Fourth Quality	Indulgence
Chapter four: physiognomy (al-firasa) as a complement to political administration

== Book importance ==
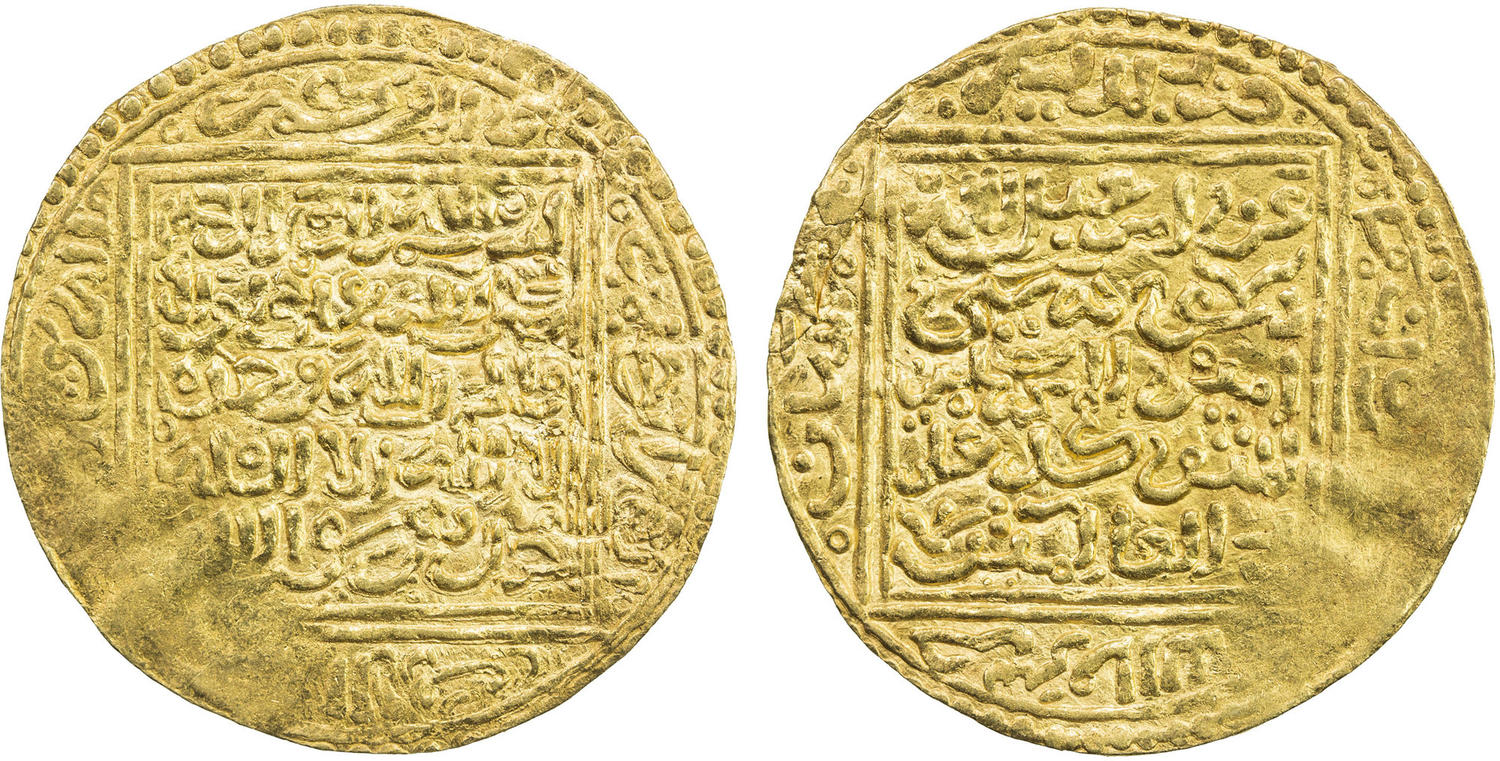
Gold dinar minted during the reign of Abu Hammu II

Since the publication of Abu Hammu al-Zayani: His Life and Works in 1974 by historian Abdelhamid Hadjiat, which provides an in-depth study of the life and works of the sultan, interest in this Zayyanid ruler and his book Wasitat al-Suluk fi Siyasat al-Muluk has continued to grow. The value of this work lies not only in its political nature, a genre of literature that was widespread at the time, but also in the fact that its author was not merely a scholar but an active ruler. Unlike other political theorists, Abu Hammu II combined political reflection with the actual exercise of power, making him a rare example in the history of the Islamic world.

=== Historical and Political ===
French researcher Jennifer Vanz highlights the importance of historical works published during the reign of Abu Hammu II, as they constitute almost the only surviving primary sources documenting the reign of the Zayyanid dynasty. While other historical works may have been lost, writings such as Zahr al-Bustan fi Dawlat Bani Ziyan (by an unknown author) or Bughyat al-Ruwad fi Dhikr Muluk Bani 'Abd al-Wad by Yahya Ibn Khaldoun (brother of Abd aI-rahman ibn Khaldun) testify to the historical dynamism of this period. The fact that three historical works were written during his reign reflects the sultan's interest in documenting the history of his dynasty and his concern for providing political guidance to future generations.

Moreover, Wasitat al-Suluk fi Siyasat al-Muluk serves as an important document for understanding the conflicts of the time and their consequences, as well as the movements of tribes in the Maghreb and their origins. The book provides valuable insights into contemporary historical events, either through direct testimony or from historical sources and accounts. It describes major events, such as the battle where Abu al-Hasan al-Marini was defeated in Al-Andalus, and the reconquest of Tlemcen by the Abu Hammu II in 1358 (760 AH). It also offers the sultan's views on historical figures such as the Umayyad caliph Abd al-Malik ibn Marwan and his reliance on Al-Hajjaj ibn Yousef as governor. According to Abdelhamid Hadjiat, these political observations reflect "the foresight and critical vision of the author." The content of the book provides researchers with a better understanding of the social and political context of the Maghreb, as well as its interactions with other dynasties at the time.

Additionally, Wasitat al-Suluk fi Siyasat al-Muluk also served as a political guide for rulers and princes, particularly Muhammed I, Emir of Tafilalet, who referenced Abu Hammu II's book in a letter to Mohammed al-Hajj al-Dila'i: ".. regarding what you asserted about the fact that some alliances between rulers are, in reality, ruses and deceptions, Sultan Abu Hammu, Lord of Tlemcen, had already stated this before you."" According to historian Muhammed Bencherifa, the work was an essential reference in the political education of the Alaouite rulers in present-day Morocco and their heirs for a long period. The poet and vizier Mohammed ibn Idris al-Amrawi also mentions the Alaouite sultan Abderrahmane ben Hicham's interest in this book, noting that he gifted a copy to his son, Mohammed IV. As a result, the book circulated among the Alaouite rulers, from Muhammed I to Muhammed IV.

=== Literary and Social ===
Wasitat al-Suluk fi Siyasat al-Muluk contains several Arabic poems written by the author, which hold significant literary value. These poems offer a glimpse into the intellectual and cultural life of Tlemcen at the time. According to researcher Mahmoud Boutar'a, this period was marked by a high level of artistic and linguistic refinement, and the poetry of Abu Hammu II reflects the intellectual and aesthetic level of the elites of his time. Although of Berber origin, the sultan was proficient in Arabic and its rhetorical subtleties, allowing him to express his ideas with great precision and eloquence. This aspect highlights the importance and spread of the Arabic language among the rulers and scholars of his time. Despite his political and military engagements, the sultan left behind a rich intellectual, historical, and literary legacy, illustrating his cultured personality and his interest in knowledge as much as in power.

Although the work is purely political, it remains influenced by the Arabic literary tradition, as most medieval Islamic political writings were. The author incorporates historical examples and stories that blend fact and fiction, making the work more narrative than strictly analytical at times. He also cites classical literary works, using proverbs and maxims to illustrate his political ideas. This reflects the influence of Arabic literary and rhetorical traditions in addressing political issues, where politics and literature were closely intertwined in writings directed at rulers. The book also carries social significance, as it addresses the behaviors and values of rulers and the governing elites of the time (kings, emirs, viziers, and high officials). Through his writings, Abu Hammu II emphasizes reason as the foundation of power and administration. According to Abdelhamid Hadjiat, this approach reflects the influence of philosophers on the author, who distances himself from mystical Sufi beliefs and also contrasts with al-Ghazali's views on the role of reason and intellect in politics. Thus, he advocates governance based on rationality and reflection, rather than solely on faith.

== Versions of the Book ==
=== Manuscripts ===
Several manuscript copies of the book Wasitat al-Suluk fi Siyasat al-Muluk are preserved in various libraries around the world. The oldest known copy is currently preserved at the National Library of Algeria. Among these copies, we find the following:

- Manuscript of the National Library of Algeria: This copy is kept at the National Library of Algeria under number 1374. It is a complete version consisting of 94 pages, measuring 204 × 260 mm. It is well-preserved and bound. This manuscript is considered one of the copies closest chronologically to the author's time, having been copied in Algeria about a century after the death of the sultan. The manuscript is written in Maghrebi calligraphy with black ink, and its copy dates back to the 10th century of the Hijra (16th century CE). A header annotation indicates that it was one of the most widely circulated copies at the time.
- Manuscript of the National Library of France: This copy is held at the National Library of France under identifier Arabe 7246. It belonged to a former professor named Moulay Hassan al-Baghdadi. The copy dates from the beginning of Jumada al-Awwal 926 AH (April 1520 CE) and bears the signature of the scribe. It was digitized and made available online by the library in 2017. The manuscript is written in brown ink in Maghrebi calligraphy, with vocalized text. Titles and important words are written in red, green, or brown. It includes 124 folios, measuring 270 × 190 mm. The manuscript's identification sheet indicates that other copies are preserved in Istanbul, dating from 1296 AH (1878 CE).
- Manuscript of the General Archives of Rabat: This copy is stored in Rabat, Morocco, under number 586. It bears the signature of its owner, though no further details are provided. The manuscript comprises 154 pages, each measuring 200 × 290 mm. Each page contains about 30 lines. The copy dates from 1129 AH (1717 CE) and is written in Maghrebi calligraphy, with marginal annotations.
- Manuscript of King Saud University Library: This copy is preserved in the manuscript department of the King Saud University Library in Riyadh, Saudi Arabia, under general number 7236 and classified code 320/و.ح. It is a photographic copy of the Rabat manuscript. It measures 205 × 290 mm and consists of 63 pages, with 30 lines per page. It is written in Maghrebi calligraphy with no mention of the scribe. It has been digitized and made available online.
- Manuscript of the Royal Palace of Morocco: This copy is kept at the Hassan II Library of the Royal Palace in Rabat, Morocco. It is one of the copies closest temporally to the Algerian manuscript. It is written in clear Maghrebi calligraphy, but access to it is difficult, which explains why it has been under-studied in previous research. It is listed under number 836 in the catalog and comprises 169 pages, measuring 220 × 130 mm. While the writing is clear, some parts of the text are faint and difficult to read.
- Manuscript of the National Library of Tunisia: This copy is preserved at the National Library of Tunisia, where it was digitized and published online in 2020.
- Manuscript of the Khizana of Adrar: This copy is preserved in the manuscript laboratory of the African University of Adrar (Algeria) under number 13577, and in the Khizana (library) of Adrar under number طمخ1263. Its dimensions are, with 63 pages 290 × 205 mmand 126 folios. It is written in Maghrebi calligraphy.
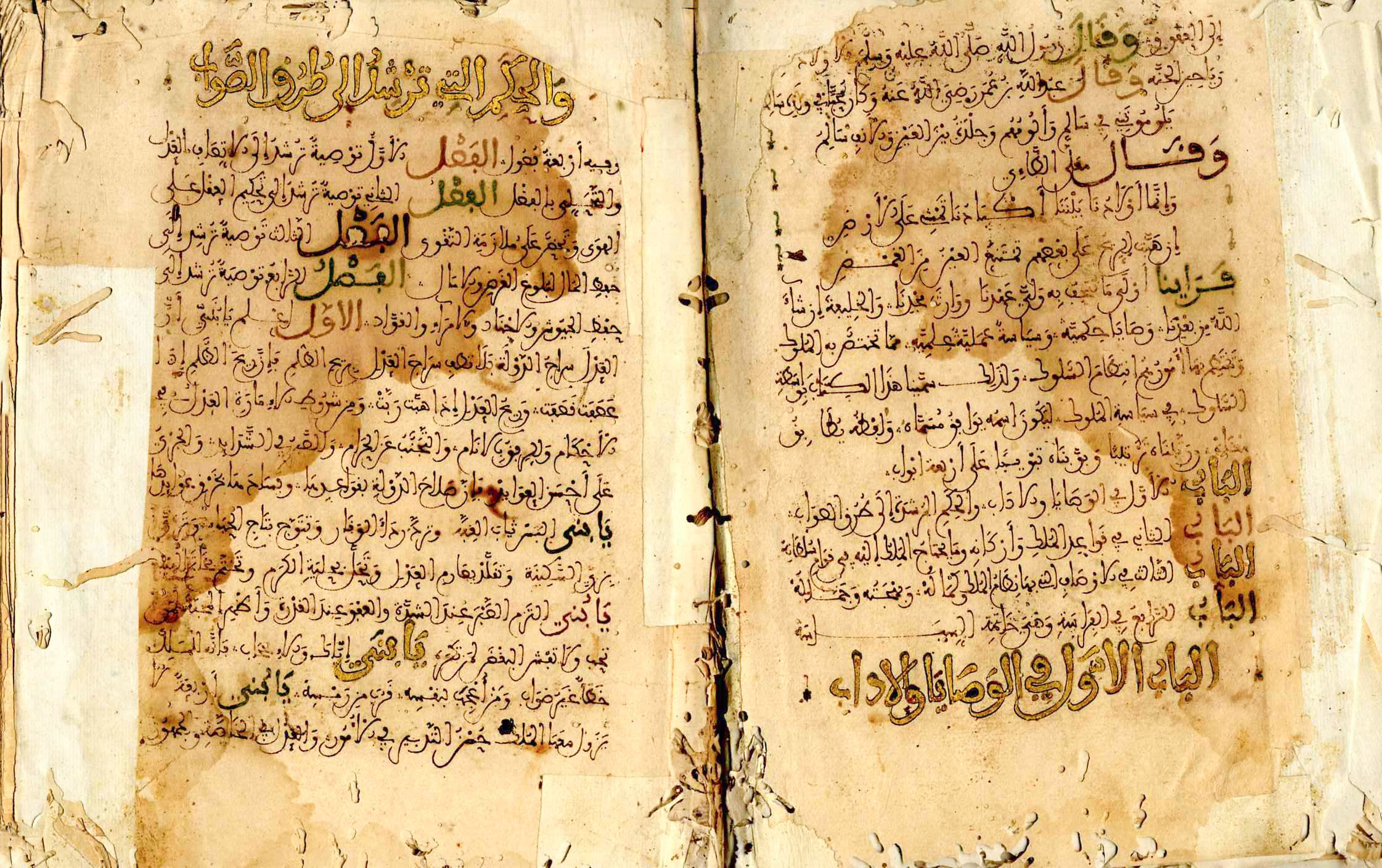
Manuscript from the Royal Palace Library of Morocco

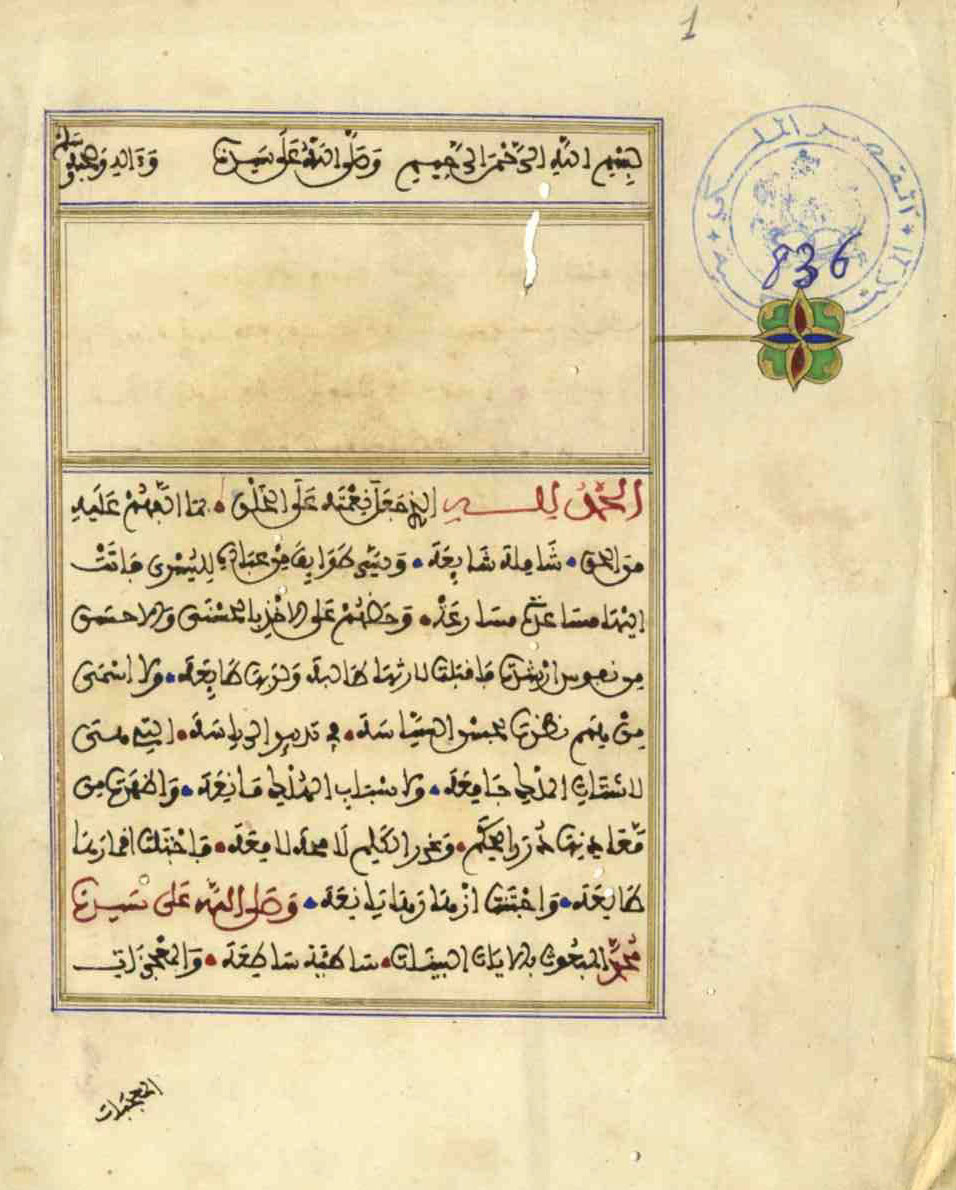
Manuscript from the Archives of Rabat

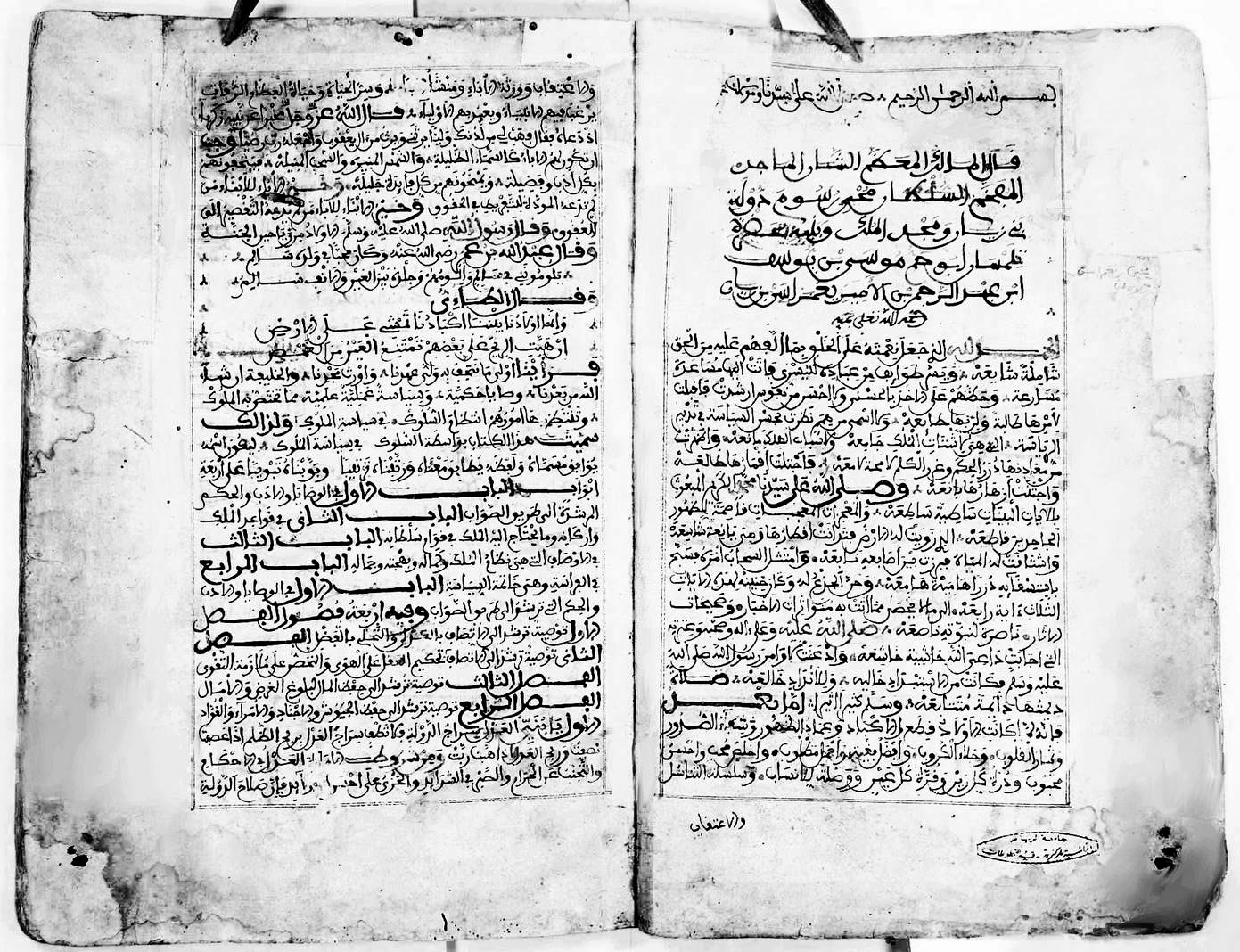
Manuscript from the King Saud University Library

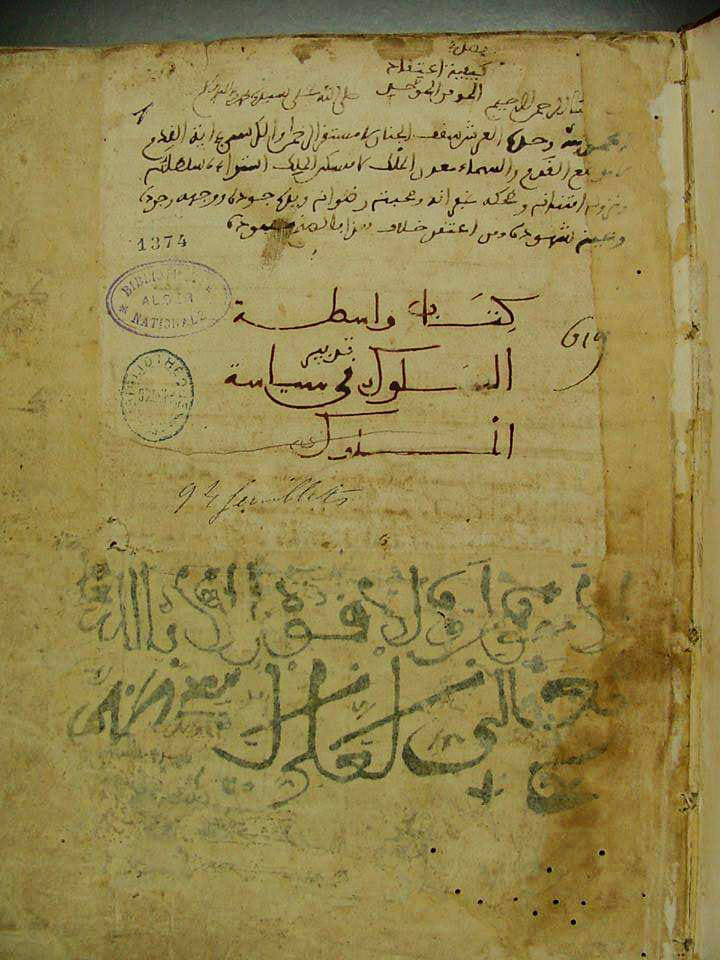
Manuscript from the National Library of Algeria

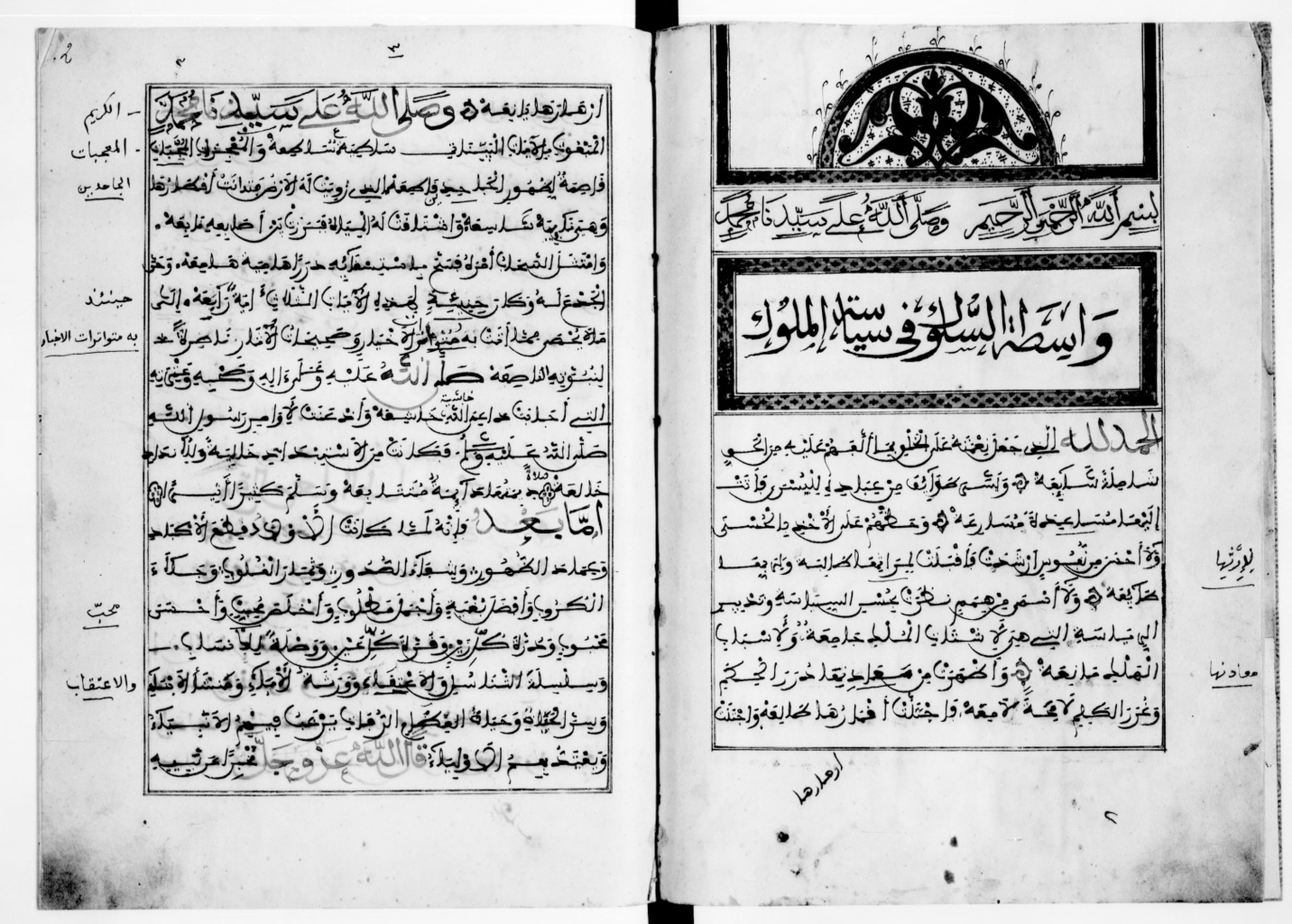
Manuscript from the National Library of France

=== Printed Editions ===
The text of Wasitat al-Suluk fi Siyasat al-Muluk has been edited and studied by several scholars, with varying levels of quality depending on the manuscripts used and the periods in which these editions were produced. Among these versions, we find:

- Tunis Printing Edition : This was the first printed edition of the book, published in 1863 in Tunis with the rise of printing presses. It was overseen by Mahmud Qabadu, a Tunisian writer and theologian, who corrected the first part of the text, while the second part was revised by Mohamed Béchir Touati. This edition was then distributed across various libraries, including the National Library of Algeria, the Royal Academy of History in Spain, the British Museum library, and the Asiatic Society Library in Kolkata. Although this version includes a brief introduction to Abu Hammu II, it has several shortcomings. It was printed with modest quality and lacks a rigorous scientific approach, with no annexes, notes, or explanatory comments, due to limited access to manuscripts at the time and the absence of a proper methodology in editing ancient texts.
- Istanbul Edition : A version of the book was printed in Islambol under the Ottoman Empire and published in 1878.
- Abdelhamid Hajiat Edition : The researcher Abdelhamid Hadjiat edited part of the book's text, based on the version preserved at the National Library of Algeria. His work focused specifically on the poems present in the manuscript, which he integrated into his book Abu Hammu Mussa al-Zayani: His Life and Works, published in 1974, where he analyzes the sultan's literary style.
- Abdelrahman Aoun and Mohammed al-Zahi Edition : This edition was published in 1990 by Dar Bousalama in Tunisia, comprising 204 pages. It includes an introduction written by Abdelrahman Aoun and Mohammed al-Zahi.
- Mahmoud Boutar'a Edition : The Algerian researcher Mahmoud Boutar'a edited the text based on the manuscript from the General Library of Rabat. His work focused on identifying and extracting the hadiths and Qur'anic verses mentioned in the book. He also analyzed the author, Abu Hammu II, his methodology, and the characteristics of his work. This edition, comprising 304 pages, was published in 2012 in collaboration with Dar al-Numan and Dar Chima in Algeria.
- Abdelghani Mohammed Ali Mastu Edition : This version was edited by Abdelghani Mohammed Ali Mastu, with an introduction by the Lebanese translator and thinker Ridwan as-Sayyid. The work contains 485 pages and was published in 2015 by the Ibn al-Azraq Center for Political Heritage Studies in Riyadh.
- Mohammed Mahmoud Khalaf Edition : The Iraqi researcher and translator Mohammed Mahmoud Khalaf edited the text based on the manuscript from the King Saud University Library. His work included verifying and correcting the Qur'anic verses and hadiths, as well as correcting Arabic terms in the text. He also explained complex words, identified historical figures, and documented the references to historical sources cited in the text. This edition includes appendices with a biography of Abu Hammu II, a summary of the Zayyanid dynasty's history, and an overview of similar political works of the same literary genre. The book, comprising 344 pages, was published in 2020 by Dar al-Kutub al-'Ilmiyya in Beirut.
- Jad al-Khannoussi Edition : The researcher and professor at the University of Cádiz, Jad al-Khannoussi, edited the text based on several manuscripts, including those from the National Library of Algeria and the Rabat Library, as part of his doctoral thesis. His work is accompanied by a study on Sultan Abu Hammu II and the Zayyanid dynasty, extracting hadiths and verifying their authenticity, as well as Qur'anic verses and historical narratives. He also added a detailed index of the cited works, poems, proverbs, historical figures, places, and political, economic, and social concepts mentioned in the text. After editing the text, he also translated it from Arabic to Spanish under the supervision of professors from the University of Cádiz. The work, comprising 586 pages, was published in 2023.

=== Translations ===
The book Wasitat al-Suluk fi Siyasat al-Muluk was first published in print in Tunis on 26 September 1862. The Spanish orientalist Pascual de Gayangos obtained a copy of this edition and sent it to the Royal Academy of History, which was interested in studying the history of Spain. The orientalist Francisco Codera then studied the content of the book and published an article about it in the Boletín de la Real Academia de la Historia in 1893.

Following this initial analysis, Mariano Gaspar, a Spanish orientalist and professor of Arabic at the University of Granada, undertook the translation of the book into Spanish, based on the edition of Tunis. (Note: See the section §Printed Editions above.) The work was published in 1899 in Zaragoza under a different title: El Collar de Perlas: Obra Que Trata de Política y Administración. This edition consisted of 549 pages. In the introduction to this edition, the translator Gaspar discussed the challenges he faced during the translation, particularly the complexity of the Arabic verses and the literary style, which almost made him abandon the project. However, the support of his colleagues encouraged him to continue his work. He also added a biography of the sultan, but instead of translating the introduction in the Tunisian edition, he wrote a new one. However, this Spanish translation contained several errors and divergences in meaning, which affected the accuracy of the original text. In 2023, Jad El Khannossi published a new Spanish translation of the book after editing it himself from the original Arabic manuscripts as part of his doctoral thesis at the University of Cádiz.

The book was also translated into Turkish and published in 1879, in an edition of 205 pages, printed in Constantinople.

== Critiques ==
=== Originality ===
The question of the originality of the content of Wasitat al-Suluk fi Siyasat al-Muluk has sparked debates regarding its intellectual independence and its connection with Ibn Zafar al-Siqilli's Sulwan al-Muta' fi 'Udwan al-Atba'. This debate largely relies on the writings of Ahmed al-Maqqari in Nafh al-Tib min ghousn al-Andalus al-Ratib, where he states that the sultan: "… authored a remarkable work on politics, in which he summarized Sulwan al-Muta' by Ibn Zafar, adding teachings and recounting several of his poems as well as events with his contemporaries, such as the sultans of the Marinid dynasty and others. He composed it for his heir and titled it Wasitat al-suluk fi siyasat al-muluk." This statement has led some scholars to consider the work as a mere reformulation of prior ideas, with no real political innovation from the author. Among these scholars is Azeddine al-Alam, who believes that Abu Hammu II did not develop a new political theory but simply transmitted pre-existing thought, criticizing researchers who exaggerate by presenting his book as a completely original work. On the contrary, researcher Wadad Kadi argues that Abu Hammu II was not a mere compiler but a political thinker and scholar who presented a clear and original political vision in his book. After studying the sources he used, she concluded that:

The book of Ibn Zafar is not the main source of Abu Hammu II's work in terms of frequency of borrowing, even though he did indeed borrow many pages from Sulwan al-Muta', more than from any other book. However, these borrowings are limited to three stories, all copied verbatim. Therefore, Al-Maqari's claim that Wasitat al-Suluk fi Siyasat al-Muluk is essentially a summary of Sulwan al-Muta' is unfounded

These differing views illustrate the difficulty in assessing the originality of political texts from this era, where the boundary between influence and innovation is often unclear. Thus, it is impossible to make a definitive judgment about Wasitat al-Suluk fi Siyasat al-Muluk without an in-depth study of its political discourse and an analysis of how Abu Hammu II adapted his sources. Nonetheless, there is general agreement that the book combines political elements from various traditions, notably Islamic and Persian, as the literature of mirrors for princes often relies on adapting and reformulating previous models.

Wadad Kadi further adds:

Abu Hammu II borrowed elements from Arabic political sources, but he did not follow them passively. He was able to adapt them to his own vision of power, carefully selecting what fit his political conception. If we consider that the quotes represent less than one-fifth of the book, and that the rest is his own work, we can conclude that Wasitat al-Suluk fi Siyasat al-Muluk is an original work, offering a unique political contribution.

Likewise, scholars Bouchibi Fahima and Tayeb Bousaad argue that the book is not a simple reproduction of prior ideas, but an independent political work that reflects the realities of power at the time. They emphasize that its evaluation should be historically contextualized, rather than judged by modern criteria that may lack relevance.

=== Literary style ===
Historian Abdelhamid Hadjiat notes that the literary style of the work sometimes leans toward the rhetorical style of saj', with excessive use of figures of speech, to the point where it occasionally seems artificial. However, he believes that this sophistication does not make the reading cumbersome. Abu Hammu II sought to blend literature and politics, but this approach can sometimes divert the reader from the main message of the moral narratives, which might be read as entertaining stories rather than as political teachings. Some anecdotes included in the work illustrate this style, particularly the stories of Shapur II, King of Persia, and the Arabic story of Qasir ibn Saad and al-Zabba'. This fondness for fabulous storytelling reflects the public taste of the time for stories that blend wonders with wisdom, much like One Thousand and One Nights or The Travels of Ibn Battuta, and, according to the historian, it would be unfair to criticize Abu Hammu II for this aspect, as it was a dominant style of his era, allowing writers to demonstrate their scholarship and mastery of rhetoric.

On the other hand, researcher Jad El Khannossi points out the presence of hadiths with Shiite connotations, which may be problematic in a work written by an author belonging to the Sunni orthodoxy. Another example is a narrative about Ibn Abbas, one of the great scholars of Islam, but whose story cited by Abu Hammu II does not appear in any recognized source of the prophetic tradition. However, he clarifies that this is not surprising, as Wasitat al-Suluk fi Siyasat al-Muluk belongs to the literature of the Islamic mirrors for princes genre, where political narratives do not strictly distinguish between prophetic heritage, the wisdom of Khosrow I, or the rationality of Socrates. According to historian Abdallah Laroui, this type of literature primarily serves "to justify the legitimacy of the ruler, and often puts history and philosophy at the service of the current power".

In this tradition, many stories are drawn from the classical heritage, whether Byzantine, Persian, or Islamic, and are repeated in various similar works without critical analysis. This can be explained by the medieval intellectual context, where the critical method was absent, unlike modern standards in historical research and text analysis.

== See also ==
- Mirrors for princes
- Kingdom of Tlemcen
- Zahr al-Bustan fi Dawlat Bani Ziyan

== Bibliography ==
=== Books ===
- Gaspar, Mariano (1899). El collar de perlas, obra que trata de política y administración, por Muza II, Rey de Tremecén (in Spanish). p. 549.
- Abdelhamid, Hadjiat (1974). أبو حمو موسى الزياني، حياته وآثاره (in Arabic). SNED. p. 412.
- Boutar'a, Mahmoud (2012). Wasitat al-suluk fi siyasat al-muluk, Abu Hammu Mussa II (in Arabic). Dar Chaymae & Dar Al-Numan. p. 304. ISBN 978-9931-302-14-8.
- Mastu, Abdelghani Mohammed Ali (2015). Wasitat al-suluk fi siyasat al-muluk, Abu Hammu Mussa II (in Arabic). Markaz Ibn al-Azraq. p. 485. ISBN 9786030176007.
- Khalaf, Mohammed Mahmoud (2020). Wasitat al-suluk fi siyasat al-muluk, Abu Hammu Mussa II. Dar Al-Kutub Al-Ilmiyya. p. 334. ISBN 9782745192080.
- Vanz, Jennifer (2020). "Chapitre I. Écrire l'histoire d'une capitale : Tlemcen dans l'historiographie abdelwadide". L'invention d'une capitale : Tlemcen (in French). Éditions de la Sorbonne. pp. 61–123. doi:10.4000/books.psorbonne.86907. ISBN 9782745192080.

=== Theses ===
- Gharbi, Mohamed (2002). أصول الفلسفة السياسية و الأخلاقية في كتاب واسطة السلوك في سياسة الملوك لأبي حمو موسى الزياني الثاني [The Foundations of Political and Ethical Philosophy in the Book Wasitat al-Suluk fi Siyasat al-Muluk by Abu Hamou Mussa II Zayani] (PDF) (in Arabic). Université d'Alger. p. 201.
- Amandine, Lefol (2019). Théorie et pratique du gouvernement : le miroir des princes d'Abū Ḥammū Mūsā l-Zayyānī (m. 791/1389): édition critique et analyse du Wāsiṭat al-sulūk fī siyāsat al-mulūk (in French). Sorbonne University.
- Belaïdi, Souhila (2020). واسطة السلوك في سياسة الملوك لأبي حمو موسى الثاني الزياني – دراسة أسلوبية [Wasitat al-Suluk fi Siyasat al-Muluk, Abu Hammu Mussa II Zayani – A Stylistic Study] (PDF) (in Arabic). Université de Biskra. p. 274.
- El Khannossi, Jad (2023). (Wāsiṭat al-sulūk fī siyāsat al-mulūk) 'La perla preciosa sobre la instrucción de los príncipes' del sultán de Tremecén Abū Ḥammū Mūsà (d. 1389) edition, translation, and study (PDF) (in Spanish). Cadiz.

=== Academic articles ===
- Wadad, Kadi (1975). "النظرية السياسية للسلطان أبي حمو الزياني الثاني ومكانها بين النظريات السياسية المعاصرة لها" [The Political Thought of Sultan Abu Hammu II al-Zayani and His Place Among the Political Theories of His Time]. Majalat Al-Asalah (in Arabic) (27): 7–100.
- Moqlati, Abdallah (2011). "الخطاب الإصلاحي في تلمسان خلال القرن 8هـ/14م من خلال واسطة السلوك لأبي حمو الزياني" [The Reformist Discourse in Tlemcen during the 8th Century of the Hijra / 14th Century through Wasitat al-Suluk of Abu Hammu II]. Majalat Usur Al-Jadida (in Arabic). 1 (2): 06–22.
- Ould Al-Arabi, Bilal; Wahrani, Kaddour (2017). "الفكر السياسي عند أبي حمو موسى الثاني (دراسة مقارنة بين النظرية والتطبيق)" [The Political Thought of Abu Hammu Mussa II (A Comparative Study Between Theory and Practice)]. Al-Saoura for Human and Social Studies (in Arabic). 3 (2): 95–123.
- Tahari, Amhamed (2019). "الفكر المالي عند أبي حمّو موسى الثاني (ت. 791هـ/ 1388م) من خلال واسطة السلوك في سياسة الملوك" [The Financial Thought of Abu Hammu Mussa II (791 H / 1388) Through Wasitat al-Suluk fi Siyasat al-Muluk]. Kan Historical Journal (in Arabic). 17 (63): 49–62.
- Chaaban, Reda (2022). "قواعـد الملك في فكر السّلطان أبي حمو موسى الزيّاني" [The Principles of Power in the Thought of Sultan Abu Hammu Mussa II]. Journal of Emir Abdelkader University for Islamic Sciences (in Arabic). 36 (1): 95–123.
- Toulieb, Ahmed; Abdelkader, El-Hamdi (2022). "السياسة المالية للدولة الزيانية بين التنظير والواقع من خلال كتاب أبي حمو موسى الثاني "واسطة السلوك في سياسة الملوك"" [The Financial Policy of the Zianid State Between Theory and Reality Through the Book of Abu Hammu Mussa II, Wasitat al-Suluk fi Siyasat al-Muluk]. Majalat Al-Ibrar for Historical and Archaeological Studies in North Africa (in Arabic). 5 (1): 315–344.
- Bouchibi, Fahima; Bousaad, Tayeb (2024). "التدبير السياسي في كتب الآداب السلطانية للمغرب الأوسط -واسطة السلوك لأبي حمو الزياني (723–791ه/ 1323–1379م) أنموذجا" [Political Management in the Works of Mirrors for Princes in the Central Maghreb – Wasitat al-Suluk by Abu Hammu II (723–791 H / 1323–1379 AD) as a Model]. Majalat Al-Buhuth Al-Tarikhia (in Arabic). 8 (1): 187–210.
- Bouchrit, Amhamed (2024). "المرجعية الدينية عند أبي حمو موسى الزياني من خلال كتابه واسطة السلوك" [The Religious Reference of Abu Hammu Mussa II Through His Book Wasitat al-Suluk]. Majalat Al-Mawaaqif (in Arabic). 20 (1): 92–137.
