= Siege of Béjaïa (1326–1329) =

Date	1326–1329
Location	Soummam River, Béjaïa
Result	Lifting of the siege of Béjaïa

Belligerents
Hafsid Dynasty	Kingdom of Tlemcen

Commanders and leaders
Abu Abdallah Ibn Séïd; Dafer el Kebir	Yahya Ibn Moussa; Moussa Ibn Ali Al-Kurdi; Omar Ibn Hamza; Mohamed Ibn Abu Umran

Units involved
Unknown	Unknown

Casualties and losses
Unknown	Unknown

The siege of Béjaïa was a major attempt in 1326–1329 by the Zayanids to take the city from their Hafsid rivals.

== Context ==
The Zayanid sultans carried out a policy of expansion towards the Hafsids in the east. Hafsid dissident sultans occupied the cities of Béjaïa and Constantine in the early 14th century. The assassination of Ibn Huluf, a Sanhadja chief who served as lieutenant to the Sultan of Béjaïa, by order of Constantine's pretender, Abū Yahyā Abū Bakr, pushed the Sanhadja and Dawawida, traditional allies of Béjaïa, to rally the Zayanids. In 1313, Abu Hammou took and fortified Azeffoun during his expeditions against Béjaïa. This entrenched position served as a basis for the expedition of his successor Abu Tashfîn in 1326. The latter ascended the throne in 1319 and led the same year a first raid on Béjaïa. Attacks on this city are repeated almost every year during military campaigns that sometimes reach Annaba and the borders of present-day Tunisia.

According to the expeditions, Béjaïa is threatened by the progressive construction of forts in the soummam valley including two first forts, two days walk from the city, built by in 1321 at a place called Hisn Bakr ou Hisn Taggar .

The Zayanid sultan Abu Tashfîn encouraged quarrels among his enemies: he fuelled divisions within the Hafsids by supporting puppet pretenders and supported the rebellious Arab tribes. He even went during his campaigns to temporarily take Tunis in 1324–1325, but without succeeding in bringing down Béjaïa.

== Siege ==
In 1326, the Zayanids established the fortress of Temzezdekt one day's march from Béjaïa. Its name is deliberately reminiscent of an ancient Zayanid citadel in the border region of Oujda. This fortress can hold 3,000 men and marks the blocking of the communications of the city which suffers, as a result, a famine and remains cut off from any Hafsid reinforcement from Constantine or Tunis. Finally, at the most critical moment for the besieged city, in 1329, Abu Tashfîn built a stronghold in Al Yakuta, at the mouth of the Soummam. The Hafsids tried multiple times to end the siege: one in 1327 and another in 1329 but without any success.

== Consequences ==
These episodes of repeated sieges pushed the Hafsid sultan Abū Yahyā Abū Bakr to conclude an alliance with the Marinid sultan Abu Al Hasan against the Ziyanids as early as 1329. In the spring of 1331, the latter launched a campaign on Tlemcen while the Hafsids on their side destroyed the Ziyanid strongholds of the Summmam valley.

== See also ==
- Battle of Temzezdekt
- Battle of er Rias
- Capture of Tunis (1329)
