= Battle of Temzezdekt =

1327 battle

- Part of Siege of Béjaïa (1326-1329)
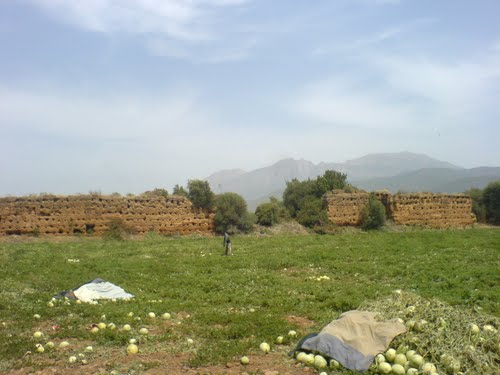
- Fortress of Temzezdekt
Date	1327
Location	Temzezdekt, near Béjaïa
Result	Zayyanid Victory

Belligerents
Hafsid Dynasty	Kingdom of Tlemcen

Commanders and leaders
Abu Abdallah Ibn Séïd; Dafer el Kebir (KIA)	Moussa Ibn Ali Al-Kurdi

Units involved
Unknown	Unknown

Casualties and losses
Unknown	Unknown

The Battle of Temzezdekt took place in 1327, near the fortress of Temzezdekt, not far from the city of Béjaïa in Algeria, between the Hafsid general Abu Abdallah Ibn Seid en-Nas against the army of the Zayanids commanded by Moussa Ibn Ali.

== Context ==
In 1326, the Zayanid sultan Abu Tashfîn ordered Musa Ibn Ali Al-Kurdi, commander of his army, to invade the Hafsid territories. The latter attacked Constantine and devastated the neighboring lands, then turned to Bejaia and besieged it. However, he soon broke camp in order to find a better position from which to besiege the city; it was in a place called Souk-el Khamis, in the valley of Bejaïa, that the Zayinid general decided to build a fortress in order to continue the blockade on Béjaïa. This fortress was completed in forty days and took the name of Temzezdekt.

== Battle ==
In 1327, the Hafsid caliph Abu Yahya Abu Bakr sent an army under the command of Abu Abdallah Ibn Seid en-Nas, against the fortress of Temzezdekt. Moussa Al-Kurdi learns of their approach and gathers his troops, the two armies meeting near the fortress, with the resulting battle ending in the defeat of the Hafsids.

== Consequences ==
The defeat of Abu Abdallah led to the capture of his camp by the Zayanids and the death of the leader of the Christian converts who guarded the port of the ruler of Tunis, Dafer el-Kebir. Abu Abdallah then barricaded himself behind the walls of Bejaia.

== See also ==
- Siege of Béjaïa (1326-1329)
- Battle of er Rias
- Capture of Tunis (1329)
