= Battle of al-Riyyas =

- Part of Siege of Béjaïa (1326-1329)
Date	1329
Location	er-Rias, Mermadjenna
Result	Zayyanid Victory

Belligerents
Hafsid Dynasty	Kingdom of Tlemcen

Commanders and leaders
Abu Yahya Abu Bakr II	Yahya Ibn Moussa; Mohamed Ibn Abu Amran; Omar Ibn Hamza

Units involved
Unknown	Unknown

The Battle of al-Riyyas took place in 1329, in er-Rias near a town named Mermadjenna in the land of the Hawwars. It was fought between the troops of the Hafsid caliph, Abu Yahya Abu Bakr, and the army of the Zayanid sultan, Abu Tashfîn, commanded by Yahya Ibn Moussa and Omar Ibn Hamza (leader of the nomadic tribes of Ifriqiya) as well as the Hafsid prince Mohamed Ibn Abu Umran, who had been the governor of Tripoli. The prince was declared caliph of the Hafsids and the army marched east.

== Battle ==
After having had time to prepare his soldiers, Abu Yahya Abu Bakr set out to intercept Abu Tashfîn's army. The two armies faced each other in er-Rias in the land of the Hawwars. Abu Tashfîn's army feinted a retreat to lure the Hafsid army into mountainous terrain, where they could take advantage of their position. Arab contingents of the Hafsid army joined the Ziyanids, contributing to their victory.

== Consequences ==
The Hafsid sultan was wounded during the battle, and the women of his family and his two sons, Ahmed and Omar, fell into the hands of the Ziyanids and were sent to Tlemcen. Abu Yahya took refuge in Constantine or Annaba. Following this victory, the Ziyanids marched on Tunis and occupied it.

== See also ==
- Siege of Béjaïa (1326-1329)
- Battle of Temzezdekt
- Capture of Tunis (1329)
