= Siege of Tlemcen (1335–1337) =

Military operation against the Zayyanid kingdom

Date	1335–1337
Location	Tlemcen, Zayyanid Kingdom
Result	Marinid victory
Territorial changes	Temporary occupation of the Zayyanid Kingdom by the Marinid Sultanate

Belligerents
Marinid Sultanate	Zayyanid Kingdom

Commanders and leaders
Abu Al-Hasan	Abu Tashufin I

Units involved
Unknown	Unknown

The siege of Tlemcen from 1335 to 1337 was a military operation undertaken by the Marinid Sultan Abu al-Hasan Ali ibn Othman against the capital of the Zayyanid Kingdom. The siege began in 1335, and ended with the fall of the city to the Marinids in 1337. The Zayyanid Sultan Abu Tashufin and his three sons died in battle. The victory of Abu al-Hasan led to the annexation of the Kingdom of Tlemcen to the Marinid Empire for more than a decade.
