= Zahr al-Bustan fi Dawlat Bani Ziyan =

14th-century Arabic historical book

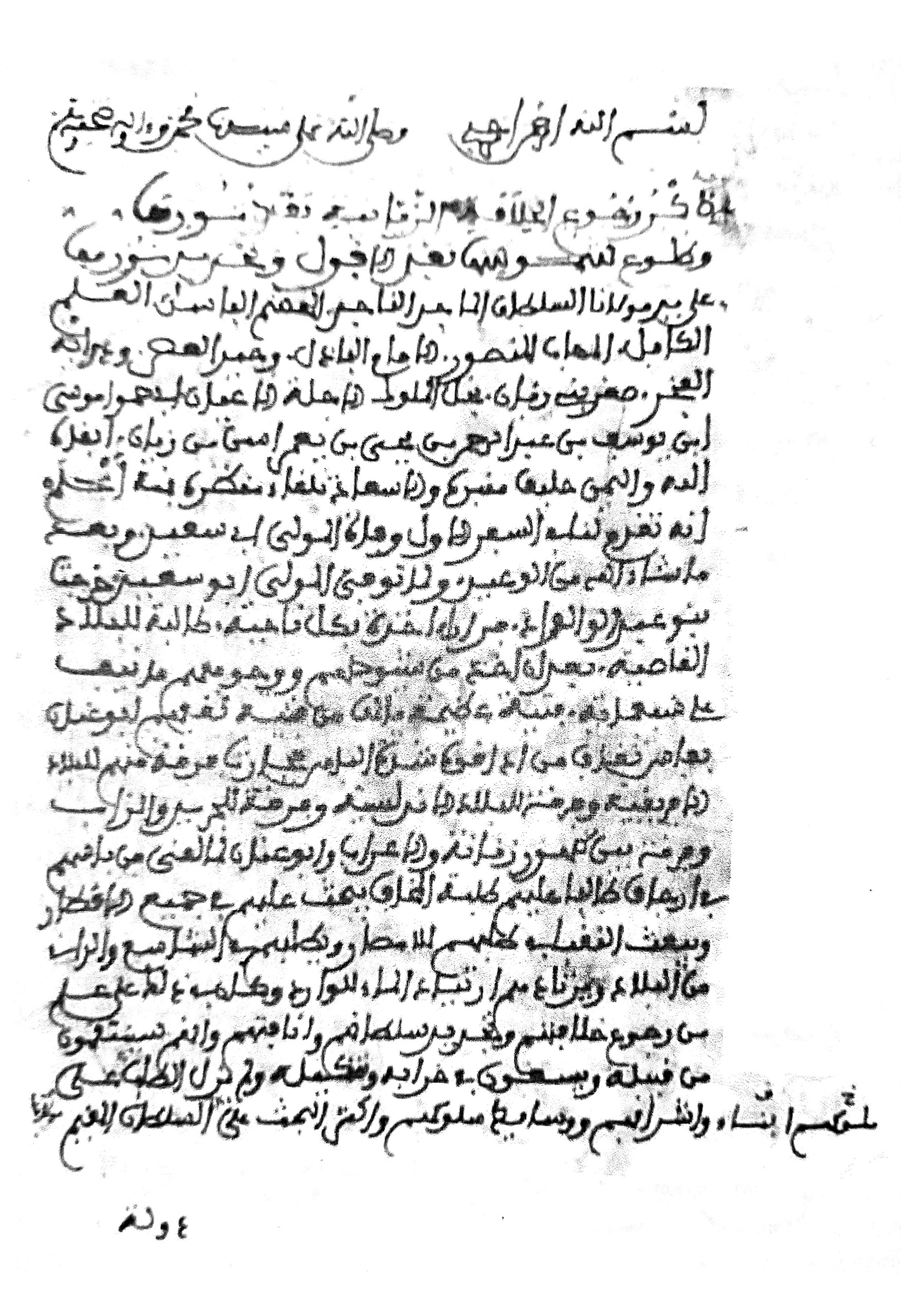
First page of the existing manuscript (second volume) of the book

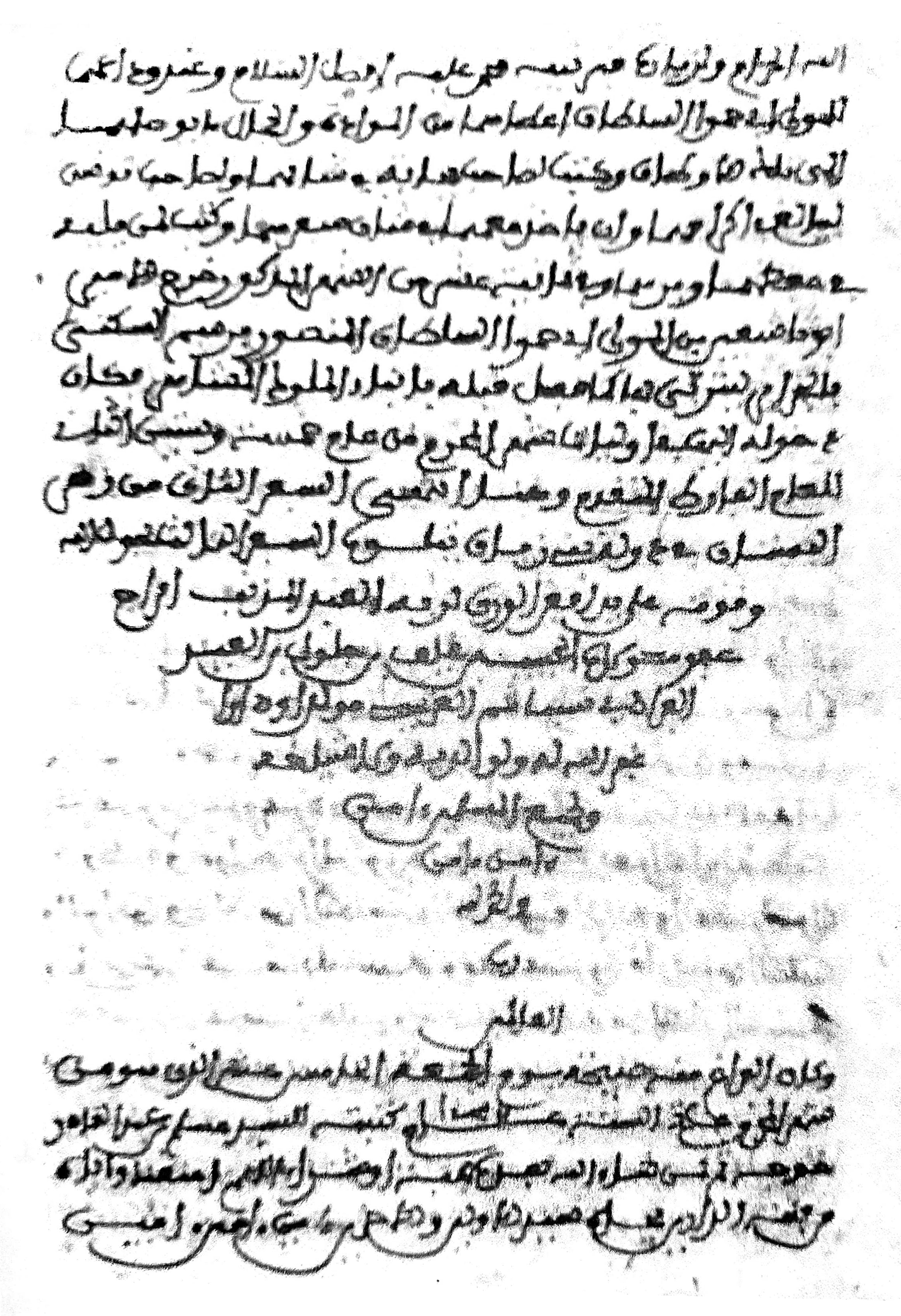
Last page of the manuscript

Zahr al-Bustan fi Dawlat Bani Ziyan (Arabic: زهر البستان في دولة بني زيان, lit. 'Flower of the Garden Concerning the Kingdom of the Sons of Ziyan'), is an Arabic historical book by an unknown author, dating to the 14th century (the 7th century of the Hijra), which documents the Kingdom of Tlemcen in the Maghreb and its relations with its neighbors, particularly during the reign of the Zayyanid Sultan Abu Hammu II. The book consists of three volumes (parts), but only the second part is available, while the first and third parts are considered lost as of today. The only surviving manuscript copy of the second volume of this book, which dates to 1819 (1235 AH), is held at the John Rylands Library in Manchester, England.

The existence of this manuscript was publicized in 1973 by Algerian scholar Mahmoud Agha Bouayed, after its discovery by Abdelhamid Hadjiat a specialist in Islamic history, through an article published in the Arabic journal at-Thaqafa. Since then, the manuscript has undergone examinations, revisions and annotations, and its text has been published in three editions. It is assumed that the author of this book was a historian at the Zayyanid Sultan's court, before the appointment of Yahya Ibn Khaldun (brother of Ibn Khaldun). Bouayad estimates that the book was written between 1362 and 1368 (764-769 AH).

This book, along with other works such as Bughiyat al-Ruwad by Yahya Ibn Khaldun, Turjuman al-Ibar by his brother Abdurrahman Ibn Khaldun, and Nadm al-Durr wa al-Aqiyan fi Bayan Sharaf Banu Ziyan by al-Tanasi, is one of the primary sources that documented the history of the kingdom of Tlemcen and the Maghreb region. This second volume of the book is notable for its documentation of numerous political, social, and cultural events, as well as the recording of literary works such as poetry and prose. However, despite its importance, the book has some flaws, notably the exaggeration in glorifying Sultan Abu Hammu II.

== Manuscript ==
Mahmoud Agha Bouayad, who served as the first director of the National Library of Algeria after independence, brought this manuscript to light in 1973. He wrote about it in the 13th issue of the journal al-Thaqafa (The Culture), following its discovery by Abdelhamid Hadjiat. The journal also noted that researcher Abdelhamid Hajiyat had begun studying and examining the manuscript at the time.

There is only one copy of this manuscript, representing the second volume (part) of the book, while the first and third volumes are considered lost. The copy is preserved at the John Rylands Library in Manchester, England, under the category of Arabic manuscripts, with the identification : Arabic ms. 283 [796]. This manuscript was donated to the library in 1905 by David S. Garson, whose name appears on a label affixed to the first page of the manuscript. Before he owned it, the manuscript belonged to John M. Duffield, whose name is signed on page 1A.

The manuscript measures 300 x 210 millimeters and contains 94 pages, with each page containing 23 lines. The covers are made of reddish-brown leather, with central green decorations. The title, as mentioned on the colophon, is: Zahr al-Bustan fi Dawlat Bani Ziyan (Flower of the Garden in the Kingdom of the Zayyanids). The Algerian university later obtained a microfilmed copy of this manuscript.

The manuscript was written in a lower-quality Maghrebi script, with variations in the writing of the hamza. There are also additions in [brackets], indicating that they were inserted by the copyist rather than the author. According to researcher Bouziani Al Daraji, the text also contains some spelling errors. Since there is only one copy, studying the text and checking place names and verifying the poetic verses becomes complex, necessitating a comparison of the text with other books in the same field, as this is the only available version.

== Author and date of writing ==
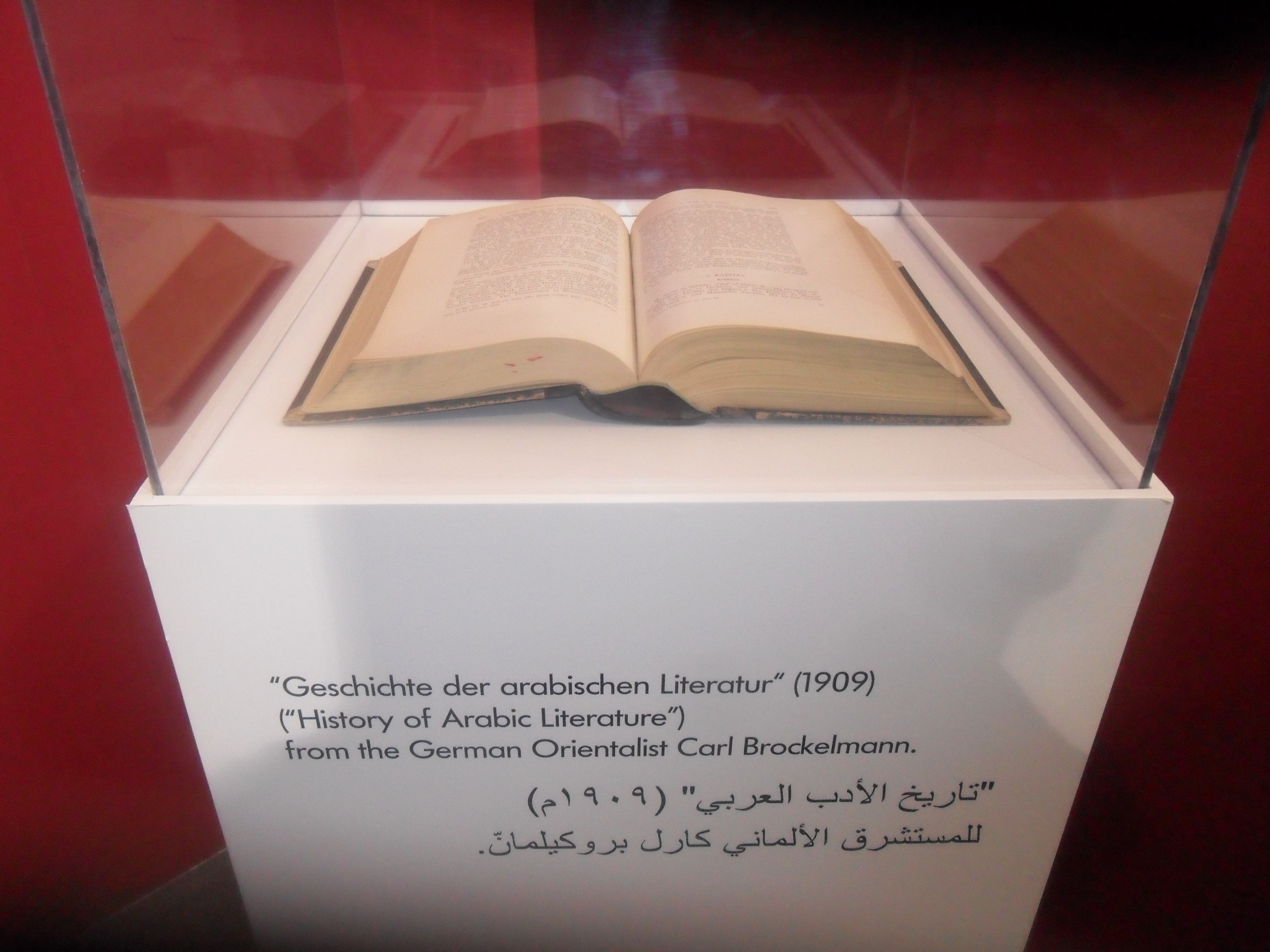
History of Arabic Literature displayed in Saudi Arabia, a major work of the orientalist Carl Brockelmann.

The real author of the book remains unknown to this day, and this work has not been mentioned by any ancient authors except for Muhammad al-Tanasi in his work Nadm al-Durr. The exact date of the manuscript's writing is not specified too. The German orientalist Carl Brockelmann mentioned in his book History of Arabic Literature that the manuscript dates to the year 1235 CE (732 H), but Mahmoud Agha-Bouayad considers this information incorrect. According to Bouayad, Brockelmann made several mistakes by copying the person who had prepared the manuscript's record at the John Rylands Library. He criticized this date, asserting that Abu Hammu II was in power between 1359 and 1389 (760 H-791 H), and that the book is mentioned in Nadm al-Durr by Al-Tanasi, completed in 1462 (868 H), which means that the date of the manuscript cannot be earlier than the reign of the sultan nor later than the writing of Al-Tanasi's work. Brockelmann also made an error by attributing the work to the copyist, thinking that the name at the end of the manuscript was that of the original author, whereas the text clearly indicates that it was the name of the copyist.

The cataloger of the manuscript made also a mistake in writing the copyist's name incorrectly. Mahmoud Agha Bouayad pointed out that the transcription was erroneous, explaining that the name of the copyist is: al-Ḥabīb ibn Yakhlef ibn Jalloul ibn al-Eid al-Farādi, from the Farādi family in Mascara (actually in western Algeria), a family known for its knowledge and scholarship. This copyist completed the transcription of the manuscript on Friday, 15 Muḥarram 1235 H (February 2, 1819), for a person named Mouslim ibn Abdelkader Khouja, and "for whomever Allah wills after him, as a gift or for sale".

According to Bouayad's estimate, this second volume of the book was certainly written during the reign of Abu Hammu II, due to the numerous references to him in the manuscript, where he is designated as Mawlana (our lord) and the minister Abdoullah ibn Mouslim as "al-Mu‘azzam" (the honorable, the most esteemed), indicating that the minister was still alive at that time. Based on this, he deduced that the book was written between 1362 and 1368 (764-769 H).

The book is divided into three volumes, with the first mentioned at the beginning of the second, and the third at the end of the final text of the second. The narration of events suggests that the author of the manuscript was a historian at the court of the Zayyanid sultan, before Yahya ibn Khaldun's appointment, because Yahya is mentioned in the text as having arrived in Tlemcen as an ambassador for the Hafsid prince of Béjaïa, Abu Abdallah al-Hafsi. Selma Kasbadji suggests that, based on the dialogues at the Marinid palace and details about the sieges, it's plausible the author was a former Marinid official who later joined Abu Hammu II’s court. He may also have been part of the entourage of ‘Abd Allah Ben Muslim al-Zardali, who became Abu Hammu II's vizier in September 1359 CE (760 H).

The researchers tried to guess the content of the lost first and third volumes, and the suggestions were as follows:

- First volume: The author may have documented the origins of the Kingdom of Tlemcen, its establishment, and its ruling sultans, as suggested by the opening remarks of the second volume: "...know that in the first volume, we concluded with the death of Mawla Abū Sa‘īd, and after what God willed..."
- Second volume: This section, found in the surviving manuscript, primarily focuses on the Kingdom of Tlemcen during the reign of Sultan Abu Hammu II.
- Third volume: The content of this volume remains uncertain, but it is possible that the author continued to document the rule of the sultan until the final days of his reign.

== Book importance ==
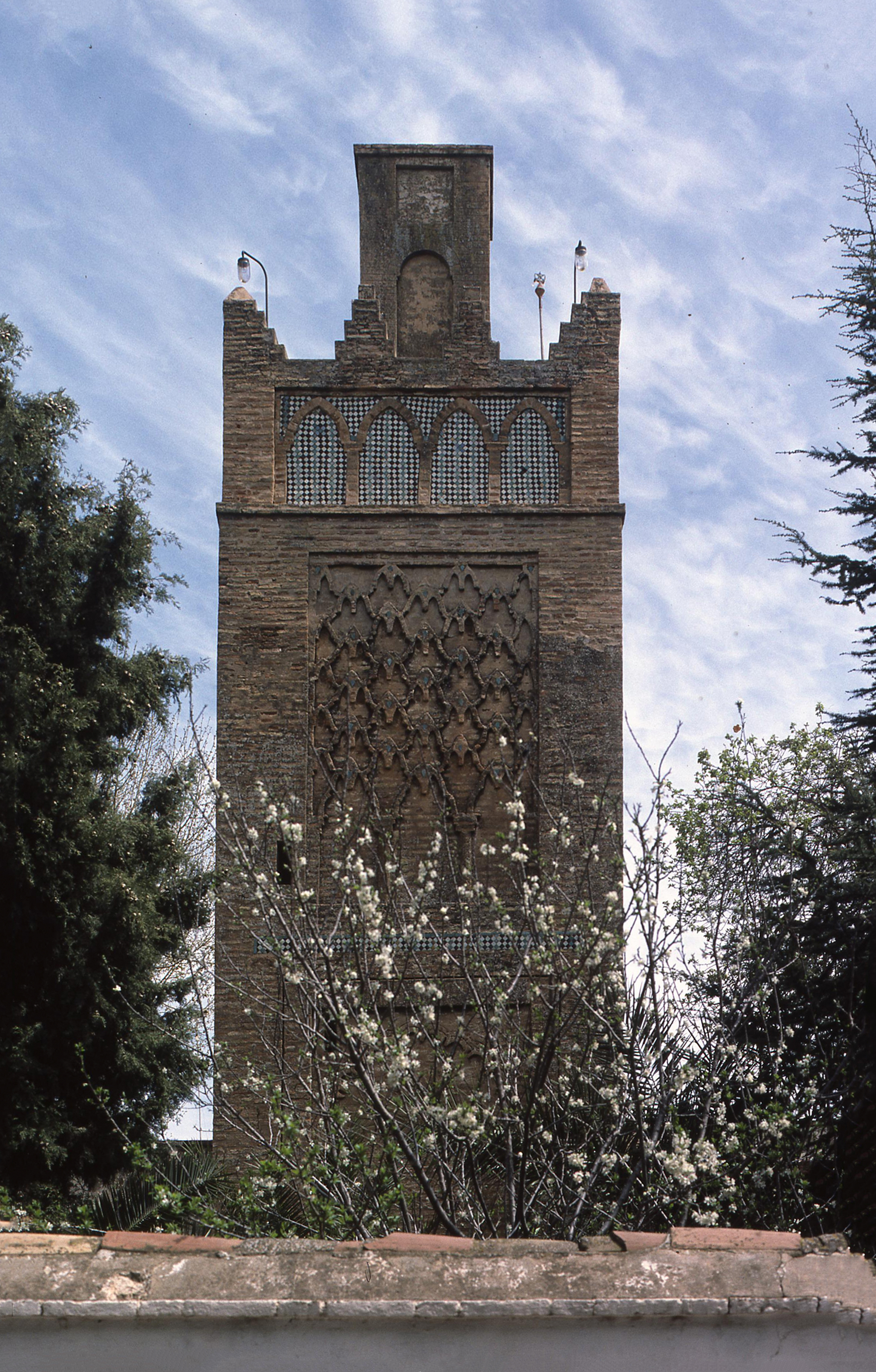
Minaret of the Mosque of Sidi Brahim al-Masmoudi in Tlemcen, erected by order of Sultan Abu Hammu II. Collection of André Raymond, 1980

The manuscript documents the history of the kingdoms of the Maghreb and Al-Andalus, particularly the Kingdom of Tlemcen under the reign of Sultan Abu Hammu II. during a period of prosperity. It covers political, social, and cultural aspects of that era, emphasizing the relations between the Zayyanids and neighboring kingdoms. The manuscript also provides information about the tribes of the Maghreb. Additionally, it describes the celebrations and religious rituals held at the sultan's court. It includes examples of literary production, both in poetry and prose.

The importance of the second volume of the book lies in its documentation of events that Yahya ibn Khaldun did not elaborate in details on in his work Bughiyat al-Ruwad, thereby enhancing its value as a historical source for this period. Its significance is even greater since it is the only existing copy, with the other two volumes lost. Bouayad believes that if the first and third volumes had not been lost, this work would have been the primary historical reference on the kingdom.

One of the criticisms attributed to the author of the text is an excessive glorification of the sultan, focusing on his victories while omitting any mention of his defeats or anything that could harm his reputation. Researcher Bouziani Daraji considers that the author of the manuscript had a lower level of scholarship than Yahya ibn Khaldun, describing him as "limited in knowledge and lacking in resources". He also criticizes his style, which he likens more to that of a storyteller than a real historian.

== Editions ==
The manuscript has been examined, studied, and edited three times by researchers, two from Tlemcen: Abdelhamid Hadjiat, Mohamed Ben Ahmed Baghli, and Bouziani Al-Daraji, a researcher from Biskra. The editions were carried out as follows:

Edition by Abdelhamid Hajiyat
The journal Al-Thaqafa, in its issue 13 of 1973, mentioned that the researcher was in the process of editing and annotating the book at that time. The text of the manuscript was published in a special edition by the publishing house Alam al-Ma‘rifa in 2011, consisting of 188 pages with a supplement of poems, including a condolence poem for Sultan Abu Hammu Musa II following the death of his father, Abu Ya‘qub Yusuf.

Edition by Bouziani Daraji
The researcher conducted another edition with the assistance of his cousin Bouzian Taher Younes, after obtaining a digitized copy of the manuscript from England. The work was published on 399 pages in 2013 and included 1,472 footnotes, with at least one note per page. At the end of the book, two appendices were added: the first about the oath of Abd al-Rahman I, and the second a lengthy poem by the physician of Tlemcen Muhammad ibn Abi Jumaa al-Tilasi.

Edition by Mohamed Ben Ahmed Baghli
After obtaining a digitized copy, the researcher studied and analyzed the text during scientific meetings held at the khoulwa (spiritual retreat) of Muhammad ibn Yusuf al-Sanusi in Tlemcen. The book was published by Dar al-Assala with the support of the Algerian Ministry of Culture during the events of Tlemcen, Capital of Islamic Culture, in 2011. This version included an index of names, tribes, places, as well as poems and poetry, with three annexes added from the works of Yahya Ibn Khaldun and his brother Abderhaman.

== See also ==
- Wasitat al-suluk fi siyasat al-muluk
