= Capture of Tunis (1329) =

- Part of Siege of Béjaïa (1326-1329)
Date	November–December 1329
Location	Tunis
Result	Hafsids become vassals of the Zayyanids for less than one year.

Belligerents
Hafsid Dynasty	Kingdom of Tlemcen

Commanders and leaders
Unknown	Yahya Ibn Moussa; Mohamed Ibn Abu Umran

Units involved
Unknown	Unknown

Casualties and losses
Unknown	Unknown

The capture of Tunis was a battle in which the Ziyyanid army, under the command of Yahya Ibn Moussa and the Hafsid pretender Mohamed Ibn Abu Amran, took possession of Tunis as part of the Ziyyanid campaigns in Ifriqiya during the reign of Sultan Abu Tâshfîn.

== Context ==
After his defeat at the battle of er Rais, the Hafsid caliph took refuge in Annaba. The Zianid army, under the command of General Yahya Ibn Moussa, marched on Tunis accompanied by the pretender to the Hafsid throne, Mohamed Ibn Abu Umran.

== Consequences ==
In November–December 1329, Tunis fell to the attackers and was then ruled by Mohamed Ibn Abu Umran and Ziyyanid general Yahya Ibn Moussa who made the Hafsid dynasty their vassals. However, Abu Umran's rule did not last long. In May 1330 the Hafsid Sultan Abu Yahya Abu Bakr sought the help of the Merinids to regain possession of his kingdom.

== See also ==
- Siege of Béjaïa (1326-1329)
- Battle of Temzezdekt
- Battle of er Rias
