= Abraham Lévy-Bacrat =

Spanish rabbi (fl. 1492–1507)

Abraham Lévy-Bacrat (אברהם הלוי בקראט; fl. 1492–1507) was a rabbinical author of the beginning of the sixteenth century. Expelled from Spain in 1492, he settled at Tunis, where in 1507 he wrote Sefer ha-Zikkaron, a supercommentary on Rashi. The manuscript remained unprinted until 1845, when it was discovered in a Jewish library in Tunis.

One of the prefaces to the work, written by Lévy-Bacrat himself, recounts his sufferings during the expulsion from Spain. The historian Haim Beinart cites the following passage from his account:

And they all left, about two hundred thousand by foot, men and women and children, spread out over the mountains and the seas like a flock with no shepherd. And our enemy took pleasure in our grief, saying, these people have no Lord. And of that general number we arrived in the kingdom of Tlemcen with twelve thousand souls. And at that time there fell from the nation three thousand people, bodies dying from great worry.

== Jewish Encyclopedia bibliography ==
- David Cazès, Notes Bibliographiques sur la Littérature Juive Tunisienne
