= Wadad Kadi =

Lebanese scholar of Arabic and Islamic civilizations

Wadad Afifi Kadi
- Born: November 23, 1943 (age 82); Lebanon
- Education: American University of Beirut, University of Tübingen
- Occupations: Scholar, Professor
- Employer: University of Chicago
- Known for: Scholar of Arabic and Islamic civilizations
- Title: Avalon Foundation Distinguished Service Professor Emerita of Islamic Studies

Wadad Afifi Kadi (born November 23, 1943) is a Lebanese scholar of Arabic and Islamic civilizations and the Avalon Foundation Distinguished Service Professor Emerita of Islamic Studies in Near Eastern Languages and Civilizations at the University of Chicago.

== Biography ==
Wadad Kadi was born in Lebanon on November 23, 1943. She earned her BA and MA in Arabic Literature at the American University of Beirut, then went on to pursue doctoral studies at the University of Tübingen in Germany, before finishing her Ph.D. at the American University of Beirut. She has taught at Yale, AUB, and the University of Chicago, as well as Harvard, Columbia, Stockholm University, and Oxford.
