= Abu Tashfin Abd al-Rahman I =

Ruler of the Tlemcen Kingdom (r. 1318–1337)

- Emir
- Modern painting depicting Abu Tashfin on horseback

Sultan of Tlemcen
- Reign: 1318–1337
- Predecessor: Abu Hammu I
- Successor: Abu Said Uthman II; Abu Thabit
- Born: 1293
- Died: 1337 (aged 43–44); Tlemcen, Kingdom of Tlemcen
- Issue: Abu Said Uthman II; Abu Thabit; Abu Hammu II
Names
- Abû Tâshfîn Ibn Abu Hammou Moussa al-Awal
- House: Zayyanid
- Father: Abu Hammu Musa I
- Religion: Sunni Islam

Abu Tashfin Abd al-Rahman I (Arabic : أبو تاشفين ابن أبو حمو موسى الأول; Abu Tashufin Abd al Rahman ibn Abu Musa Al-awal), was the 5th Sultan of the Zayyanid dynasty ruling the Kingdom of Tlemcen from 1318 until his death in 1337.

== Biography ==
He was the son of Abu Hammu I, the preceding Sultan of Tlemcen who he overthrew and killed in 1318.

In 1329, he led his forces east into Ifriqiya. He captured Algiers. In the Battle of er-Rais the Zayyanids defeated the Hafsids. They then occupied the Hafsid capital, Tunis.

Abu Tashufin then faced an alliance between Marinids and Hafsids which had been established through the marriage of a Hafsid princess to Abu al-Hasan, Sultan of Marinids. This led to the siege of Tlemcen from 1335-1337. Abu Tashufin I was killed during the siege of Tlemcen by the Marinids and the Hafsids.

The Zayyanids were the first to sponsor of the construction of madrasas in their part of the Maghreb, and among the most famous in Tlemcen was the Tashfiniya Madrasa founded by Abu Tashufin.

== Expedition into the Hafsid Kingdom ==
Abu Tashfin undertook the siege of the city of Béjaïa and ordered the construction of the citadel-city of Temzezdekt (meaning "the purifier" in the Berber language) as a tribute to the former stronghold of Yaghmurasen ibn Zyan in Morocco. At the same time, he dispatched a second army to seize Tunis; this force defeated the Hafsid sultan, Abu Yahya Abu Bakr II, and compelled him to take refuge in Constantine or in Bône. The Zayyanid army thus occupied the city of Tunis

== Siege of Tlemcen ==
The Marinid sultan of the Maghreb al-Aqsa (Morocco) Abu al-Hasan Ali ibn Uthman was married to a Hafsid princess, and in 1334 the Hafsids asked him for help, giving him an excuse to invade the Maghreb al-Awsaṭ and Ifriqiya (present-day Algeria and Tunisia) In early 1335, the Marinid forces, led by Abu al-Hasan, invaded the Kingdom of Tlemcen from the west, at the same time the sultan sent a naval force to aid the Hafsids in the east. Abu al-Hassan besieged Tlemcen for nearly three years.

In 1337, Abu al-Hassan was forced to suspend the siege of Tlemcen because of his brother, Abu Ali, who had proclaimed himself independent sultan of Sigilmassa, and threatened to divide the Merinid dominions into two.

In May 1337, after defeating his brother, he re-besieged Tlemcen, who surrendered to the Marinids. Abu Tashfin and three of his sons died during the final assault. His brothers were captured and put to death, and then the Kingdom of Tlemcen (which included about half of present-day Algeria) was annexed to the dominions of the Marinids. Abu al-Hassan received delegates from Egypt, Granada, Tunis, and Mali, who congratulated him on his victory, which gave him complete control of trans-Saharan trade.

The first Marinid occupation of the Kingdom of Tlemcen lasted from 1337 until 1348, when it was retaken by Abu Tashufin's sons, Abu Said Uthman and Abu Thabit.

== See also ==
- Medieval history of Algeria
