= Abu Hammu Musa II =

Zayyanid ruler (r. 1359–1389)

- Amir al-Mu'minin
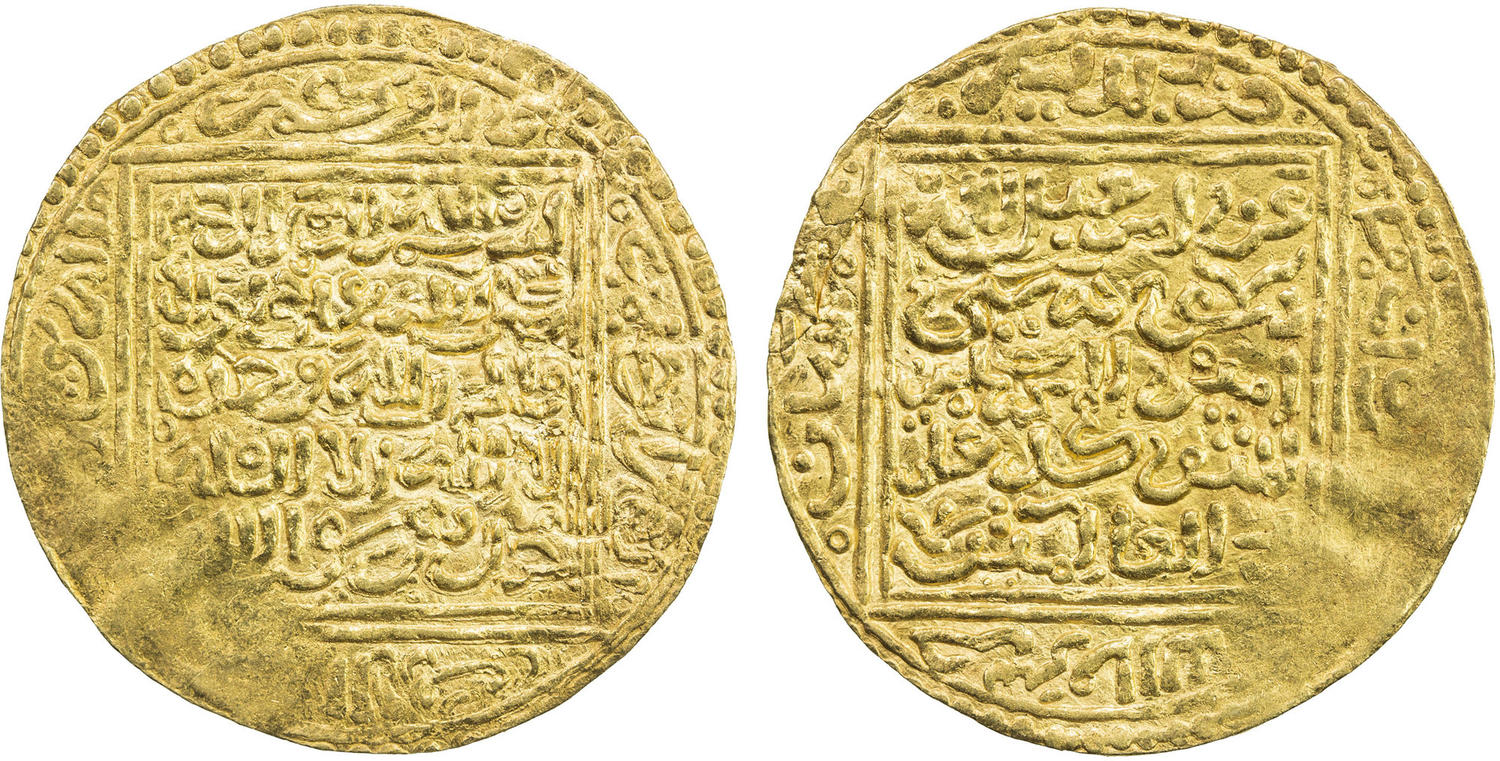
- Gold dinar of Abu Hammu II

8th Sultan of the Kingdom of Tlemcen
- Reign: 9 January 1359 – 1389
- Predecessor: Abu Thabit
- Successor: Abu Tashufin II
- Born: c. 1324; Granada, Emirate of Granada
- Died: 1389 (aged 65) near Tlemcen, Kingdom of Tlemcen
- Issue: Abu Tashufin II; El Montacer; Abou Zian Mohammed; Omar
- Dynasty: Abd al-Wadid (Zayyanid)
- Father: Abu Ya'qub Yusuf
- Religion: Islam
- Arabic name
- Personal (Ism): Musa موسى
- Patronymic (Nasab): ibn Yusuf ابن يوسف
- Teknonymic (Kunya): Abu Hammu أبو حموا

Abu Hammu Musa II (Arabic: أبو حمو موسى الثاني) (died 1389) was a Zayyanid sultan of the Kingdom of Tlemcen in Algeria in the 14th century.

Also known as Abu Hammu Musa II he first came to power in Tlemcen and surrounding area with the expulsion of the Merinids in 1359. The following year Abu Hammu was succeeded in power by Abu Zayyan Muhammad II ibn Uthman. Before 1360 was over though Abu Hammu returned to power. He was again succeeded in power by Abu Zayyan in 1370. Abu Hammu returned to power a third time in 1372. He lost power to Abu Zayyan again in 1383, but returned to power a fourth time in 1384. In 1387 Abu Zayyan again returned to power, but died that year, so Abu Hammu returned to power, and retained it until his death in 1389.

Abu Hammu was succeeded as ruler of the Zayyanid domains by Abu Tashufin Abd al-Rahman II.

== See also ==
- Zahr al-Bustan fi Dawlat Bani Ziyan
- Wasitat al-suluk fi siyasat al-muluk
