= Muqaddimah =

Book by Ibn Khaldun, written in 1377

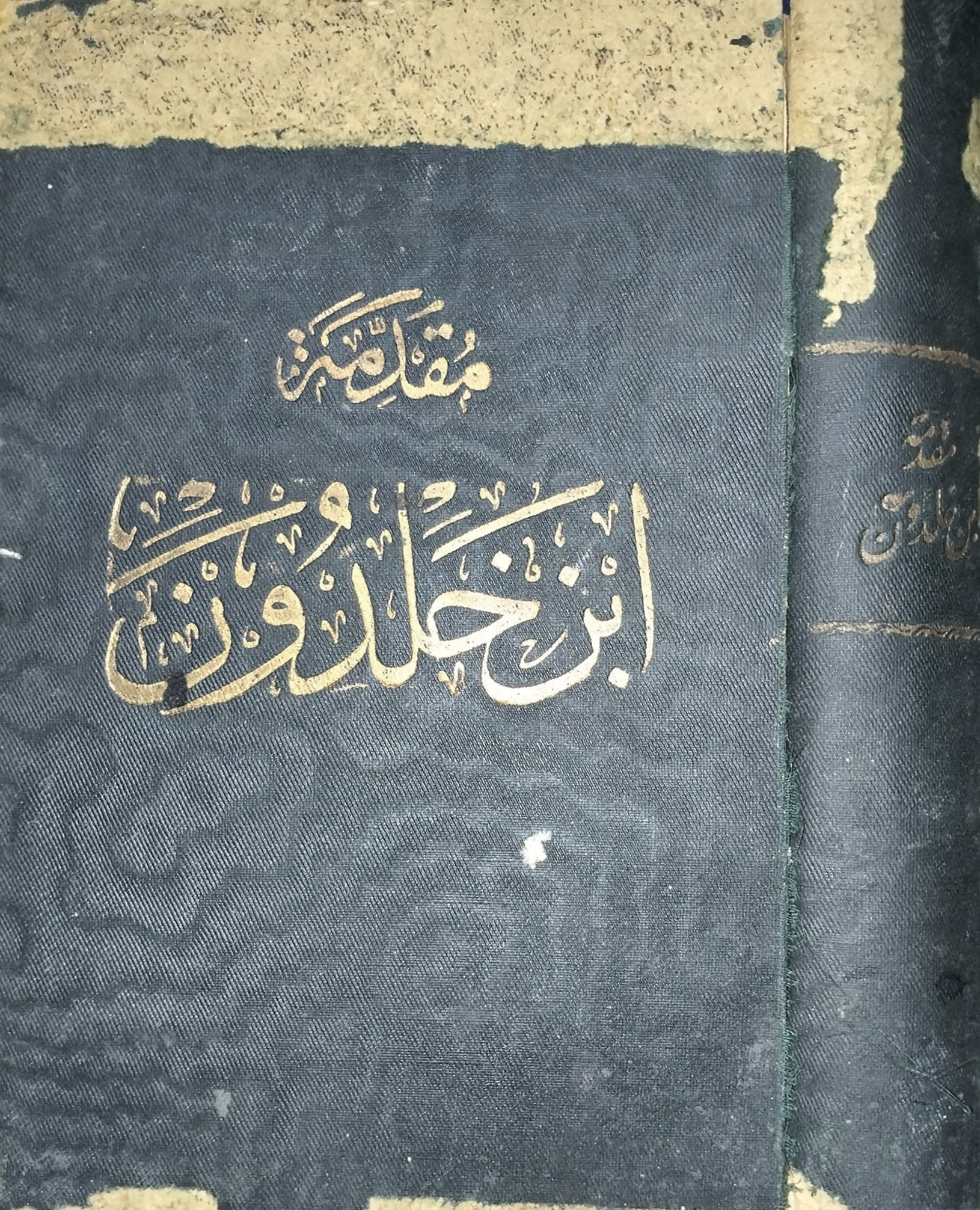
- Author: Ibn Khaldun
- Original title: مقدّمة ابن خلدون
- Language: Arabic
- Published: 1377
- English publication date: 1958
- Original text: مقدّمة ابن خلدون at Arabic Wikisource

The Muqaddimah (Arabic: مقدّمة meaning "the introduction" or "the prologomenon") is a 14th-century Arabic treatise on historiography, sociology, and the philosophy of history written by Ibn Khaldun. Some modern thinkers view it as the first work dealing with the social sciences of sociology, demography, and cultural history. The Muqaddimah also deals with Islamic theology, historiography, the philosophy of history, economics, political theory, and ecology.

Ibn Khaldun wrote the work in 1377 as the introduction and the first book of his planned work of world history, the Kitab al-ʿIbar ("Book of Lessons"; full title: Kitābu l-ʻibari wa Dīwāni l-Mubtada' wal-Ḥabar fī ayāmi l-ʻarab wal-ʿajam wal-barbar, waman ʻĀsarahum min Dhawī sh-Shalṭāni l-Akbār, i.e.: "Book of Lessons, Record of Beginnings and Events in the history of the Arabs and Foreigners and Berbers and their Powerful Contemporaries"), but already in his lifetime it became regarded as an independent work on its own.

== Etymology ==
Muqaddimah (مُقَدِّمَة) is an Arabic word used to mean "prologue" or "introduction", to introduce a larger work.

== Content ==
Ibn Khaldun starts the Muqaddimah with a thorough criticism of the mistakes regularly committed by his fellow historians and the difficulties which await the historian in his work. He notes seven critical issues:

All records, by their very nature, are liable to error...

1. ...Partisanship towards a creed or opinion...
2. ...Over-confidence in one's sources...
3. ...The failure to understand what is intended...
4. ...A mistaken belief in the truth...
5. ...The inability to place an event in its real context...
6. ...The common desire to gain favor of those of high ranks, by praising them, by spreading their fame...
7. ...The most important is the ignorance of the laws governing the transformation of human society.

Against the seventh point (the ignorance of social laws) Ibn Khaldun lays out his theory of human society in the Muqaddimah.

Sati' al-Husri suggested that Ibn Khaldun's Muqaddimah is essentially a sociological work, sketching over its six books a general sociology; a sociology of politics; a sociology of urban life; a sociology of economics; and a sociology of knowledge.

=== Scientific method ===
Ibn Khaldun often criticized "idle superstition and uncritical acceptance of historical data". As a result, he introduced the scientific method to the social sciences, which was considered something "new to his age", and he often referred to it as his "new science" and developed his own new terminology for it.

== History of the Muqaddimah ==
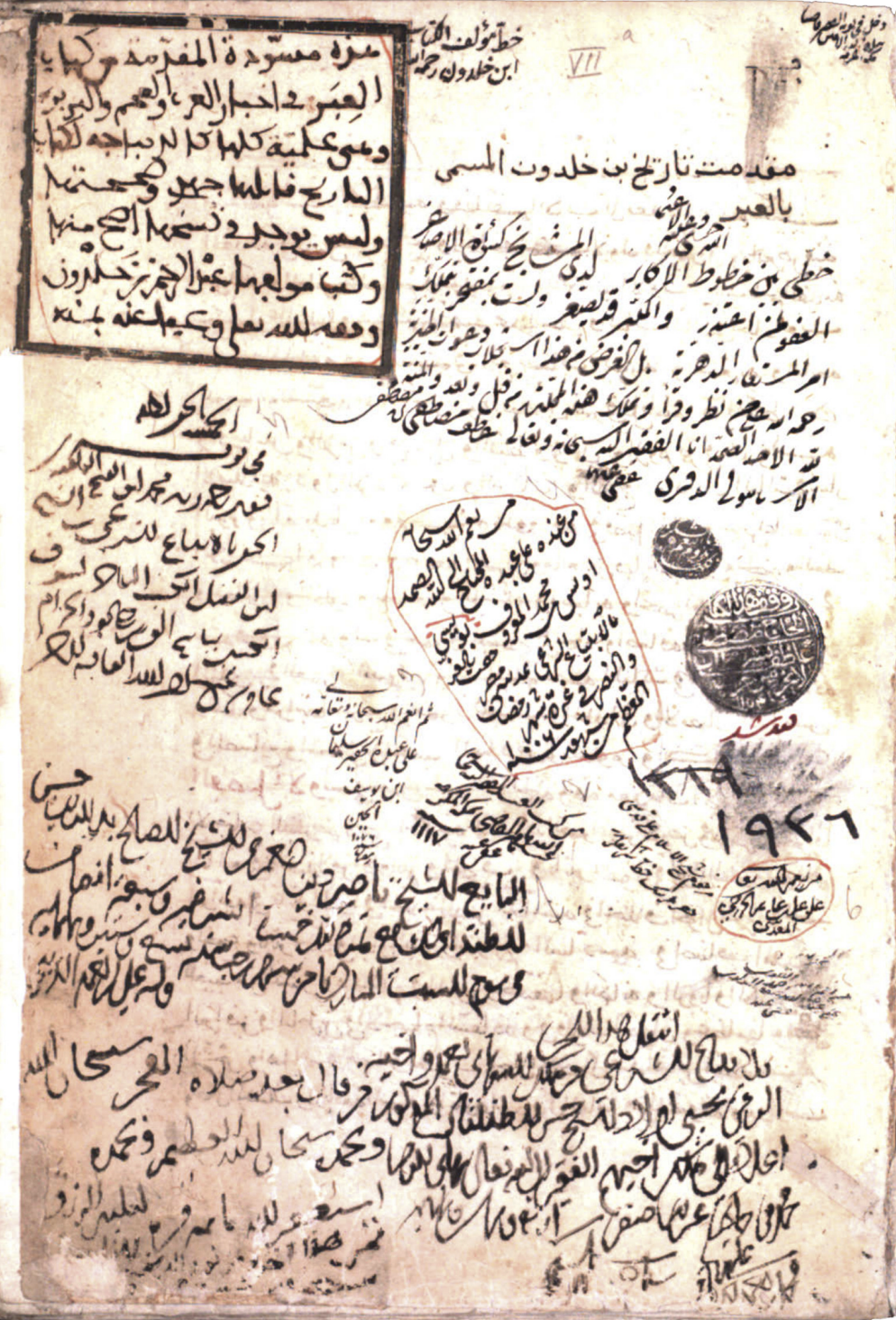
Ibn Khaldun's handwriting on the upper left corner, certifying manuscript MS C. Atif Efendi 1936, of the Atif Efendi Library

Ibn Khaldun wrote the first version of the Muqaddimah in Qalʿat ibn Salama, where he secluded himself for almost four years after withdrawing from political life. It is the first of three parts of a project he worked on for almost thirty years: his Kitab al-ʿIbar, a massive work of universal history filling seventeen volumes of 500 pages each in its modern edition. A draft of the Muqaddimah was completed in 1377. Manuscripts of the Muqaddimah copied in the lifetime of Ibn Khaldun are extant, and a number of them have autographed marginal notes or additions.

In the Muqaddimah, Ibn Khaldun expounds on a "new science" around which he had maintained secrecy up until his retirement to Qalʿat ibn Salama, a new science for the study of what he calls "ʿumrān" (عُمران). This new science, ʿilm al-ʿumrān (عِلم العُمران), was based on Greco-Arab philosophy and sought to study the evolution of humankind and society throughout history using a method that was essentially historical, empirical, rational, and demonstrative.

The Muqaddimah—shaped by Ibn Khaldun's characteristic moderation with regard to politics and religion—was met without much enthusiasm or clear hostility in the first few centuries after it was written. It was alluded to in the works of two Moroccan writers, Muḥammad Ibn al-Sakkāk (d. 1413) and Yaʿqūb b. Mūsā al-Saytānī, but Muḥammad b. ʿAlī Ibn al-Azraq (d. 1496) is apparently the only contemporary writer of the Maghreb who clearly approved of his work, quoting from it abundantly in his Badāʾiʿ al-silk fī ṭabāʾiʿ al-mulk (كتاب بدائع السلك في طبائع الملك).

It was cited more often in works from Egypt, celebrated by disciples including Al-Maqrizi (1364–1442) and Ibn ʿAmmār, and met with hostility by others such as Ibn Hajar al-Asqalani and his master Nur al-Din al-Haythami.

In the following centuries, Khaldun appeared prominently, described as an authority on political history, in numerous biographical dictionaries—especially in Ahmed Muhammad al-Maqqari's Nafḥ al-ṭīb min ghuṣn al-Andalus al-raṭīb —but the Muqaddimah remained largely absent.

Ottoman historians including Kâtip Çelebi (d. 1657) and Mustafa Naima (d. 1716) valued the social and political theories in the Muqaddimah, but did not apply them in the analysis of their own society. The first five out of six chapters were translated into Ottoman Turkish by Mehmed Pirizade (d. 1749), and the sixth chapter was translated by Ahmed Cevdet (d. 1895); the complete translation was published 1860/61.

The Muqaddimah was first printed in 1857 at the Bulaq Press in Cairo in a standalone volume made by Naṣr al-Hūrīnī, with crucial support from Rifa'a at-Tahtawi, and as the first volume in a seven-volume set of Kitab al-ʿIbar a decade later.

Abdesselam Cheddadi concludes that "the strictly scientific contribution of Ibn Khaldūn to the field of history and the social sciences was not fully recognised in the Muslim world until the late nineteenth century."

The Muqaddimah was first discovered in France through the partial Turkish translation of Mehmed Pirizade (d. 1749). In 1858, the year following the first publication in Cairo, Étienne-Marc Quatremère printed an edition of the Arabic text of the Muqaddimah in three volumes in Paris under the title Les Prolégomènes d’Ebn Khaldoun. William McGuckin de Slane published a French translation in three volumes in 1863 that Aziz al-Azmeh regards as the best translation of Ibn Khaldun's text.

An English translation was published by Franz Rosenthal in 1958.

== Sociology ==
=== ʿAsabiyyah ===
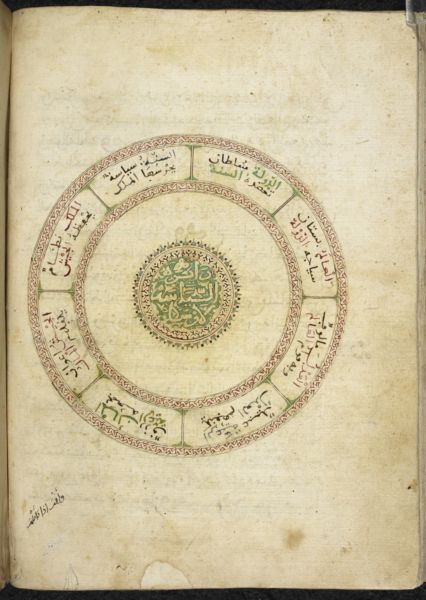
Aristotle's Circle of Justice (دائرة السياسة لأرسطو) in a 15th century manuscript of the Muqaddimah

The concept of "ʿasabiyyah" (Arabic: "tribalism, clanism, communitarism", or in a modern context, "group feeling", "social cohesion", "solidarity" or even "nationalism") is one of the best known aspects of the Muqaddimah. As this ʿasabiyyah declines, another more compelling ʿasabiyyah may take its place; thus, civilizations rise and fall, and history describes these cycles of ʿasabiyyah as they play out.

Ibn Khaldun argues that each dynasty has within itself the seeds of its own downfall. He explains that ruling houses tend to emerge on the peripheries of great empires and use the unity presented by those areas to their advantage in order to bring about a change in leadership. As the new rulers establish themselves at the center of their empire, they become increasingly lax and more concerned with maintaining their lifestyles. Thus, a new dynasty can emerge at the periphery of their control and effect a change in leadership, beginning the cycle anew.

== Economics ==
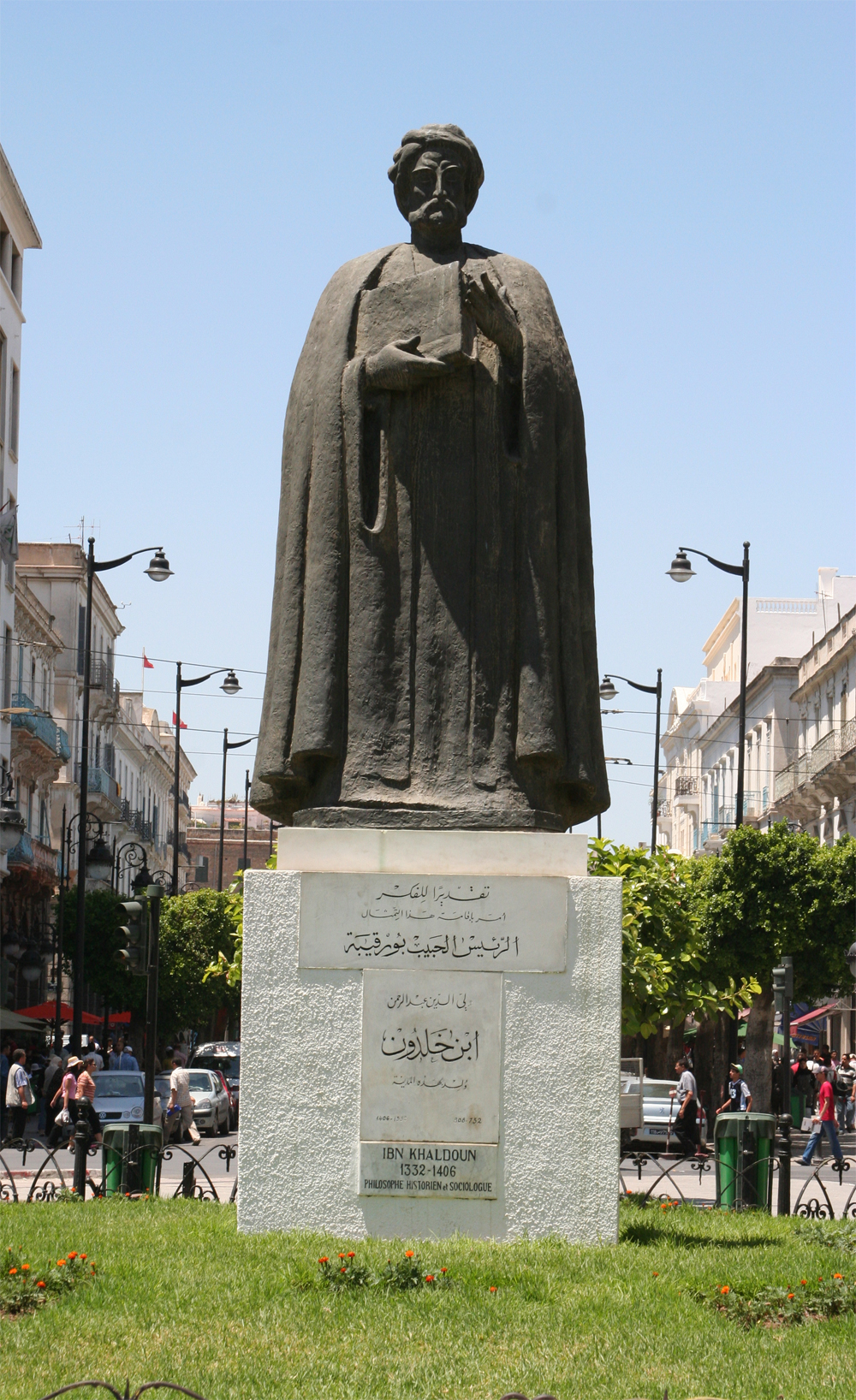
Statue of Ibn Khaldun in Tunis

Ibn Khaldun wrote on economic and political theory in the Muqaddimah, relating his thoughts on ʿasabiyyah to the division of labor: the greater the social cohesion, the more complex the division may be, the greater the economic growth:

When civilization [population] increases, the available labor again increases. In turn, luxury again increases in correspondence with the increasing profit, and the customs and needs of luxury increase. Crafts are created to obtain luxury products. The value realized from them increases, and, as a result, profits are again multiplied in the town. Production there is thriving even more than before. And so it goes with the second and third increase. All the additional labor serves luxury and wealth, in contrast to the original labor that served the necessity of life.

Ibn Khaldun noted that growth and development positively stimulate both supply and demand, and that the forces of supply and demand are what determine the prices of goods. He also noted macroeconomic forces of population growth, human capital development, and technological developments effects on development. Ibn Khaldun held that population growth was a function of wealth.

He understood that money served as a standard of value, a medium of exchange, and a preserver of value, though he did not realize that the value of gold and silver changed based on the forces of supply and demand. Ibn Khaldun also introduced the labor theory of value. He described labor as the source of value, necessary for all earnings and capital accumulation, obvious in the case of craft. He argued that even if earning "results from something other than a craft, the value of the resulting profit and acquired (capital) must (also) include the value of the labor by which it was obtained. Without labor, it would not have been acquired."

Ibn Khaldun describes a theory of prices through his understanding that prices result from the law of supply and demand. He understood that when a good is scarce and in demand, its price is high and when the good is abundant, its price is low.

The inhabitants of a city have more food than they need. Consequently, the price of food is low, as a rule, except when misfortunes occur due to celestial conditions that may affect [the supply of] food.

His theory of ʿasabiyyah has often been compared to modern Keynesian economics, with Ibn Khaldun's theory clearly containing the concept of the multiplier. A crucial difference, however, is that whereas for John Maynard Keynes it is the middle class's greater propensity to save that is to blame for economic depression, for Ibn Khaldun it is the governmental propensity to save at times when investment opportunities do not take up the slack which leads to aggregate demand.

Another modern economic theory anticipated by Ibn Khaldun is supply-side economics. He "argued that high taxes were often a factor in causing empires to collapse, with the result that lower revenue was collected from high rates." He wrote:

It should be known that at the beginning of the dynasty, taxation yields a large revenue from small assessments. At the end of the dynasty, taxation yields a small revenue from large assessments.

=== Laffer curve ===
Ibn Khaldun introduced the concept now popularly known as the Laffer curve, that increases in tax rates initially increase tax revenues, but eventually the increases in tax rates cause a decrease in tax revenues. This occurs as too high a tax rate discourages producers in the economy.

Ibn Khaldun used a dialectic approach to describe the sociological implications of tax choice (which now forms a part of economics theory):

In the early stages of the state, taxes are light in their incidence, but fetch in a large revenue ... As time passes and kings succeed each other, they lose their tribal habits in favor of more civilized ones. Their needs and exigencies grow ... owing to the luxury in which they have been brought up. Hence they impose fresh taxes on their subjects ...and sharply raise the rate of old taxes to increase their yield ... But the effects on business of this rise in taxation make themselves felt. For business men are soon discouraged by the comparison of their profits with the burden of their taxes ... Consequently production falls off, and with it the yield of taxation.

This analysis is very similar to the modern economic concept known as the Laffer curve. Laffer does not claim to have invented the concept himself, noting that the idea was present in the work of Ibn Khaldun and, more recently, John Maynard Keynes.

== Historiography ==
The Muqaddimah is also held to be a foundational work for the schools of historiography, cultural history, and the philosophy of history. The Muqaddimah also laid the groundwork for the observation of the role of state, communication, propaganda and systemic bias in history.

Franz Rosenthal wrote in the History of Muslim Historiography:

Muslim historiography has at all times been united by the closest ties with the general development of scholarship in Islam, and the position of historical knowledge in MusIim education has exercised a decisive influence upon the intellectual level of historical writing....The Muslims achieved a definite advance beyond previous historical writing in the sociological understanding of history and the systematisation of historiography. The development of modern historical writing seems to have gained considerably in speed and substance through the utilization of a Muslim Literature which enabled western historians, from the seventeenth century on, to see a large section of the world through foreign eyes. The Muslim historiography helped indirectly and modestly to shape present day historical thinking.

=== Historical method ===
The Muqaddimah states that history is a philosophical science, and historians should attempt to refute myths. Ibn Khaldun approached the past as strange and in need of interpretation. The originality of Ibn Khaldun was to claim that the cultural difference of another age must govern the evaluation of relevant historical material, to distinguish the principles according to which it might be possible to attempt the evaluation, and lastly, to feel the need for experience, in addition to rational principles, in order to assess a culture of the past. Ibn Khaldun often criticized "idle superstition and uncritical acceptance of historical data". As a result, he introduced a scientific method to the study of history, which was considered something "new to his age", and he often referred to it as his "new science", now associated with historiography.

=== Philosophy of history ===
Ibn Khaldun is considered a pioneer of the philosophy of history. Dawood writes on the Muqaddimah:

It can be regarded as the earliest attempt made by any historian to discover a pattern in the changes that occur in man's political and social organization. Rational in its approach, analytical in its method, encyclopaedic in detail, it represents an almost complete departure from traditional historiography, discarding conventional concepts and cliches and seeking, beyond the mere chronicle of events, an explanation—and hence a philosophy of history.

=== Systemic bias ===
The Muqaddimah emphasized the role of systemic bias in affecting the standard of evidence. Khaldun was quite concerned with the effect of raising the standard of evidence when confronted with uncomfortable claims, and relaxing it when given claims that seemed reasonable or comfortable. He was a jurist, and sometimes participated reluctantly in rulings that he felt were coerced, based on arguments he did not respect. Besides al-Maqrizi (1364–1442), Ibn Khaldun's focused attempt systematically to study and account for biases in the creation of history wouldn't be seen again until Georg Hegel, Karl Marx, and Friedrich Nietzsche in 19th-century Germany, and Arnold J. Toynbee, a 20th-century British historian.

Ibn Khaldun also examines why, throughout history, it has been common for historians to sensationalize historical events and, in particular, exaggerate numerical figures:

Whenever contemporaries speak about the dynastic armies of their own or recent times, and whenever they engage in discussions about Muslim or Christian soldiers, or when they get to figuring the tax revenues and the money spent by the government, the outlays of extravagant spenders, and the goods that rich and prosperous men have in stock, they are quite generally found to exaggerate, to go beyond the bounds of the ordinary, and to succumb to the temptation of sensationalism. When the officials in charge are questioned about their armies, when the goods and assets of wealthy people are assessed, and when the outlays of extravagant spenders are looked at in ordinary light, the figures will be found to amount to a tenth of what those people have said. The reason is simple. It is the common desire for sensationalism, the ease with which one may just mention a higher figure, and the disregard of reviewers and critics.

=== Military history ===
The Muqaddimah criticizes certain accounts of historical battles that appear to be exaggerated, and takes military logistics into account when questioning the sizes of historical armies reported in earlier sources. In the Introduction to the Muqaddimah, Ibn Khaldun directs this criticism towards to famous historians such as Al-Masudi, who is today regarded as the "Herodotus of the Arabs" and whom Ibn Khaldun himself regarded as one of the most famous historians up until his time.

As an example, Ibn Khaldun notes that Al-Masudi and other historians reported that Moses counted the Israelite army as 600,000 or more soldiers. Ibn Khaldun criticizes Al-Masudi for failing to take into account certain logistics, questioning whether Egypt and Syria could have possibly held such a large number of soldiers, or whether an army of that size would be able to march or fight as a unit. He notes that the whole available territory would have been too small for such a large army, and argues that if "it were in battle formation, it would extend" several times "beyond the field of vision." He questions how two such parties could "fight with each other, or one battle formation gain the upper hand when one flank does not know what the other flank is doing", and that a coordinated battle movement in such a large group "would hardly be possible". He argues that the "situation in the present day testifies to the correctness of this statement" since the "past resembles the future more than one drop of water another". He then compares it to the Persian Sasanian Empire, noting that it was far more vast than the Israelite Kingdom and yet the size of the military of the Sasanian Empire at the Battle of al-Qādisiyyah amounted to 120,000 troops at most (citing the 8th-century historian Sayf ibn Umar). The Muqaddimah states that if the Israelites really did have such a large army, the extent of their empire would have been far larger, as "the size of administrative units and provinces under a particular dynasty is in direct proportion to the size of its militia and the groups that support the dynasty".

The Muqaddimah further notes that Moses lived only a few generations after Jacob, the founder of the Israelite tribes, according to the Levite tribe genealogy, as described by Al-Masudi. Ibn Khaldun argues that it "is improbable that the descendants of one man could branch out into such a number within four generations". He states that Jews have claimed the unrealistically large increase in the Israelite population within several generations was possible because it was a miracle of God, a claim that Ibn Khaldun did not dismiss completely. He considers such a miracle highly unlikely, but appears to be open to the possibility.

== Islamic theology ==
The Muqaddimah contains discussions on Islamic theology which show that Ibn Khaldun was a follower of the orthodox Ash'ari school of Sunni Islamic thought and a supporter of al-Ghazali's religious views. He was also a critic of Neoplatonism, particularly its notion of a hierarchy of being.

The Muqaddimah covers the historical development of kalam and the different schools of Islamic thought, notably the Mu'tazili and Ash'ari schools. Ibn Khaldun, being a follower of the Ash'ari school, criticizes the views of the Mu'tazili school, and bases his criticisms on the views of Abu al-Hasan al-Ash'ari, whom he describes as "the mediator between different approaches in the kalam". Ibn Khaldun also covers the historical development of Islamic logic in the context of theology, as he viewed logic as being distinct from early Islamic philosophy, and believed that philosophy should remain separate from theology. The book also contains commentaries on verses from the Qur'an.

=== Islamic psychology ===
In Islamic psychology, Ibn Khaldun wrote the following on dream interpretation:

Often, we may deduce (the existence of) that high spiritual world and the essences it contains, from visions and things we had not been aware of while awake but which we find in our sleep and which are brought to our attention in it and which, if they are true (dreams), conform with actuality. We thus know that they are true and come from the world of truth. "Confused dreams", on the other hand, are pictures of the imagination that are stored inside by perception and to which the ability to think is applied, after (man) has retired from sense perception.

=== Science of hadith ===
Ibn Khaldun discussed the science of hadith. He disagreed with the use of reason in the evaluation of a hadith, arguing that "there is no place for the intellect in them, save that the intellect may be used in connection with them to relate problems of detail with basic principles."

On the authority of the Sahih al-Bukhari, the Muqaddimah also argues that, despite the Islamic belief that the Torah was altered by the Jews, the Muslims should neither believe nor disbelieve historical claims concerning the Torah made by Jews and Christians, particularly in regards to miraculous events. He states that:

the statement concerning the alteration (of the Torah by the Jews) is unacceptable to thorough scholars and cannot be understood in its plain meaning, since custom prevents people who have a (revealed) religion from dealing with their divine scriptures in such a manner. This was mentioned by al-Bukhari in the Sahih.

Rosenthal however comments on this, saying he is unsure exactly which tradition Ibn Khaldun is referring to, noting that al-Bukhari certainly believed in the alteration of the Torah by the Jews, suggesting that Ibn Khaldun was perhaps referring to the oft-quoted tradition that Muslims should neither believe nor disbelieve such statements of the Jews and Christians.

=== Sharia and fiqh ===
Ibn Khaldun was an Islamic jurist and discussed the topics of sharia (Islamic law) and fiqh (Islamic jurisprudence) in his Muqaddimah. Ibn Khaldun wrote that "Jurisprudence is the knowledge of the classification of the laws of God." In regards to jurisprudence, he acknowledged the inevitability of change in all aspects of a community, and wrote:

The conditions, customs and beliefs of peoples and nations do not indefinitely follow the same pattern and adhere to a constant course. There is rather, change with days and epochs, as well as passing from one state to another ... such is the law of God that has taken place with regard to His subjects.

Ibn Khaldun further described Fiqh jurisprudence as "knowledge of the rules of God which concern the actions of persons who own themselves bound to obey the law respecting what is required (wajib), forbidden (haraam), recommended (mandūb), disapproved (makruh) or merely permitted (mubah)".

== Natural sciences ==
=== Biology ===
Some of Ibn Khaldun's thoughts, according to some commentators, anticipate the biological theory of evolution. Ibn Khaldun asserted that humans developed from "the world of the monkeys", in a process by which "species become more numerous" in Chapter 1 of the Muqaddimah:

One should then take a look at the world of creation. It started out from the minerals and progressed, in an ingenious, gradual manner, to plants and animals. The last stage of minerals is connected with the first stage of plants, such as herbs and seedless plants. The last stage of plants, such as palms and vines, is connected with the first stage of animals, such as snails and shellfish which have only the power of touch. The word 'connection' with regard to these created things means that the last stage of each group is fully prepared to become the first stage of the newest group. The animal world then widens, its species become numerous, and, in a gradual process of creation, it finally leads to man, who is able to think and reflect. The higher stage of man is reached from the world of monkeys, in which both sagacity and perception are found, but which has not reached the stage of actual reflection and thinking. At this point we come to the first stage of man. This is as far as our (physical) observation extends.

Ibn Khaldun believed that humans are the most evolved form of animals, in that they have the ability to reason. The Muqaddimah also states in Chapter 6:

We explained there that the whole of existence in (all) its simple and composite worlds is arranged in a natural order of ascent and descent, so that everything constitutes an uninterrupted continuum. The essences at the end of each particular stage of the worlds are by nature prepared to be transformed into the essence adjacent to them, either above or below them. This is the case with the simple material elements; it is the case with palms and vines, (which constitute) the last stage of plants, in their relation to snails and shellfish, (which constitute) the (lowest) stage of animals. It is also the case with monkeys, creatures combining in themselves cleverness and perception, in their relation to man, the being who has the ability to think and to reflect. The preparedness (for transformation) that exists on either side, at each stage of the worlds, is meant when (we speak about) their connection.

Plants do not have the same fineness and power that animals have. Therefore, the sages rarely turned to them. Animals are the last and final stage of the three permutations. Minerals turn into plants, and plants into animals, but animals cannot turn into anything finer than themselves.

His evolutionary ideas appear to be similar to those found in the Encyclopedia of the Brethren of Purity. Ibn Khaldun was also an adherent of environmental determinism. He believed that the black skin, practices, and customs of the people of sub-Saharan Africa were due to the region's hot climate, a theory that according to Rosenthal may have been influenced by the Greek geographical ideas expounded by Ptolemy's Tetrabiblos. Ibn Khaldun viewed the Hamitic theory, where the sons of Ham became black as the result of a curse from God, as a myth.

Shoaib Ahmed Malik has argued that Ibn Khaldun's theory, while remarkable for its acceptance of the kinship between monkeys and humans, should be understood in the context of the late antique and medieval concept of the great chain of being. This theory postulates a linked hierarchy between all entities in creation but is not properly a theory of evolution. The system of the great chain of being implies a graded similarity between the various stages in the hierarchy from minerals to plants, animals, humans, angels, and God, but not a temporal process in which one species originates from the other. While according to some mystical interpretations individual souls may move up the 'ladder' in order to reunite with the divine, the species (or 'substantial forms', in the language of Aristotelian and Neoplatonic ontology) themselves are eternal and fixed. Malik states that quotes from the Muqadimmah like the first one cite above are often given without proper regard for their context. The quote is taken from a section called The Real Meaning of Prophecy, which argues that prophets occupy a place in the great chain of being just beneath angels. In Ibn Khaldun's view, this explains why individual prophets may temporarily ascend to the rank of angels and share with them in the knowledge of the divine, which they may then bring back to humanity in the form of revelation. According to Malik, interpretations that see in this an early form of scientific evolution theory ought to explain how angels, prophets and the upwards ascent of the soul fit into that theory.

=== Alchemy ===
Ibn Khaldun was a critic of the practice of alchemy. The Muqaddimah discusses the history of alchemy, the views of alchemists such as Jabir ibn Hayyan, and the theories of the transmutation of metals and elixir of life. One chapter of the book contains a systematic refutation of alchemy on social, scientific, philosophical and religious grounds.

He begins his refutation on social grounds, arguing that many alchemists are incapable of earning a living and end up "losing their credibility because of the futility of their attempts", and states that if transmutation were possible, the disproportionate growth of gold and silver "would make transactions useless and would run counter to divine wisdom". He argues that some alchemists resort to fraud, either openly by applying a thin layer of gold on top of silver jewelry, or by secretly using an artificial procedure of covering whitened copper with sublimated mercury.

Ibn Khaldun states that most alchemists are honest and believe that the transmutation of metals is possible, but he argues that transmutation is an implausible theory since there has been no successful attempt to date. He ends his arguments with a restatement of his position: "Alchemy can only be achieved through psychic influences (bi-ta'thirat al-nufus). Extraordinary things are either miracles or witchcraft ... They are unbounded; nobody can claim to acquire them."

== Political theory ==
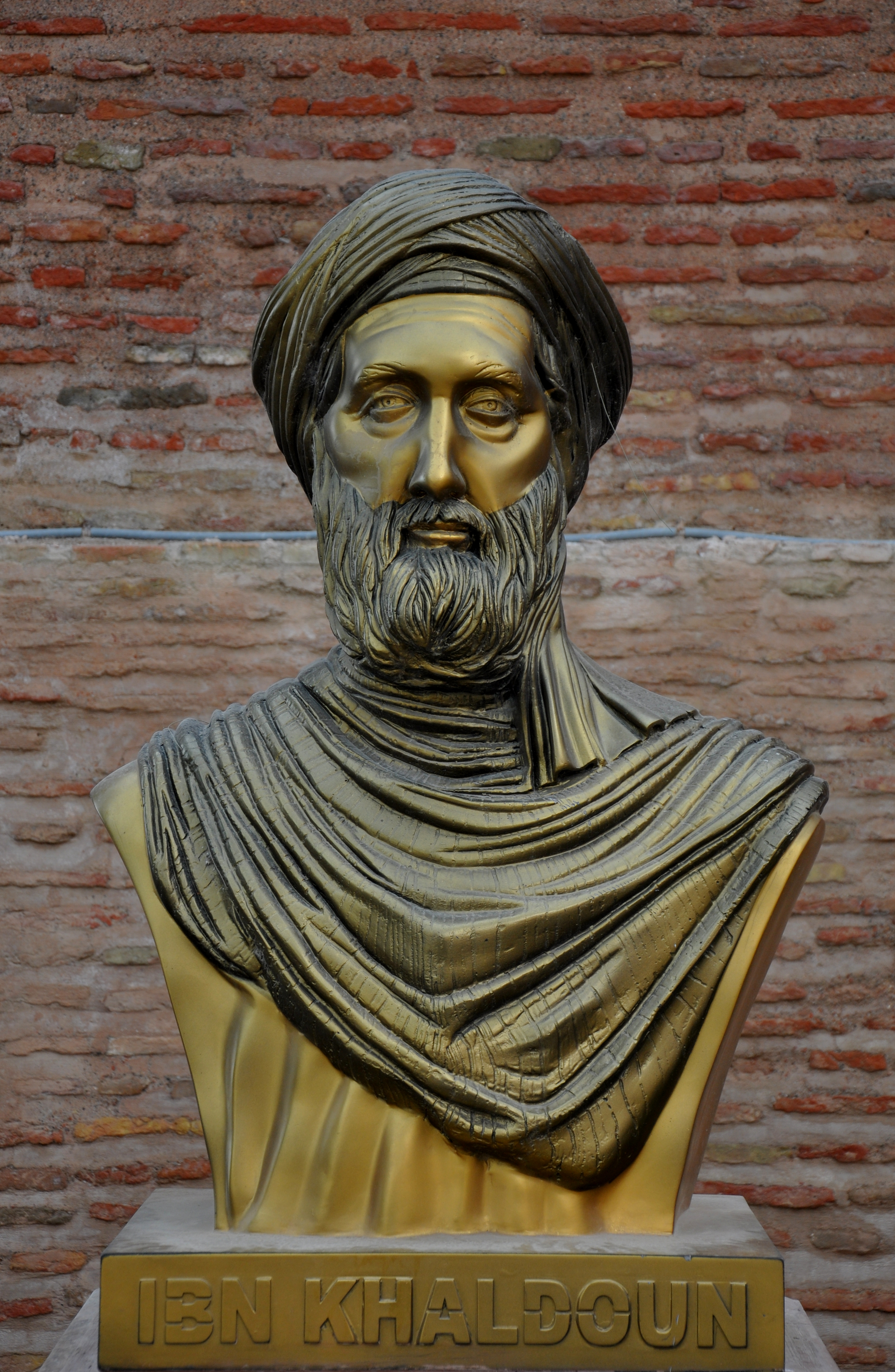
Bust of Ibn Khaldoun in the entrance of the Kasbah of Bejaia, Algeria

In the Muqaddimah's introductory remarks, Ibn Khaldun agrees with the classical republicanism of the Aristotelian proposition that man is political by nature, and that man's interdependence creates the need for the political community. Yet he argues that men and tribes need to defend themselves from potential attacks, and thus political communities are formed. The glue which holds such tribes together and eventually forms "royal authority" or the state, according to Ibn Khaldun, is ʿasabiyyah. He argues that the best type of political community is a caliphate or Islamic state, and argues that the neo-Platonist political theories of al-Farabi and Ibn Sina and the "perfect state" (Madinatu l-Faḍīlah) are useless because God's Law, the sharia, has been revealed to take account of public interest and the afterlife. The second most perfect state, Ibn Khaldun argues, is one based on justice and consideration for public welfare in this life, but not based on religious law and so not beneficial to one's afterlife. Ibn Khaldun calls this state blameworthy. Yet the worst type of state, according to Ibn Khaldun, is a tyranny wherein government usurps property rights and rules with injustice against the rights of men. He argues that if that is not possible for a ruler to be both loved and feared, then it is better to be loved, because fear creates many negative effects in the state's population.

Ibn Khaldun writes that civilizations have lifespans like individuals, and that every state will eventually fall because sedentary luxuries distract them, and eventually government begins to overtax citizens and begin injustice against property rights, and "injustice ruins civilization". Eventually after one dynasty or royal authority falls, it is replaced by another, in a continuous cycle.

The British philosopher-anthropologist Ernest Gellner considered Ibn Khaldun's definition of government, "an institution which prevents injustice other than such as it commits itself", the best in the history of political philosophy.

== Assessment of various civilizations ==
While discussing his "new science", now associated with the social sciences, Ibn Khaldūn states that no other author before him, as far as he was aware, had written about it. However, he was aware that much knowledge of the past had been lost, and thus he was open to the possibility that someone might have anticipated him but that their work had not survived:

Perhaps they have written exhaustively on this topic, and their work did not reach us. There are many sciences. There have been numerous sages among the nations of mankind. The knowledge that has not come down to us is larger than the knowledge that has. Where are the sciences of the Persians that ‘Umar ordered to be wiped out at the time of the conquest? Where are the sciences of the Chaladaeans, the Syrians and the Babylonians, and the scholarly products and results that were theirs? Where are the sciences of the Copts, their predecessors? The sciences of only one nation, the Greeks, have come down to us, because they were translated through Al-Ma'mun's efforts. He was successful in this direction because he had many translators at his disposal and spent much money in this connection.

Ibn Khaldūn characterized Aristotle as "the First Teacher", for his having "improved the methods of logic and systematized its problems and details".

=== Nomadic and sedentary societies ===
Ibn Khaldun's sociological framework in the Muqaddimah contrasts nomadic life (badāwa) with sedentary life (ḥaḍāra). Within this specific context, he frequently utilizes the term ʿArab to designate nomadic pastoralists and desert dwellers. He attributes specific socio-political behaviors to these nomadic groups, asserting that their reliance on mobility and open plains shapes their approach to warfare and conquest.

Regarding the expansion of nomadic tribes, he wrote:

Arabs can gain control only over flat territory. This is because, on account of their savage nature [desert attitude], they are people who pillage and cause damage. They plunder whatever they are able to take without fighting or taking risks, and then flee to their refuge in the wilderness... Therefore, tribes that are defended against them by hills are safe from their destructiveness and depredations.

On the Arab conquests of the 7th century:

Religious propaganda gives a dynasty at its beginning another power in addition to that of the group feeling it possessed as the result of the number of its supporters ... This happened to the Arabs at the beginning of Islam during the Muslim conquests. The armies of the Muslims at al-Qadisiyah and at the Yarmuk numbered some 30,000 in each case, while the Persian troops at al-Qadisiyah numbered 120,000, and the troops of Heraclius, according to al-Waqidi, 400,000. Neither of the two parties was able to withstand the Arabs, who routed them and seized what they possessed.

Ibn Khaldun devotes a substantial number of pages to the conquests of North Africa and the conflicts between the region's Berber inhabitants and the new Arab arrivals. According to the scholar Abdelmajid Hannoum, Ibn Khaldun's descriptions of the distinctions between Berbers and Arabs were meant to refer only to specific eras, and were misinterpreted by the translator William McGuckin de Slane as a more general "racial ideology that sets Arabs and Berbers apart and in opposition".

=== Contributions to Islamic sciences ===
Classical Islamic scholars maintained a strict linguistic and sociological distinction between the ethnic designation of Arabs (ʿArab) and the lifestyle designation of Bedouins (Aʿrāb). The theologian and exegete Fakhr al-Din al-Razi, in his commentary Mafatih al-Ghayb regarding Quran 9:97, specifies that the term Aʿrāb strictly denotes desert-dwelling nomads of any origin. The term ʿArab encompasses both nomadic and fully sedentary urban populations. Early linguists utilized these classifications to differentiate between urbanized centers and nomadic environments.

Within the Muqaddimah, Ibn Khaldun dedicates a chapter to the observation that the majority of early scholars in Islamic disciplines, such as grammar, jurisprudence, and exegesis were ʿAjam (non-Arabs). His analysis contextualizes this phenomenon within a sociological division of labor. During the initial centuries of the Islamic conquests, the Arab populace was predominantly engaged in military campaigns, statecraft, and governance. Ibn Khaldun categorizes the pursuit of scientific and scholarly disciplines as urban crafts (ṣanāʾiʿ). The cultivation of these crafts requires extended periods of sedentary stability, a condition readily available to the urbanized populations of the incorporated territories. Although Ibn Khaldun's classification in this passage was not based exclusively on genealogy. He explicitly states that even when a scholar was Arab by lineage, he could nevertheless be considered non-Arab in his language, upbringing, and teachers. Modern scholar Hany Rashwan consequently interprets Ibn Khaldun's discussion in terms of mother language, upbringing, and educational influences, rather than treating it simply as a classification of ethnic descent.

The term ʿAjam in classical Arabic literature broadly encompasses all populations whose native language is outside the Arabic linguistic sphere.This category includes Persians, Syriacs, Copts, Berbers, Turks and Romans etc. . The integration of these diverse sedentary societies into the broader Islamic state facilitated their extensive participation in the codification and expansion of the intellectual sciences.

Modern historians have challenged Ibn Khaldun's demographic classification of scholars in the Islamic East, arguing that his framework frequently conflates geographic residence in sedentary centers with non-Arab lineage. Following the early Muslim conquests, extensive migrations of Arab tribes, such as Tamim, Azd, and Rabi'ah occurred throughout Khorasan and Transoxiana. These tribes settled in metropolitan centers, and actively participated in the intellectual milieu of these regions. Consequently, numerous scholars bearing geographic nisbas (attributions) linking them to Persian or Central Asian cities were of direct Arab tribal descent.

While acknowledging the major Persian contribution to Islamic intellectual life, Sayılı argued that Ibn Khaldun was "not entirely fair to the Arabs" and that his categorical assessment was exaggerated. He cited Hunayn ibn Ishaq and Al-Kindi as counterexamples, and favored Vasily Bartold's emphasis on cooperation between peoples of different regions in the development of Islamic civilization.

Ibn Khaldun's generalization has also been questioned with regard to the origins of Islamic legal theory. Al-Shafi'i, who belonged to the Qurayshi clan of Banu Muttalib, occupies a foundational position in the discipline. Ahmed El Shamsy describes the emergence of systematic Islamic legal science as having been inaugurated by al-Shafi'i's innovative legal theory, while Joseph E. Lowry identifies al-Shafi'i's Risala as the earliest preserved work of Islamic legal theory. This provides a notable Arab counterexample to Ibn Khaldun's categorical statement concerning the scholars of usul al-fiqh.

In his extensive genealogical study, Iraqi historian Naji Ma'ruf critiques the methodology underlying Ibn Khaldun's assertions regarding the "Ajam" monopoly on the intellectual sciences. Ma'ruf provides demographic evidence demonstrating that many scholars categorized as non-Arabs based on their geographic origins were ethnically Arab. He cites the grammarian Abu Ali al-Farisi as an example; Ibn Khaldun groups him among Persian scholars due to his association with Fars Province, whereas Ma'ruf traces his lineage directly to the Arab Banu Lakhm dynasty. Furthermore, Ma'ruf highlights structural omissions in Ibn Khaldun's account of the foundational linguistic sciences. Although the Muqaddimah credits the Persian scholar Sibawayh with establishing Arabic grammar, it bypasses his mentor, Al-Khalil ibn Ahmad al-Farahidi—an Arab from the Azd tribe recognized as the primary architect of Arabic philology and prosody. Based on this genealogical tracking, Ma'ruf concludes that the perceived dominance of "Ajam" scholars described by Ibn Khaldun partially stems from a historiographical failure to account for the massive Arab diaspora and settlement in the eastern provinces.

Ibn Khaldun further observed that the demographic and geographic centers of scientific inquiry shifted over time due to geopolitical changes. He noted that the devastation of urban centers in the eastern Islamic world led to a decline in their sedentary culture (ḥaḍāra) and, consequently, their scientific output. The intellectual center of gravity subsequently moved to Mamluk Egypt, which had successfully preserved its urban stability and institutional infrastructure:

This situation continued in the cities as long as the non-Arabs [ʿAjam] and their countries—Persian Iraq, Khorasan, and Transoxania—retained their sedentary culture. But when those cities fell into ruins, sedentary culture, which God has devised for the attainment of sciences and crafts, disappeared from them. Along with it, scholarship altogether disappeared from among the non-Arabs, who were engulfed by the desert attitude. Scholarship was restricted to cities with an abundant sedentary culture. Today, no city has a more abundant sedentary culture than Cairo (Egypt). It is the mother of the world, the great center of Islam, and the mainspring of the sciences and the crafts.

In his analysis of the transmission of knowledge, Ibn Khaldun describes the process by which early Muslims assimilated and expanded upon the intellectual heritage of preceding civilizations:

(The Muslims) desired to learn the sciences of the (foreign) nations. They made them their own through translations. They pressed them into the mold of their own views. They took them over into their own language from the non-Arab languages and surpassed the achievements of (the non-Arabs) in them.

Regarding the origins of ancient sciences, Ibn Khaldun records a circulating historical narrative alleging that Greek intellectual disciplines were acquired through the confiscation of Persian repositories. He frames this transmission as a traditional account linked to the Macedonian conquests:

Among the Persians, the intellectual sciences played a large and important role, since the Persian dynasties were powerful and ruled without interruption. The intellectual sciences are said to have come to the Greeks from the Persians, (at the time) when Alexander killed Darius and gained control of the Achaemenid empire. At that time, he appropriated the books and sciences of the Persians.

Modern historiography contextualizes Ibn Khaldun's account of Alexander appropriating Persian intellectual sciences as a reproduction of a Late Antique political ideology. Historians of science, notably Dimitri Gutas, trace this specific narrative directly to the Sasanian Empire. According to Gutas, the Sasanian administration faced a practical need to integrate foreign Greek and Indian scientific texts. To justify this appropriation, Sasanian rulers promoted a state ideology asserting that all worldly knowledge originated from the original Avesta. They propagated the claim that Alexander the Great had destroyed the Persian empire and confiscated its scientific corpus, thereby framing the Sasanian translation movement as a legitimate recovery of stolen Zoroastrian wisdom.

This Sasanian historiography entered classical Islamic literature primarily through the works of early astrologers, such as Abu Ma'shar al-Balkhi, whose historical narratives were subsequently cited by later Muslim historians, including Ibn Khaldun. Furthermore, historians and archaeologists indicate that pre-Sasanian Achaemenid and Parthian societies were predominantly oral cultures regarding intellectual and religious traditions, lacking the extensive textual repositories of theoretical sciences described in these medieval accounts.

=== Berber societies and the Maghreb ===
Ibn Khaldun dedicated a substantial portion of his historiography to the Berbers, categorizing them as one of the major demographic groups of the world. Applying his sociological framework to North Africa (the Maghreb), he identified the Berber populations as deeply rooted in the nomadic lifestyle (badāwa). He attributed their significant historical and political influence to their intense tribal solidarity (ʿaṣabiyyah), which was forged by the harsh geographic realities of the mountains and deserts they inhabited.

When evaluating the socio-economic development of the Maghreb, Ibn Khaldun observed a historical deficit in established sedentary culture (ḥaḍāra), specialized crafts, and theoretical sciences prior to the Islamic era. He theorized that continuous urbanization and the accumulation of crafts require prolonged dynastic stability. The Maghreb, dominated by recurrent nomadic cycles, lacked the uninterrupted state structures necessary to foster deep-rooted urban traditions. Modern historians, such as Abdallah Laroui, emphasize that Ibn Khaldun framed the history of the Maghreb as a structural tension between the nomadic Berber hinterland and urban settlements. According to this Khaldunian paradigm, the consolidation of complex urban crafts, architectural traditions, and institutional sciences in North Africa was largely catalyzed by external integration, specifically the Arab-Islamic conquests and the subsequent influx of Andalusian refugees, who transferred established sedentary traditions to the region.

=== Jewish civilization ===
In his comparative analysis of religious and political authority, Ibn Khaldun contrasts the Islamic Caliphate—which integrates religious and royal authority to pursue a universal mission—with the structural foundations of other religions. He observes that Judaism lacks a religious obligation to wage universal holy war for expansion, requiring its followers exclusively to establish and maintain their religion within their own demographic group.

Sociologically, Ibn Khaldun utilizes this distinction to explain why the Israelites initially did not seek royal authority (a centralized state) following the era of Moses and Joshua. Their primary focus remained on religious observance rather than imperial dominion. According to his analysis, royal authority was established only when external political and military pressures necessitated it, leading to the united monarchy of Saul, David, and Solomon, and the subsequent division into the kingdoms of Judah and Israel.

=== Sub-Saharan Africa ===
Ibn Khaldun's sociological descriptions of Sub-Saharan Africa rely extensively on Ptolemaic geographic models and the theory of climatic determinism. Within this analytical framework, he posited that populations inhabiting extreme climatic zones—such as the intense heat of the First Zone (the deep south) or the extreme cold of the Seventh Zone (the deep north)—exhibit physical and behavioral traits diverging from temperate human norms, often comparing their societal structures to those of animals.

Regarding West Africa, Ibn Khaldun records that the Ghana Empire was historically the most powerful state in the Western Sahel following the early Muslim conquests. He observes that the empire was eventually weakened and absorbed by neighboring groups, specifically attributing Ghana's ultimate collapse to an invasion by the Almoravid dynasty, which he claims compelled the population to convert to Islam. Modern historiography, however, heavily critiques this traditional account. Scholars emphasize that the purported Almoravid military conquest of Ghana in 1076 lacks archaeological evidence, suggesting instead that Ghana's decline resulted from a combination of internal political fragmentation, shifting trade routes, and gradual Almoravid influence.

When detailing the regions extending south of the Sahel, Ibn Khaldun employs harsh terminology derived directly from his climatic theories to describe populations residing outside the temperate zones:

To the south of this... there is a Negro people called Lamlam. They are unbelievers. They brand themselves on the face and temples. The people of Ghanah and Takrur invade their country, capture them, and sell them to merchants who transport them to the Maghrib. There, they constitute the ordinary mass of slaves. Beyond them to the south, there is no civilization in the proper sense. There are only humans who are closer to dumb animals than to rational beings. They live in thickets and caves and eat herbs and unprepared grain. They frequently eat each other. They cannot be considered human beings.

In discussing the slave trade, he applied this same geographic determinism to explain the enslavement of populations from the deep south, stating: "Therefore, the Negro nations are, as a rule, submissive to slavery, because (Negroes) have little that is (essentially) human and possess attributes that are quite similar to those of dumb animals, as we have stated."

Conversely, Ibn Khaldun provided detailed geographic and economic descriptions of established states in East Africa, such as Nubia. He accurately noted the location of Dongola relative to the Nile River and documented the logistical impact of the Nile cataracts on regional commerce, detailing how trade goods had to be offloaded from vessels and transported overland by pack animals to Aswan.
