= Treatise on Logic =

Works entitled Treatise on Logic may refer to the following:

- Treatise on Logic Philosophical work by Maimonides, written in his early years. Originally composed in Arabic (Maqala Fi-Sinat Al-Mantiq), it was translated into Hebrew (מילות הגיון) by Moses ibn Tibbon.
- Lubābu l-Muhassal, a work by Ibn Khaldūn, which was published in English as Treatise on Logic;
- A Treatise on Logic, a Nineteenth Century work by Francis Bowen;
- Sharh-i Manzumah (A Treatise on Logic in Verse), a book by Hadi Sabzavari;
- Summa Totius Logicae (Treatise on all Logic), a book by philosopher William of Ockham;
- Tractatus Minor Logicae (Lesser Treatise on Logic), a work attributed to William of Ockham.
