= Qalʿat ibn Salama =

Ancient fortress in Algeria

Qalʿat ibn Salama (Arabic: قلعة ابن سلامة) is an ancient fortress and archeological site near Tiaret, Algeria. This place is known for having sheltered Ibn Khaldun, an Arab scholar and historian, for four years, between 1375 and 1379. It was here at Qalʿat ibn Salama that he wrote his Muqaddimah (known as Prolegomenon in Greek).

This fortress is situated on a mountain top nearby Taoughzout at about three miles south of Frenda in the wilaya of Tiaret.

== Climate ==
The fortress is in a region with a hot desert climate (Köppen climate classification BWh), with very hot summers and mild winters. Rainfall is light and sporadic, and summers are particularly dry.
