= Ibn Khaldun =

Arab Islamic scholar, historian and philosopher (1332–1406)

Ibn Khaldun ابن خلدون
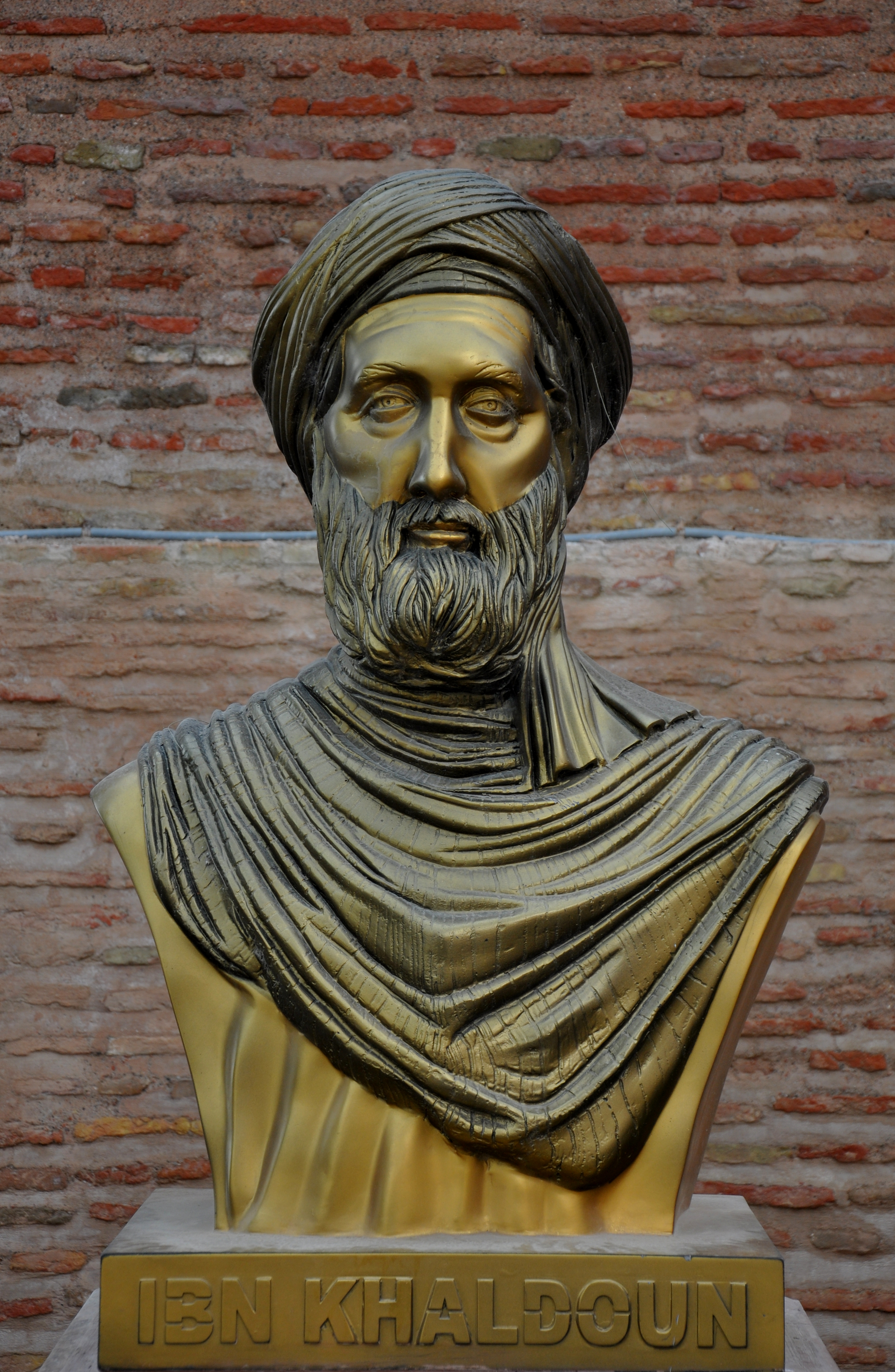
- Bust of Ibn Khaldun in the entrance of the Kasbah of Bejaia, Algeria

Personal life
- Born: 27 May 1332 Tunis, Hafsid Sultanate
- Died: 17 March 1406 (aged 73) Cairo, Mamluk Sultanate
- Main interests: Historiography; sociology; economics; demography; political science
- Notable ideas: Asabiyyah; Conquest theory of state formation; Cyclical theory of empires; Economic growth theory; Supply and demand theory; Supply-side economics
- Relatives: Yahya ibn Khaldun

Religious life
- Religion: Islam
- Denomination: Sunni
- Jurisprudence: Maliki
- Creed: Ash'ari

Muslim leader
- Influenced by: Al-Farabi; Al-Ghazali; Al-Jahiz; Al-Razi; Al-Tusi; Aristotle; At-Turtushi; Ibn Bajja; Ibn Rushd; Ibn Sina; Ibn Abi Zar; Ibn Hazm; Ibn Jarir; Al-Mawardi; Al-Tilmisani
- Influenced: Ibn al-Khatib; Ibn al-Sakkak; Al-Maqrizi; Ibn Ghurab; Ibn al-Azraq; Çelebi; Mustafa Naima; Ahmed Cevdet; 20th-century traditionalism; Toynbee; Orowan; Amel; Comte
- Arabic name
- Personal (Ism): ʿAbd al-Raḥmān عَبْدُ الرَّحْمَٰنِ
- Patronymic (Nasab): ibn Muḥammad ibn Muḥammad ibn Abī Bakr Muḥammad ibn al-Ḥasan ibn Khaldūn بن مُحَمَّد بن مُحَمَّد بن أَبِي بَكْر مُحَمَّد بن الحَسَن بن خَلْدُون
- Teknonymic (Kunya): Abū Zayd أَبُو زَيْدٍ
- Epithet (Laqab): Walī al-Dīn وَلِيُّ الدِّيْنِ
- Toponymic (Nisba): al-Ḥaḍramī al-Tūnisī al-Maghribī al-Ishbīlī al-Mālikī الْحَضْرَمِيُّ التُونِسِيُّ المَغْرِبِيُّ الإِشْبِيلِيُّ المَالِكِيُّ

Ibn Khaldūn (Note: /ˈɪbən hælˈduːn/ IB-ən hal-DOON; Arabic: ابن خلدون [ibn xalduːn]; Full name: Abū Zayd ʿAbd al-Raḥmān ibn Muḥammad ibn Khaldūn al-Ḥaḍramī (Arabic: أبو زيد عبد الرحمن بن محمد بن خلدون الحضرمي) He is also attributed the nisbas al-Tūnisī and al-Maghribī due to his birth and long residence in North Africa.) (27 May 1332 – 17 March 1406, 732–808 AH) was an Arab Tunisian scholar, historian, philosopher, and sociologist. He is widely acknowledged to be one of the greatest social scientists of the Middle Ages, and is considered by a number of scholars to be a major forerunner of historiography, sociology, economics, and demography studies. (Note: "...regarded by some Westerners as the true father of historiography and sociology".; "Ibn Khaldun has been claimed the forerunner of a great number of European thinkers, mostly sociologists, historians, and philosophers".(Boulakia 1971); "The founding father of Eastern Sociology".; "This grand scheme to find a new science of society makes him the forerunner of many of the eighteenth and nineteenth centuries system-builders such as Vico, Comte and Marx." "As one of the early founders of the social sciences...".) (Note: "He is considered by some as a father of modern economics, or at least a major forerunner. The Western world recognizes Khaldun as the father of sociology but hesitates in recognizing him as a great economist who laid its very foundations. He was the first to systematically analyze the functioning of an economy, the importance of technology, specialization and foreign trade in economic surplus and the role of government and its stabilization policies to increase output and employment. Moreover, he dealt with the problem of optimum taxation, minimum government services, incentives, institutional framework, law and order, expectations, production, and the theory of value".Cosma, Sorinel (2009). "Ibn Khaldun's Economic Thinking". Ovidius University Annals of Economics (Ovidius University Press) XIV:52–57)

His best-known book is the Muqaddimah or Prolegomena ("Introduction"), which he wrote in six months as he states in his autobiography. It later influenced 17th-century and 19th-century Ottoman historians such as Kâtip Çelebi, Mustafa Naima and Ahmed Cevdet Pasha, who used its theories to analyze the growth and decline of the Ottoman Empire. Ibn Khaldun interacted with Tamerlane, the founder of the Timurid Empire.

He has been called one of the most prominent Muslim and Arab scholars and historians. Recently, Ibn Khaldun's works have been compared with those of influential European philosophers such as Niccolò Machiavelli, Giambattista Vico, David Hume, G. W. F. Hegel, Karl Marx, and Auguste Comte as well as the economists David Ricardo and Adam Smith, suggesting that their ideas found precedent (although not direct influence) in his. He has also been influential on certain modern Islamic thinkers (e.g. those of the traditionalist school).

== Early life ==
Ibn Khaldun's life is well-documented as a result of his biography. However, despite it being described by the historian Allen Fromherz as "the most detailed autobiography in Medieval Muslim literature", it lacked many personal details.

Both the scholars Walter Joseph Fischel and Syed Farid Alatas divided Ibn Khaldun's life into phases with the former dividing it into two and the latter into three. Fischel divides his life into the period he lived in the Maghreb (birth to fifty years) and the period he lived in Egypt. Alatas divides it into the first twenty years covering his education, the next twenty years in political office and the final twenty where he served as a scholar, teacher and magistrate.

=== Birth and family ===
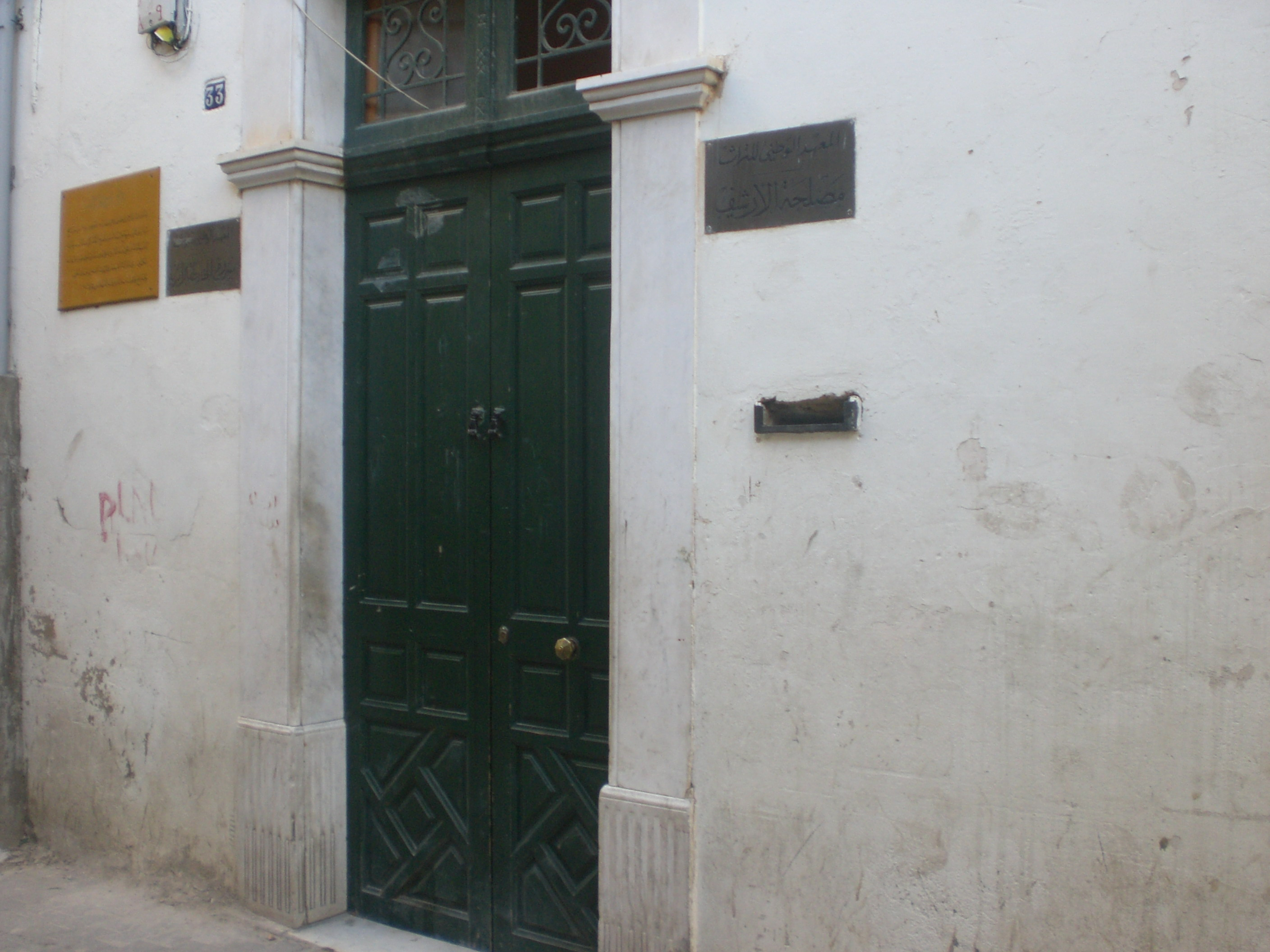
Birth home of Ibn Khaldun at Tunis The Khaldūniyyah quarter in Tunis where he was born remains unchanged.

ʿAbd al-Raḥmān ibn Khaldūn was born in Tunis on 26 May 1332 (1 Ramadan 732 AH) into an upper-class Andalusian family of Yemeni Arab descent, the Banū Khaldūn. He traced his family's ancestry to Ḥaḍramawt with his lineage specifically going back to Wāʾil ibn Ḥujr a companion of the Islamic prophet Muhammad and a prominent chief: (Note: According to Ibn Khaldun's biography, from the ancestor Khaldūn, the lineage goes Khaldūn ibn ‘Uthmān ibn Hānīʾ ibn al-Khaṭṭāb ibn Kurayb ibn Maʿdīkarib ibn al-Hārith ibn Wāʾil ibn Hujr.)

Our ancestry goes back to Ḥaḍramawt, [we belong to the] Arabs of the Yemen, and descend from Wāʾil ibn Ḥujr. He was one of the leaders of the Arabs, was known, and had a following.

— Riḥlat Ibn Khaldūn

In a delegation to Madina visiting the prophet, Wāʾil received a blessing from the Prophet: "O Allah, bless Wa'il and his descendants!". He narrated about seventy hadiths and was also a close companion of the Umayyad caliph Muʿāwiya. The specific tribe Ibn Khaldun traced his ancestry to was Kinda. The eponymous ancestor of the Banū Khaldūn was ʿUthmān ibn Bakr ibn Khālid, also known as Khaldūn, who originally settled in Carmona then in Seville.

During the first three centuries of Muslim rule, there is little information about the Banū Khaldūn. At the start of the Umayyad caliph ʿAbd Allāh's reign in the 9th century, the Banū Khaldūn alongside the Banū l-Ḥajjāj were the leading Arab families of Seville. One of Ibn Khaldun's ancestors, Kurayb, led a revolt at that time and established a quasi-independent state in Seville. Both Ibn Ḥazm and Ibn Ḥayyān mentioned the Banū Khaldūn as one of the most important Arab families in al-Andalus occupying prominent governmental and scholarly positions in Seville. (Note: "Ibn Ḥayyān said: The house of the Banū Khaldūn continues to be renowned down to our day in Ishbīlya [Seville]. To this day, its notable [sons] continue [to excel] as high-level political officials (riʼāsa sulṭāniya) and outstanding scholars (riʼāsa ʿilmiya).") In the taifa period, the Banū Khaldūn served as viziers under the Abbadid dynasty. Under the Almohads, the Banū Khaldūn reappeared as members of the Sevillan ellite and they had ties with the Almohad governors. Ibn Khaldun was linked to the Hafsids on his maternal side as one of his maternal ancestors, Ibn al-Muhtasib, gave a Galician concubine to the Hafsid Abū Zakariyyāʾ. A descendant of this relationship was the Hafsid ruler in Tunis.

The Banū Khaldūn left Seville in 1232 before the Reconquista and the city's occupation in 1248. They first settled in the city of Ceuta before moving to Tunis. The fourth-grandfather of Ibn Khaldun, al-Ḥasan ibn Muḥammad, joined Abū Zakariyyāʾ in Bona. Ibn Khaldun's great grandfather, Abū Bakr Muḥammad ibn al-Ḥasan, served as Director of Finances (ʿamal al-ashgāl) to Abū Isḥāq. However, he died during an anti-Hafsid revolt by the pretender Ibn Abī ʿUmāra who arrested, tortured and executed Abū Bakr Muḥammad. Ibn Khaldun's grandfather, Muḥammad, was initially named Chamberlain to the Crown Prince, Abū Fāris, under Abū Isḥāq. After Abū Yaḥyā ibn al-Liḥyānī conquered Tunis, Muḥammad was appointed chamberlain. Abū Yaḥyā would often leave the affairs of state under Muḥammad's administration. Muḥammad held a number of minor positions under multiple Hafsid rulers but avoided higher appointments (potentially because of the fate of his father). After two pilgrimages to Mecca, he retired to become a religious scholar. He died in 1337. Ibn Khaldun's father, Muḥammad Abū Bakr, broke from the familial tradition and stayed out of politics. He devoted himself to fiqh, literature and piety. Ibn Khaldun had a younger brother, Yaḥyā, who was also a scholar and historian, and an older brother, Muḥammad, who there is little information about.

The Black Death (or simply the plague) was a major turning point during Ibn Khaldun's youth in which he lost close family members including both his mother and father and much of his extended family. The scholars Douglas H. Garrison and Allen Fromherz argue that the plague impacted Ibn Khaldun's worldview on public sanitation, urban life and urbanisation as well as inspiring him to write the Muqaddimah.

=== Education ===
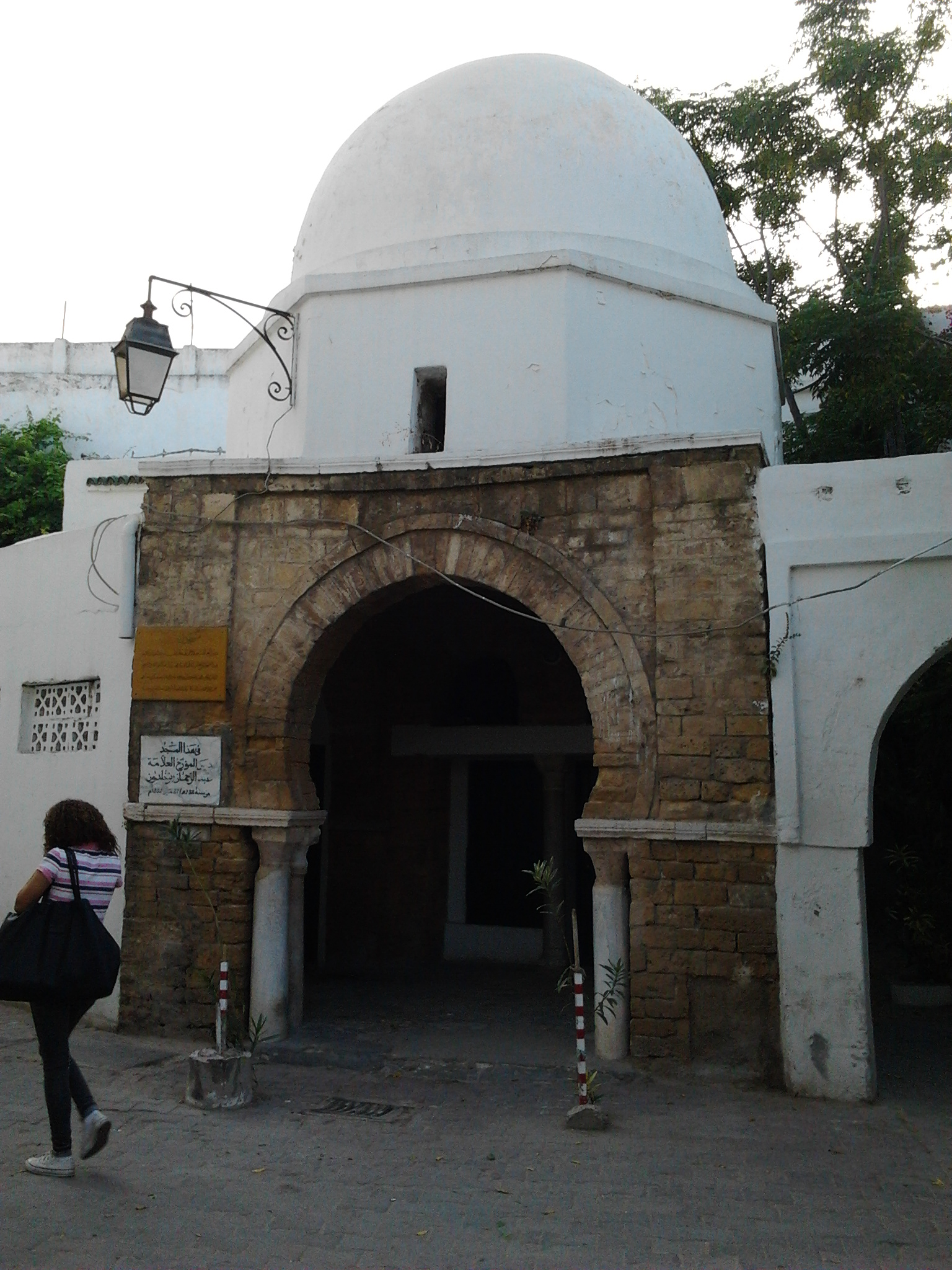
The mosque in which Ibn Khaldun studied

Ibn Khaldun's first and most influential teacher was his father. Under his father's tutelage, he studied both the Islamic and the rational sciences with his father also shaping his independent thinking and appreciation for Sufism. Coming from an erudite and socially prominent family, Ibn Khaldun studied a standard curriculum which qualified him for both scholarly and administrative professions.

He also benefitted from a number of other teachers including prominent Moroccan and Tunisian scholars along with Andalusian exiles who had settled in Tunis and other North African cities. Ibn Khaldun learnt a number of Islamic sciences including Quranic recitation and its different styles, Quranic orthography, Maliki law, the hadiths and poetry. Under his father and several grammarians and literary scholars he studied Arabic. With the Andalusian scholar Abu ʿAbdallah Muhammad al- Ansari, he studied the Quran and fiqh. At a young age, he became a hafiz. The specific style of recitation he learnt was the Yaʿqub recitation. He would also go on to memorise volumes of poetry, literature, and hadith. He received an ijāza to transmit teachings in language and law from the leading hadith scholar in Tunis, Abū ʿAbd Allāh Muḥammad ibn Jābir ibn Sulṭān al-Qaysī al-Wādīyāshī. He also received ijazas from a number of other scholars. Ibn Khaldun studied Maliki law under multiple scholars with Ibn ʿAbd Allāh al-Jayyānī teaching him the entire Kitāb al-Muwaṭṭaʾ, the basis of Maliki law.

During the Marinid occupation of Ifriqya under the ruler Abu al-Hasan, Ibn Khaldun was able to access a number of scholars from the western Maghrib. This included who would become his most prominent teacher, Muḥammad ibn Ibrāhīm al-Ābilī, described by Ibn Khaldun as "the grand master of the rational sciences". Under al-Ābilī, he studied philosophy, logic and mathematics. al-Ābilī was a rationalist and was highly influenced by Greco-Islamic thought namely that of al-Farabi, Ibn Sina, Ibn Rushd and Fakhr al-Din al-Razi. At the age of 19, under al-Ābilī, Ibn Khaldun completed an abridgement of al-Razi's Lubab al-Muhassal. Through al-Ābilī, Ibn Khaldun developed his opposition to madrasas which were typically used by the state to disseminate their own views. Not being restricted to specific institutions and having access to many teachers allowed Ibn Khaldun to have a very diverse education giving him freedom to study under any teacher who would take him.

In Tunis, both in the morning and the evening—
And the morning belongs to God as does the evening—
There is fear and hunger and death,
Stirred up by tumult and pestilence

— Quoted from a Tunisian poet describing the plague by Ibn Khaldun in the Muqaddima

The plague would kill many of his teachers. It also killed many of Abu al-Hasan's retinue and army with his remaining followers retreating back towards Fes. Eventually, al-Ābilī would also return to Fes.

== Political career ==
The plague eventually died down leaving Tunis more isolated and desolate than before. In the mid-14th century, the Hafsid ruler Abū Ishāq was nominally in charge, however, the chamberlain (ḥājib), Abū Muḥammad Ibn Tāfrāgīn, had de facto authority. Under Ibn Tāfrāgīn, Ibn Khaldun was appointed to the post of Master of the Signature/Sultan's Seal (ṣāḥib al-ʿalāma). In this post, he had the role of printing "Praise and thanks to God" between the basmala and the body of the text of official documents. He also was responsible for writing the sultan's signature at the end of official documents. However, this role also had diplomatic responsibilities and the title of ṣāḥib al-ʿalāma was used to refer to the head of chancellery. Despite ranking third in the hierarchy of officialdom, Ibn Khaldun found this career boring and unfulfilling and missed his studies under his teacher al-Ābilī.

In 1352, Abū Ziad, the sultan of Constantine, marched on Tunis and defeated it. Ibn Khaldūn, in any case unhappy with his respected but politically meaningless position, followed his teacher Abili to Fez. There, the Marinid sultan, Abū Inan Fares I, appointed him as a writer of royal proclamations, but Ibn Khaldūn still schemed against his employer, which, in 1357, got the 25-year-old a 22-month prison sentence. Upon the death of Abū Inan in 1358, Vizier al-Hasān ibn-Umar granted him freedom and reinstated him to his rank and offices. Ibn Khaldūn then schemed against Abū Inan's successor, Abū Salem Ibrahim III, with Abū Salem's exiled uncle, Abū Salem. When Abū Salem came to power, he gave Ibn Khaldūn a ministerial position, the first position to correspond with Ibn Khaldūn's ambitions.

Al-Sakhāwī summarizes his career as including travel through major western Islamic centers such as Fez, Granada, and Tlemcen, alongside repeated shifts between political roles. The same entry notes that he later arrived in Cairo in Shaʿbān 782 AH/1380 CE.

The treatment that Ibn Khaldun received after the fall of Abū Salem through Ibn-Amar ʻAbdullah, a friend of Ibn Khaldūn's, was not to his liking, as he received no significant official position. At the same time, Amar successfully prevented Ibn Khaldūn, whose political skills he knew well, from allying with the Abd al-Wadids in Tlemcen. Ibn Khaldūn, therefore, decided to move to Granada. He could be sure of a positive welcome there since at Fez, he had helped the Sultan of Granada, the Nasrid Muhammad V, regain power from his temporary exile. In 1364, Muhammad entrusted him with a diplomatic mission to the king of Castile, Pedro the Cruel, to endorse a peace treaty. Ibn Khaldūn successfully carried out this mission and politely declined Pedro's offer to remain at his court and have his family's Spanish possessions returned to him.

In Granada, Ibn Khaldūn quickly came into competition with Muhammad's vizier, Ibn al-Khatib, who viewed the close relationship between Muhammad and Ibn Khaldūn with increasing mistrust. Ibn Khaldūn tried to shape the young Muhammad into his ideal of a wise ruler, an enterprise that Ibn al-Khatib thought foolish and a danger to peace in the country. As a result of al-Khatib's influence, Ibn Khaldūn was eventually sent back to North Africa. Al-Khatib himself was later accused by Muhammad of having unorthodox philosophical views and murdered despite an attempt by Ibn Khaldūn to intercede on behalf of his old rival.

In his autobiography, Ibn Khaldūn tells little about his conflict with Ibn al-Khatib and the reasons for his departure. Twentieth century Orientalist Muhsin Mahdi interprets that as showing that Ibn Khaldūn later realised that he had completely misjudged Muhammad V.

Back in Ifriqiya, the Hafsid sultan of Béjaïa, Abū ʻAbdallāh, who had been his companion in prison, received him with great enthusiasm and made Ibn Khaldūn his prime minister. Ibn Khaldūn carried out a daring mission to collect taxes among the local Berber tribes. After the death of Abū ʻAbdallāh in 1366, Ibn Khaldūn changed sides once again and allied himself with the Sultan of Tlemcen, Abū l-Abbas. A few years later, he was taken prisoner by Abu Faris Abdul Aziz, who had defeated the sultan of Tlemcen and seized the throne. He then entered a monastic establishment and occupied himself with scholastic duties until 1370. In that year, he was sent for to Tlemcen by the new sultan. After the death of ʻAbdu l-Azīz, he resided at Fez, enjoying the patronage and confidence of the regent.

Ibn Khaldūn's political skills and, above all, his good relationship with the wild Berber tribes were in high demand among the North African rulers, but he had begun to tire of politics and constantly switching allegiances. In 1375, he was sent by Abū Hammu, the Abd al-Wadid Sultan of Tlemcen, on a mission to the Dawadida Arabs tribes of Biskra. After his return to the West, Ibn Khaldūn sought refuge with one of the Berber tribes in the west of Algeria, in the town of Qalat Ibn Salama. He lived there for over three years under their protection, taking advantage of his seclusion to write the Muqaddimah "Prolegomena", the introduction to his planned history of the world. In Ibn Salama, however, he lacked the necessary texts to complete the work. Therefore, in 1378, he returned to his native Tunis, which had meanwhile been conquered by Abū l-Abbas, who took Ibn Khaldūn back into his service. There, he devoted himself almost exclusively to his studies and completed his history of the world. His relationship with Abū l-Abbas remained strained, as the latter questioned his loyalty. That was brought into sharp contrast after Ibn Khaldūn presented him with a copy of the completed history that omitted the usual panegyric to the ruler. Under pretence of going on the Hajj to Mecca, something for which a Muslim ruler could not simply refuse permission, Ibn Khaldūn was able to leave Tunis and to sail to Alexandria.

== Later life ==
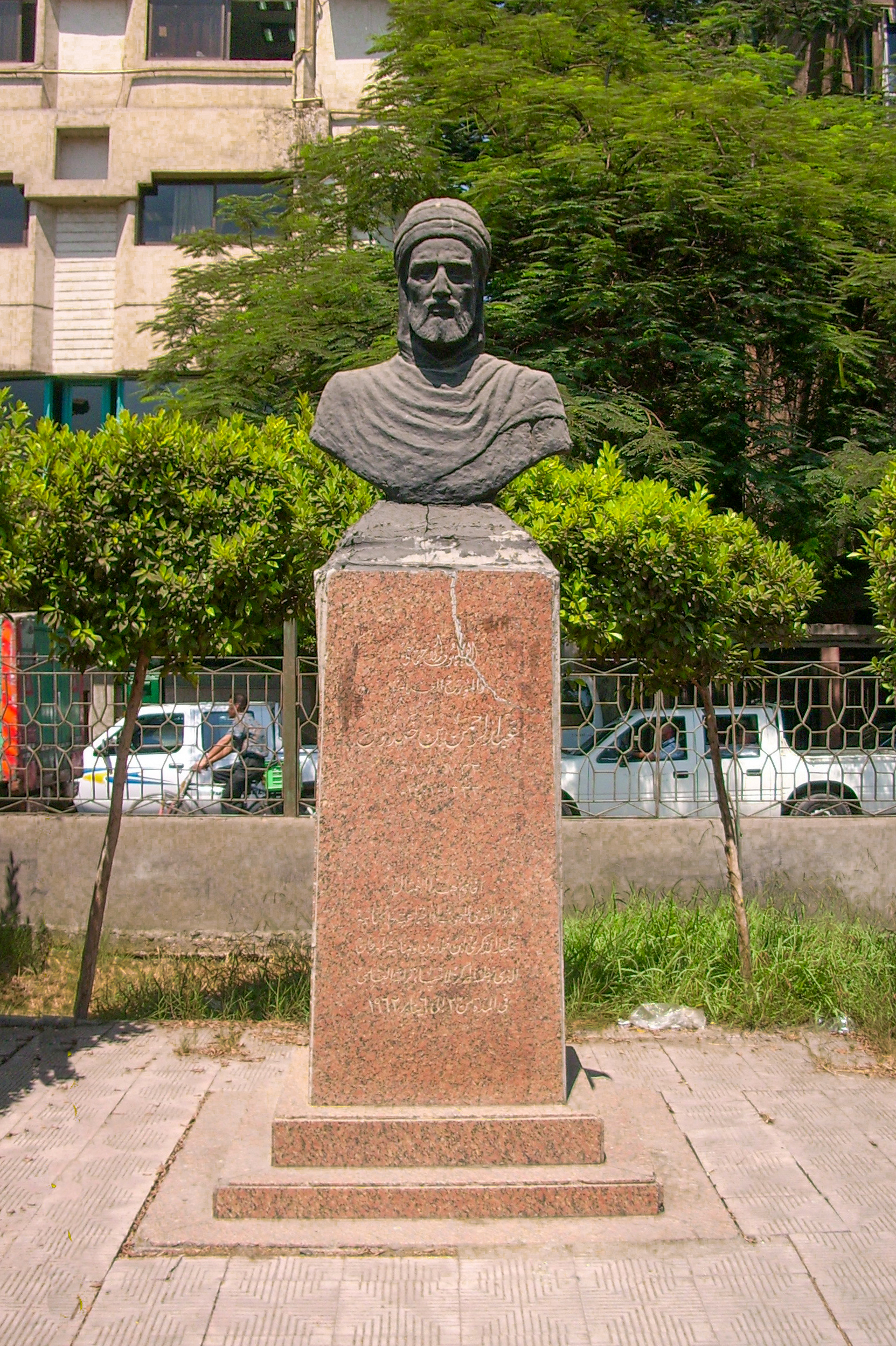
Ibn Khaldun Statue and Square, Mohandessin, Cairo

Ibn Khaldun said of Egypt, "He who has not seen it does not know the power of Islam." While other Islamic regions had to cope with border wars and inner strife, Mamluk Egypt enjoyed prosperity and high culture. In 1384, the Egyptian Sultan, al-Malik udh-Dhahir Barquq, made Khaldun professor of the Qamhiyyah Madrasah and appointed him as the Grand qadi of the Maliki school of fiqh (one of four schools, the Maliki school was widespread primarily in Western Africa). Al-Sakhāwī similarly states that Ibn Khaldūn taught at al-Azhar and was appointed to the Mālikī judgeship in Cairo more than once. Ibn Khaldūn's view on the administration of justice in Egypt was less than favorable, and he had resolved to do his best to reform what he believed to be abuses of the system. He also insisted that the Egyptians were far too easy-going and did not have any sense of urgency for the Day of Judgment. His efforts at reform encountered resistance, however, and within a year, he had to resign his judgeship. Also in 1384, a ship carrying Khaldun's wife and children sank off of Alexandria.

After his return from a pilgrimage to Mecca in May 1388, Ibn Khaldūn concentrated on teaching at various Cairo madrasas. At the Mamluk court he fell from favor because during revolts against Barquq, he had, apparently under duress, with other Cairo jurists, issued a fatwa against Barquq. Later relations with Barquq returned to normal, and he was once again named the Maliki qadi. Altogether, he was called six times to that high office, which, for various reasons, he never held long.

In 1401, under Barquq's successor, his son Faraj, Ibn Khaldūn took part in a military campaign against the Mongol conqueror, Timur, who besieged Damascus in 1400. Ibn Khaldūn cast doubt upon the viability of the venture and really wanted to stay in Egypt. His doubts were vindicated, as the young and inexperienced Faraj, concerned about a revolt in Egypt, left his army to its own devices in Syria and hurried home. Ibn Khaldūn remained at the besieged city for seven weeks, being lowered over the city wall by ropes to negotiate with Timur, in a historic series of meetings that he reported extensively in his autobiography. Timur questioned him in detail about conditions in the lands of the Maghreb. At his request, Ibn Khaldūn even wrote a long report about it. As he recognized Timur's intentions, he did not hesitate, on his return to Egypt, to compose an equally-extensive report on the history of the Tatars, together with a character study of Timur, sending them to the Merinid rulers in Fez.

Ibn Khaldūn spent the next five years in Cairo completing his autobiography and his history of the world and acting as teacher and judge. Meanwhile, he was alleged to have joined an underground party, Rijal Hawa Rijal, whose reform-oriented ideals attracted the attention of local political authorities. The elderly Ibn Khaldun was placed under arrest. He died on 17 March 1406, one month after his sixth selection for the office of the Maliki qadi (Judge).

== Works ==
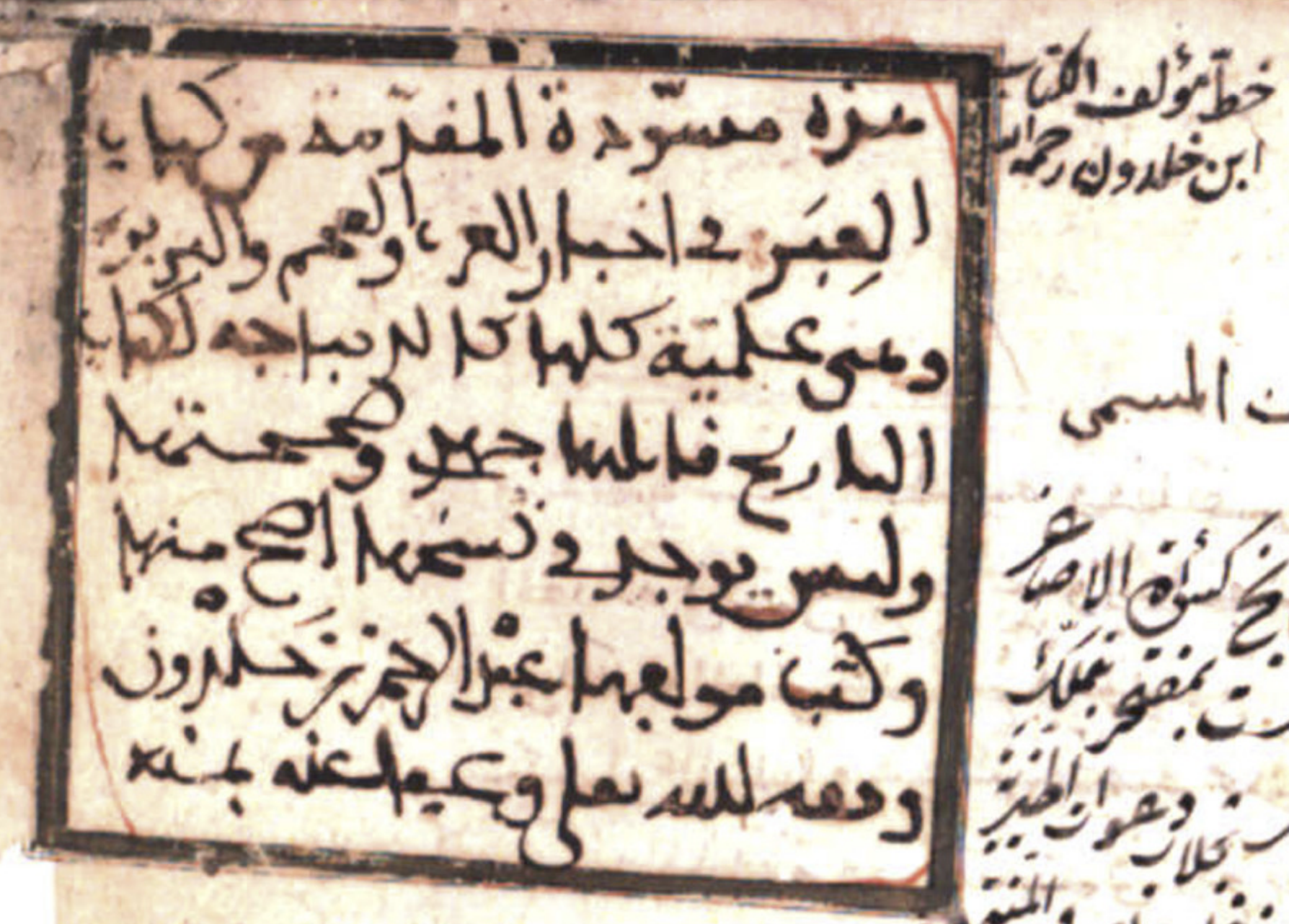
Handwriting of Ibn Khaldūn certifying a manuscript copy of al-Muqaddima, MS Atif Efendi 1936, f. 7a

=== al-Muqaddima and the rest of Kitāb al-ʻIbar ===
- Kitāb al-ʻIbar, (full title: Kitāb al-ʻIbar wa-Dīwān al-Mubtadaʼ wa-l-Khabar fī Taʼrīkh al-ʻArab wa-l-Barbar wa-Man ʻĀṣarahum min Dhawī ash-Shaʼn al-Akbār: "Book of Lessons, Record of Beginnings and Events in the History of the Arabs and the Berbers and Their Powerful Contemporaries"); begun as a history of the Berbers and expanded to a universal history in seven books.

Book 1; Al-Muqaddima ('The Introduction'), a socio-economic-geographical universal history of empires, and the best known of his works.
Books 2–5; World History up to the author's own time.
Books 6–7; Historiography of the Berbers and the Maghreb. Khaldun departs from the classical style of Arab historians (Note: For classical style of Arab historians see Ibrahim ibn ar-Raqīq (~d.1028) and al-Mālikī.) by synthesising multiple, sometimes contradictory, sources without citations. He reproduces some errors originating probably from his 14th-century Fez source, the work Rawḍ al-Qirṭās by Ibn Abi Zar, yet Al-'Ibar remains an invaluable source of Berber history.

Businesses owned by responsible and organized merchants shall eventually surpass those owned by wealthy rulers.
Ibn Khaldun on economic growth and the ideals of Platonism

Concerning the discipline of sociology, he described the dichotomy of sedentary life versus nomadic life as well as the inevitable loss of power that occurs when warriors conquer a city. Al-Sakhāwī describes Kitāb al-ʿIbar as Ibn Khaldūn’s major historical work and notes that it was prefaced with a lengthy introduction addressing civilization (ʿumrān), kingship, livelihood, and the sciences. Encyclopaedia Britannica likewise highlights the Muqaddimah as his best-known work and a landmark statement of his philosophy of history. According to the Arab scholar Sati' al-Husri, the Muqaddimah may be read as a sociological work. The work is based around Ibn Khaldun's central concept of aṣabiyyah, translated as "group cohesiveness" or "solidarity". This social cohesion arises spontaneously in tribes and other small kinship groups; it can be intensified and enlarged by a religious ideology. Ibn Khaldun's analysis looks at how this cohesion carries groups to power but contains within itself the seeds – psychological, sociological, economic, political – of the group's downfall, to be replaced by a new group, dynasty or empire bound by a stronger (or at least younger and more vigorous) cohesion. Some of Ibn Khaldun's views, particularly those concerning the Zanj people of sub-Saharan Africa, have been cited as racist. According to the scholar Abdelmajid Hannoum, Ibn Khaldun's description of the distinctions between Berbers and Arabs were misinterpreted by the translator William McGuckin de Slane, who wrongly inserted a "racial ideology that sets Arabs and Berbers apart and in opposition" into his translation of part of`Ibar translated under the title Histoire des Berbères.

Perhaps the most frequently cited observation drawn from Ibn Khaldūn's work is the notion that when a society becomes a great civilization, its high point is followed by a period of decay. This means that the next cohesive group that conquers the diminished civilization is, by comparison, a group of barbarians. Once the barbarians solidify their control over the conquered society, however, they become attracted to its more refined aspects, such as literacy and arts, and either assimilate into or appropriate such cultural practices. Then, eventually, the former barbarians will be conquered by a new set of barbarians, who will repeat the process.

Georgetown University Professor Ibrahim Oweiss, an economist and historian, argues that Ibn Khaldun was a major forerunner of modern economists and, in particular, originated the labor theory of value long before better known proponents such as Adam Smith and David Ricardo, although Khaldun did not refer to it as either a labor theory of value or theory.

Ibn Khaldun also called for the creation of a science to explain society and went on to outline these ideas in his major work, the Muqaddimah, which states that "Civilization and its well-being, as well as business prosperity, depend on productivity and people's efforts in all directions in their own interest and profit".

Ibn Khaldun diverged from norms that Muslim historians followed and rejected their focus on the credibility of the transmitter and focused instead on the validity of the stories and encouraged critical thinking.

Ibn Khaldun also outlines early theories of division of labor, taxes, scarcity, and economic growth.

He argued that poverty was a result of the destruction of morality and human values. He also looked at what factors contribute to wealth, such as consumption, government, and investment. Khaldun also argued that poverty was not necessarily a result of poor financial decision-making but of external consequences and therefore the government should be involved in alleviating poverty. Researchers from Malaysia's Insaniah University College and Indonesia's Tazkia University College of Islamic Economics created a dynamics model based upon Ibn Khaldun's writings to measure poverty in the Muslim nations of South Asia and Southeast Asia.

Ibn Khaldun also believed that the currency of an Islamic monetary system should have intrinsic value and therefore be made of gold and silver (such as the dirham). He emphasized that the weight and purity of these coins should be strictly followed: the weight of one dinar should be one mithqal (the weight of 72 grains of barley, roughly 4.25 grams) and the weight of 7 dinar should be equal to weight of 10 dirhams (7/10 of a mithqal or 2.96 grams).

Ibn Khaldun's writings regarding the division of labor are often compared to Adam Smith's writings on the topic.

The individual being cannot by himself obtain all the necessities of life. All human beings must co-operate to that end in their civilization. But what is obtained by the cooperation of a group of human beings satisfies the need of a number many times greater than themselves. For instance, no one by himself can obtain the share of the wheat he needs for food. But when six or ten persons, including a smith and a carpenter to make the tools, and others who are in charge of the oxen, the ploughing of, the harvesting of the ripe grain, and all other agricultural activities, undertake to obtain their food and work toward that purpose either separately or collectively and thus obtain through their labour a certain amount of food, that amount will be food for a number of people many times their own. The combined labour produces more than the needs and necessities of the workers (Ibn Khaldun 1958, vol. II 271–272)

In every other art and manufacture, the effects of the division of labour are similar to what they are in this very trifling one [pin production]; though, in many of them, the labour can either be so much subdivided, nor reduced to so great a simplicity of operation. The division of labour, however, so far as it can be introduced, occasions, in every art, a proportionable increase of the productive powers of labour (Smith 1976a, vol. I, 13–24)

Both Ibn Khaldun and Smith shared the idea that the division of labor is fundamental to economic growth, however, the motivations and context for such division differed between them. For Ibn Khaldun, asabiyyah or social solidarity was the underlying motive and context behind the division of labor; for Smith it was self-interest and the market economy.

=== Social thought ===
Ibn Khaldun's epistemology attempted to reconcile mysticism with theology by dividing science into two different categories, the religious science that regards the sciences of the Qur'an and the non-religious science. He further classified the non-religious sciences into intellectual sciences such as logic, arithmetic, geometry, astronomy, etc. and auxiliary sciences such as language, literature, poetry, etc. He also suggested that possibly more divisions will appear in the future with different societies. He tried to adapt to all possible societies' cultural behavior and influence in education, economics and politics. Nonetheless, he didn't think that laws were chosen by just one leader or a small group of individual but mostly by the majority of the individuals of a society.

To Ibn Khaldun, the state was a necessity of human society to restrain injustice within the society, but the state means is force, thus itself an injustice. All societies must have a state governing them in order to establish a society. He attempted to standardize the history of societies by identifying ubiquitous phenomena present in all societies. To him, civilization was a phenomenon that will be present as long as humans exist. He characterized the fulfillment of basic needs as the beginning of civilization. At the beginning, people will look for different ways of increasing productivity of basic needs and expansion will occur. Later the society starts becoming more sedentary and focuses more on crafting, arts and the more refined characteristics. By the end of a society, it will weaken, allowing another small group of individuals to come into control. The conquering group is described as an unsatisfied group within the society itself or a group of desert bandits that constantly attack other weaker or weakened societies.

In the Muqaddimah, his most important work, he discusses an introduction of philosophy to history in a general manner, based on observable patterns within a theoretical framework of known historical events of his time. He described the beginnings, development, cultural trends and the fall of all societies, leading to the rise of a new society which would then follow the same trends in a continuous cycle. Also, he recommended the best political approaches to develop a society according to his knowledge of history. He heavily emphasized that a good society would be one in which a tradition of education is deeply rooted in its culture. Ibn Khaldun introduced the word asabiya (solidarity, group feeling, or group consciousness), to explain tribalism. The concept of asabiya has been translated as "social cohesion", "group solidarity", or "tribalism". This social cohesion arises spontaneously in tribes and other small kinship groups.

Ibn Khaldun believed that too much bureaucracy, such as taxes and legislations, would lead to the decline of a society, since it would constrain the development of more specialized labor (increase in scholars and development of different services). He believed that bureaucrats cannot understand the world of commerce and do not possess the same motivation as a businessman.

In his work the Muqaddimah, Ibn Khaldun emphasizes human beings' faculty to think (fikr) as what determines human behavior and ubiquitous patterns. This faculty is also what inspires human beings to form into a social structure to co-operate in division of labor and organization. According to Zaid Ahmand in Epistemology and the Human Dimension in Urban Studies, the fikr faculty is the supporting pillar for all philosophical aspects of Ibn Khaldun's theory related to human beings' spiritual, intellectual, physical, social and political tendencies.

Another important concept he emphasizes in his work is the mastery of crafts, habits and skills. This takes place after a society is established and according to Ibn Khaldun the level of achievement of a society can be determined by just analyzing these three concepts. A society in its earliest stages is nomadic and primarily concerned with survival, while a society at a later stage is sedentary, with greater achievement in crafts. A society with a sedentary culture and stable politics would be expected to have greater achievements in crafts and technology.

Ibn Khaldun also emphasized in his epistemology the important aspect that educational tradition plays to ensure the new generations of a civilization continuously improve in the sciences and develop culture. Ibn Khaldun argued that without the strong establishment of an educational tradition, it would be very difficult for the new generations to maintain the achievements of the earlier generations, let alone improve them.

Another way to distinguish the achievement of a society would be the language of a society, since for him the most important element of a society would not be land, but the language spoken. He was surprised that many non-Arabs were really successful in the Arabic society, had good jobs and were well received by the community. "These people were non-Arab by descent, but they grew up among the Arabs who possessed the habit of Arabic," Ibn Khaldun once recalled, "[b]ecause of this, they were able to master Arabic so well that they cannot be surpassed." He believed that the reason why non-Arabs were accepted as part of Arab society was due to their mastery of the Arabic language.

Advancements in literary works such as poems and prose were another way to distinguish the achievement of a civilization, but Ibn Khaldun believed that whenever the literary facet of a society reaches its highest levels it ceases to indicate societal achievements anymore, but is an embellishment of life. For logical sciences he established knowledge at its highest level as an increase of scholars and the quality of knowledge. For him the highest level of literary productions would be the manifestation of prose, poems and the artistic enrichment of a society.

=== Religious thought ===
Ibn Khaldun believes that communication between the tangible and intangible world is the basis of every religion, and the credit for its occurrence is the human spirit, as it is the mediator between God and humans. It is immortal by nature and does not perish, and has characteristics that enable it to communicate with God. However, most souls have lost their hidden ability and are connected to the sensory world only. A small number of them still maintain their full ability to communicate with God—the ones God chose to become prophets. Their souls abandon the sensory world in order to receive from God what they should convey to humans, and it is in this manner that all religions arise. He believes that religions that rely on institutions of prediction and reconnaissance are false, but they partly contain some truth. A person's concentration on a specific thing for a long period makes him forget everything and become attached to what he focused on. Only, this focus makes him see the non-sensory world very quickly and in a very imperfect way, and these are pagan religions.

Ibn Khaldun agrees with Sufism and believes that if a person maintains his good faith and is stripped of the desire to create a new religion and strives to separate himself from the sensory world, he will be able to approach the divine essence and the ideas of scholars will appear to him clearly. But if he strives in this detachment and mysticism out of a desire to excel over others, he will not communicate with God, but with demons. Also, the human spirit is able to see some things of the future through vision, but on the condition that this spirit be completely upright and very pious and pure, otherwise the vision will come from the devils.

=== Minor works ===
From other sources we know of several other works, primarily composed during the time he spent in North Africa and Al-Andalus. His first book, Lubābu l-Muhassal, a commentary on the Islamic theology of Fakhr al-Din al-Razi, was written at the age of 19 under the supervision of his teacher Al-Abili in Tunis. A work on Sufism, Shifā'u l-Sā'il, was composed around 1373 in Fes, Morocco. Whilst at the court of Muhammed V, Sultan of Granada, Ibn Khaldūn composed a work on logic, ʻallaqa li-s-Sulṭān.

== Legacy ==
A Laffer curve with a maximum revenue point at around a 70%, as estimated by Trabandt and Uhlig (2009). Laffer cites Ibn Khaldun's observation that "at the beginning of the dynasty, taxation yields a large revenue from small assessments. At the end of the dynasty, taxation yields a small revenue from large assessments."

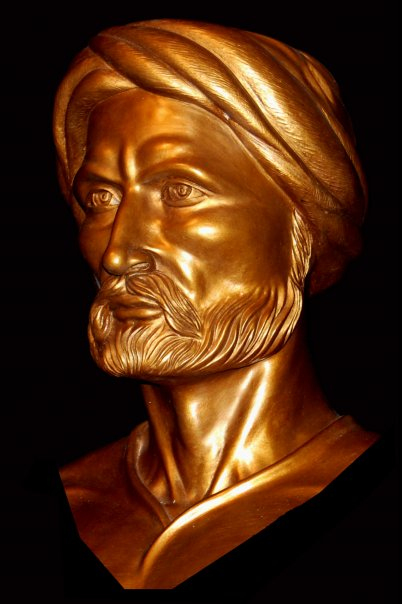
Ibn Khaldun – Life-size bronze bust sculpture of Ibn Khaldun that is part of the collection at the Arab American National Museum (Catalog Number 2010.02). Commissioned by The Tunisian Community Center and Created by Patrick Morelli of Albany, New York, in 2009. It was inspired by the statue of Ibn Khaldun erected at the Avenue Habib Bourguiba in Tunis.

=== Egypt ===
Ibn Khaldun's historical method had very few precedents or followers in his time. While Ibn Khaldun is known to have been a successful lecturer on jurisprudence within religious sciences, only very few of his students were aware of, and influenced by, his Muqaddimah. One such student, Al-Maqrizi, praised the Muqaddimah, although some scholars have found his praise, and that of others, to be generally empty and lacking understanding of Ibn Khaldun's methods.

Ibn Khaldun also faced primarily criticism from his contemporaries, particularly Ibn Hajar al-`Asqalani. These criticisms included accusations of inadequate historical knowledge, an inaccurate title, disorganization, and a style resembling that of the prolific Arab literature writer, Al-Jahiz. Al-Asqalani also noted that Ibn Khaldun was not well-liked in Egypt because he opposed many respected traditions, including the traditional judicial dress, and suggested that this may have contributed to the reception of Ibn Khaldun's historical works. The notable exception to this consensus was Ibn al-Azraq, a jurist who lived shortly after Ibn Khaldun and quoted heavily from the first and fourth books of the Kitab al-‘Ibar, in developing a work of mirrors for princes.

=== Ottoman Empire ===
Ibn Khaldun's work found some recognition with Ottoman intellectuals in the 17th century. The first references to Ibn Khaldun in Ottoman writings appeared in the middle of the 17th century, with historians such as Kâtip Çelebi naming him as a great influence, while another Turkish Ottoman historian, Mustafa Naima, attempted to use Ibn Khaldun's cyclical theory of the rise and fall of empires to describe the Ottoman Empire. Increasing perceptions of the decline of the Ottoman Empire also caused similar ideas to appear independently of Ibn Khaldun in the 16th century, and may explain some of the influence of his works.

=== Europe ===
In Europe, Ibn Khaldun was first brought to the attention of the Western world in 1697, when a biography of him appeared in Barthélemy d'Herbelot de Molainville's Bibliothèque Orientale. However, some scholars believe that Ibn Khaldun's work may have first been introduced to Europe via Ibn Arabshah's biography of Tamerlane, translated to Latin, which covers a meeting between Ibn Khaldun and Tamerlane. According to Ibn Arabshah, during this meeting, Ibn Khaldun and Tamerlane discussed the Maghrib in depth, as well as Tamerlane's genealogy and place in history. Ibn Khaldun began gaining more attention from 1806, when Silvestre de Sacy's Chrestomathie Arabe included his biography together with a translation of parts of the Muqaddimah as the Prolegomena. In 1816, de Sacy again published a biography with a more detailed description on the Prolegomena. More details on and partial translations of the Prolegomena emerged over the years until the complete Arabic edition was published in 1858. Since then, the work of Ibn Khaldun has been extensively studied in the Western world with special interest. Reynold A. Nicholson praised Ibn Khaldun as a uniquely brilliant Muslim sociologist, but discounted Khaldun's influence. Spanish Philosopher José Ortega y Gasset viewed the conflicts of North Africa as a problem that stemmed from a lack of African thought, and praised Ibn Khaldun for making sense of the conflict by simplifying it to the relationship between the nomadic and sedentary modes of life.

=== Modern historians ===
British historian Arnold J. Toynbee has called Ibn Khaldun's Muqaddimah "the greatest work of its kind". Ernest Gellner, once a professor of philosophy and logic at the London School of Economics, considered Khaldun's definition of government (Note: "an institution which prevents injustice other than such as it commits itself") the best in the history of political theory.

More moderate views on the scope of Ibn Khaldun's contributions have also emerged.

Arthur Laffer, for whom the Laffer curve is named, acknowledged that Ibn Khaldun's ideas, as well as others, precede his own work on that curve.

Economist Paul Krugman described Ibn Khaldun as "a 14th-century Islamic philosopher who basically invented what we would now call the social sciences".

19th century Scottish theologian and philosopher Robert Flint praised him strongly, "as a theorist of history he had no equal in any age or country until Vico appeared, more than three hundred years later. Plato, Aristotle, and Augustine were not his peers, and all others were unworthy of being even mentioned along with him". Ibn Khaldun's work on evolution of societies also influenced Egon Orowan, who introduced the concept of socionomy. While Ibn Khaldun's record-keeping is usually passed over in favor of recognizing his contributions to the science of history, Abderrahmane Lakhsassi wrote "No historian of the Maghreb since and particularly of the Berbers can do without his historical contribution."

=== Public recognition ===
Public recognition of Ibn Khaldun has increased in recent years.

In 2004, the Tunisian Community Center launched the first Ibn Khaldun Award to recognize a Tunisian/American high achiever whose work reflects Ibn Khaldun's ideas of kinship and solidarity. The Award was named after Ibn Khaldun for the convergence of his ideas with the organization's objectives and programs. In 2006, the Atlas Economic Research Foundation launched an annual essay contest for students named in Ibn Khaldun's honor. The theme of the contest is "how individuals, think tanks, universities and entrepreneurs can influence government policies to allow the free market to flourish and improve the lives of its citizens based on Islamic teachings and traditions."

In 2006, Spain commemorated the 600th anniversary of the death of Ibn Khaldun by orchestrating an exhibit titled "Encounter of Civilizations: Ibn Khaldun".

In 2015, İbn Haldun Üniversitesi has opened in Istanbul, Turkey, to commemorate his name. The university promotes a policy of trilingualism. The languages in question are English, Modern Turkish, and Arabic and its emphasis is on teaching social sciences.

In 1981 U.S. President Ronald Reagan cited Ibn Khaldun as an influence on his supply-side economic policies, also known as Reaganomics. He paraphrased Ibn Khaldun, who said that "in the beginning of the dynasty, great tax revenues were gained from small assessments," and that "at the end of the dynasty, small tax revenues were gained from large assessments." Reagan said his goal is "trying to get down to the small assessments and the great revenues."

The Iraqi Navy named a frigate after Ibn Khaldun.

In 2025, the American University undergraduate historical journal was renamed the "[ibn] Khaldun Journal of Historical Studies," using a portrait of Ibn Khaldun as their logo.

== Bibliography ==
- Kitāb al-ʻIbar wa-Dīwān al-Mubtadaʼ wa-l-Khabar fī Taʼrīkh al-ʻArab wa-l-Barbar wa-Man ʻĀṣarahum min Dhawī ash-Shaʼn al-Akbār
- Lubābu-l-Muhassal fee Usūlu-d-Dīn
- Shifā'u-s-Sā'il
- ʻAl-Laqaw li-s-Sulṭān
- Ibn Khaldun. 1951 التعريف بإبن خلدون ورحلته غربا وشرقا Al-Taʻrīf bi Ibn-Khaldūn wa Riħlatuhu Għarbān wa Sharqān. Published by Muħammad ibn-Tāwīt at-Tanjī. Cairo (Autobiography in Arabic).
- Ibn Khaldūn. 1958 The Muqaddimah: An introduction to history. Translated from the Arabic by Franz Rosenthal. 3 vols. New York: Princeton.
- Ibn Khaldūn. 1967 The Muqaddimah: An introduction to history. Trans. Franz Rosenthal, ed. N.J. Dawood. (Abridged).
- Ibn Khaldun, 1332–1406. 1905 'A Selection from the Prolegomena of Ibn Khaldūn'. Trans. Duncan Macdonald

== See also ==
- Al-Zahrawi
- Chanakya
- Historical recurrence
- Historiography of early Islam
- Ibn Arabi
- Ibn Tufayl
- List of Muslim historians
- List of pre-modern Arab scientists and scholars
- Sayyid Husayn Ahlati
- Science in the medieval Islamic world
- Ibn Inabah
- Ibn Sufi
