= Ibn al-Azraq =

Andalusian scholar and jurist

- Title: Supreme Judge of Granada

Personal life
- Born: Abū 'Abd-Allāh Ibn al-Azraq; 1427 Málaga, Al-Andalus
- Died: 1491 (aged 63–64) Jerusalem
- Notable work(s): Marvel of State Conduct, and the Nature of Authority
- Occupation: Jurist, Judge

Religious life
- Religion: Islam
- Denomination: Sunni
- School: Maliki

Muslim leader
- Influenced by: Ibn Khaldun

Abū 'Abd-Allāh Ibn al-Azraq (Arabic: ابن الأزرق) was a Muslim jurist born in Málaga, Al Andalus in 1427.

Educated in law in Málaga and Granada, he became a judge in Guadix, Málaga, and finally became the Supreme Judge of Granada under Sultan Abu al-Hasan. Ibn al-Azraq wrote a book on statecraft, in which he commented the work of Ibn Khaldun, entitled Marvel of State conduct, and the nature of authority.

In 1487, he was sent by the Nasrid dynasty as an envoy to Mamluk Egypt, in order to obtain help against the Spanish offensive against Granada. At the same time, two envoys were sent to the Ottoman Empire, with the same request for help, one from Xàtiva, and a certain Pacoret from Paterna. As his mission was fruitless, he remained in the Orient, and became judge in Jerusalem in 1491. He died the same year after a few months.
