= Lubab al-Muhassal =

1351 book by Ibn Khaldūn

Lubābu l-Muhassal (Gist of the Compendium)
- Author: Ibn Khaldūn
- Original title: Lubab al-Muhassal fi Usul al-Din
- Translator: P. Luciano Rubio
- Language: Arabic
- Subject: Islamic theology
- Publisher: Tetuan
- Publication date: 1351
- English publication date: 1952

Lubābu l-Muhassal fi Usul al-Din (لباب المحصل في أصول الدين) is a book on Islamic theology by the scholar Ibn Khaldūn, written in around 1351 (752 AH). The book was Khaldūn's first work, written when he was 19 or 20 years old. Lubābu l-Muhassal is a commentary on Muhassal Afkar al-Mutaqaddimin wa al-Muta'akhkhirin, a work on theology by Fakhr al-Din al-Razi. Khaldūn wrote the book under the supervision of his teacher al-Ābilī while living in Tunis, Tunisia.

Although Ibn Khaldūn had written the book in Tunis, it was only in manuscript form, however, it was undoubtedly prepared by Khaldūn sometime between 1372 (774 AH) and 1374 (776 AH), while living in Fez, Morocco. Both the later copies as well as the 1351 original manuscript are still extant, written in the author's handwriting.

An English translation of Khaldūn's work, entitled Treatise in Logic, was published in 1952.

The book is thought to be something of an exam paper or final project for his master, Al-Abili; the book testifies to Ibn Khaldūn's early grasp of the philosophical and theological material of the Takhlis al-Muhassal, a standard work of kalam.

== See also ==
- Asas al-Taqdis
- Al-Insaf fima Yajib I'tiqaduh
- A Guide to Conclusive Proofs for the Principles of Belief
- The Moderation in Belief
- List of Sunni books
