= Abu Yahya ibn al-Sakkak =

Moroccan historian, genealogist, judge, Maliki scholar and Sufi mystic

Personal life
- Born: Fez, Morocco
- Died: 22 May 1415
- Era: 14th-15th century
- Main interest(s): Islamic jurisprudence, Sufism
- Notable idea: Skepticism about the divine right claimed by rulers
- Known for: Author of Nush muluk al-islam bi-al-tarif bi-ma yajibu alay-him min huquq ila bayt al-kiram
- Occupation: Historian, Genealogist, Judge, Maliki Scholar, Sufi Mystic

Religious life
- Religion: Islam
- Creed: Maliki

Muslim leader
- Influenced by: Ibn Khaldun, al-Sharif al-Tilimsani

Abu Yahya ibn al-Sakkak al-Miknasi (Arabic: ابن السكاك المكناسي) (full name: Abu Yahya or Abu Abd Allah Mohammed ibn Abu Ghalib ibn Ahmad ibn Mohammed ibn Abu-l-Hasan Ali ibn Mohammed ibn as-Sakkak al-Miknasi; d. 22 May 1415), was a Moroccan historian, genealogist, judge, Maliki scholar and Sufi mystic. He was born in Fez into the Ibn al-Sakkak family, a Berber family from the Miknasa tribe. He was a friend of Ibn Khaldun, they both studied under al-Sharif al-Tilimsani. al-Sakkak was especially well known as author of an advice to Muslim kings, Nush muluk al-islam bi-al-tarif bi-ma yajibu alay-him min huquq ila bayt al-kiram. In his advice Ibn Sakkak expressed skepticism about the divine right claimed by some rulers in his time.

Ibn Sakkak is also the author of Kitab al-Uslub min-al-kalam ‘ala la hawla wa-la quwwata illa billah (known as Kitab al-Asalib), the first book about the Tariqa Shadhiliyya in Morocco, in which he used the name "Shadhili" for Ibn Abbad al-Rundi (d. 792/1377).
