= List of caliphs =

A caliph is the supreme religious and political leader of an Islamic state known as the caliphate. Caliphs (also known as 'Khalifas') led the Muslim Ummah as political successors to the Islamic prophet Muhammad, and widely recognised caliphates have existed in various forms for most of Islamic history.

The first caliphate, the Rashidun Caliphate, was ruled by the four Rashidun caliphs (Arabic: الخلفاء الراشدون, lit. 'Rightly Guided Caliphs'), Abu Bakr, Umar, Uthman and Ali, who are considered by Sunni Muslims to have been the most virtuous and pure caliphs. They were chosen by popular acclamation or by a small committee, in contrast with the following caliphates, which were mostly hereditary. On the other hand, Shia Muslims only recognise the Twelve Imams and consider the first three caliphs to be usurpers.

The Rashidun Caliphate ended with the First Fitna, which transferred authority to the Umayyad dynasty that presided over the Umayyad Caliphate, the largest caliphate and the last one to actively rule the entire Islamic world.

The Abbasid Revolution overthrew the Umayyads and instituted the Abbasid dynasty which ruled over the Abbasid Caliphate. The Abbasid Caliphate was initially strong and united, but gradually fractured into several states whose rulers only paid lip service to the caliph in Baghdad. There were also rivals to the Abbasids who claimed the caliphates for themselves, such as the Isma'ili Shia Fatimids, the Sunni Umayyads in Córdoba and the Almohads, who followed their own doctrine. When Baghdad fell to the Mongols, the Abbasid family relocated to Cairo, where they continued to claim caliphal authority, but had no political power, and actual authority was in the hands of the Mamluk Sultanate.

After the Ottoman conquest of Egypt, the Abbasid caliph Al-Mutawakkil III was taken to Constantinople, where he surrendered the caliphate to Sultan Selim I. The caliphate then remained in the House of Osman until after World War I. The Ottoman Sultanate was abolished in 1922 by the Government of the Grand National Assembly, led by Mustafa Kemal Atatürk. The head of the House of Osman, Abdülmecid II, retained the title of caliph until 1924, when the Ottoman Caliphate was abolished by Atatürk and the newly proclaimed Republic of Turkey.

Since the abolition of the Ottoman Caliphate, no single caliph of Islam has currently been recognized across the Islamic world, although various groups have made limited or disputed claims.

== Rashidun Caliphate (632–661) ==
No.	Calligraphic name	Name	Reign	Lifespan	Relationship with Muhammad
1		Abu Bakr أبو بكر الصدّيق عبد الله بن أبي قحافة; Abū Bakr as-Ṣiddīq ʿAbd Allāh ibn Abī Quḥāfa	8 June 632 – 23 August 634 (~2 years)	573 – 23 August 634 (aged 61)	Father of Aisha, Muhammad's wife
2		Umar I أبو حفص عمر الفاروق بن الخطّاب; Abū Ḥafṣ ʿUmar al-Fārūq ibn al-Khaṭṭāb	23 August 634 – 6 November 644 (~10 years)	584 – 6 November 644 (aged 60)	Father of Hafsa, Muhammad's wife
3		Uthman أبو عبدالله عثمان ذو النورين بن عفّان; Abū ʿAbd Allāh ʿUthmān Dhū al-Nūrayn ibn ʿAffān	6 November 644 – 17 June 656 (~12 years)	576 – 17 June 656 (aged 80)	Husband of Muhammad's daughters, Ruqayya and later Umm Kulthum
4		Ali أبو الحسن علي المرتضى بن أبي طالب; Abū al-Ḥasan ʿAlī al-Murtaḍā ibn Abī Ṭālib	17 June 656 – 28 January 661 (~5 years)	600 or 601 – 28 January 661 (aged 63)	Muhammad's cousin, and husband of his daughter Fatima

== Umayyad Caliphate (661–750) ==
No.	Coin (Note: Before Abd al-Malik's introduction of Islamic coinage, caliphs continued using Byzantine and Sasanian coins, albeit with slight modifications, such as Bismillah and the caliph's name and title of Amir al-Mu'minin.)	Name	Reign	Lifespan	Parents
1		Mu'awiya I أبو عبد الرحمن معاوية بن أبي سفيان; Abū ʿAbd al-Raḥmān Muʿāwiya ibn Abī Sufyān	28 July 661 – 27 April 680 (~19 years)	597-605 – 27 April 680 (aged 75–83)	Abu Sufyan ibn Harb ibn Umayya; Hind bint Utba
2		Yazid I أبو خالد يزيد بن معاوية; Abū Khālid Yazīd ibn Muʿāwiya	27 April 680 – 11 November 683 (~3 years)	646 – 11 November 683 (aged 37)	Mu'awiya I; Maysun bint Bahdal
3		Mu'awiya II معاوية بن يزيد; Muʿāwiya ibn Yazīd	11 November 683 – June 684 (~7 months)	664 – 684 (aged 20)	Yazid I; Fakhitah bint Abi Hisham
4		Marwan I أبو عبد الملك مروان بن الحكم; Abū ʿAbd al-Malik Marwān ibn al-Ḥakam	June 684 – 12 April 685 (~10 months)	623/626 – April/May 685 (aged 59-63)	al-Hakam ibn Abi al-As ibn Umayya; Amina bint Alqama
5		Abd al-Malik أبو الوليد عبد الملك بن مروان; Abū al-Walīd ʿAbd al-Malik ibn Marwān	12 April 685 – 8 October 705 (~20 years)	July 644/647 – 9 October 705 (aged 58-61)	Marwan I; A'isha bint Mu'awiya
6		al-Walid I أبو العباس الوليد بن عبد الملك; Abū al-ʿAbbās al-Walīd ibn ʿAbd al-Malik	8 October 705 – 23 February 715 (~9 years)	July 674 – 23 February 715 (aged 41)	Abd al-Malik; Wallada bint al-Abbas
7		Sulayman أبو أيوب سليمان بن عبد الملك; Abū Ayyūb Sulaymān ibn ʿAbd al-Malik	23 February 715 – 22 September 717 (~2 years)	675 – 24 September 717 (aged 42)	Abd al-Malik; Wallada bint al-Abbas
8		Umar II أبو حفص عمر بن عبد العزيز; Abū Ḥafṣ ʿUmar ibn ʿAbd al-ʿAzīz	22 September 717 – 4 February 720 (~2 years)	680 – 5 February 720 (aged 40)	Abd al-Aziz ibn Marwan; Layla bint Asim
9		Yazid II أبو خالد يزيد بن عبد الملك; Abū Khālid Yazīd ibn ʿAbd al-Malik	4 February 720 – 26 January 724 (~4 years)	690/691 – 26 January 724 (aged 33-34)	Abd al-Malik; Atika bint Yazid I
10		Hisham أبو الوليد هشام بن عبد الملك; Abū al-Walīd Hishām ibn ʿAbd al-Malik	26 January 724 – 6 February 743 (~19 years)	691 – 6 February 743 (aged 52)	Abd al-Malik; A'isha bint Hisham
11		al-Walid II أبو العباس الوليد بن يزيد; Abū al-ʿAbbās al-Walīd ibn Yazīd	6 February 743 – 17 April 744 (~1 year)	709 – 17 April 744 (aged 35)	Yazid II; Umm al-Hajjaj bint Muhammad
12		Yazid III يزيد بن الوليد; Yazīd ibn al-Walīd	17 April 744 – 4 October 744 (~6 months)	701 – 4 October 744 (aged 43)	al-Walid I; Shah-i Afrid, a Persian princess
13		Ibrahim إبراهيم بن الوليد; Ibrāhīm ibn al-Walīd	4 October 744 – 4 December 744 (~2 months)	d. January 750	al-Walid I; Su'ar/Budayra, concubine
14		Marwan II أبو عبد الملك مروان بن محمد; Abū ʿAbd al-Malik Marwān ibn Muḥammad	4 December 744 – 25 January 750 (~5 years)	691 – 6 August 750 (aged 59)	Muhammad ibn Marwan; Rayya/Taruba, concubine

== Abbasid Caliphate (750–1258) ==
No.	Coin	Name (Note: Abbasids began the tradition of using theologically loaded laqabs as regnal honorifics, which was also adopted by later rival caliphates of Fatimids, Almohads, and Umayyads of Cordoba. In both Western and Islamic historiography, the caliphs are referred to by these regnal titles.)	Reign	Lifespan	Parents
1		al-Saffah أبو العباس عبدالله السفّاح; Abū’l-ʿAbbās ʿAbd Allāh al-Saffāḥ	750 – 8 June 754 (~4 years)	721 – 8 June 754 (aged 33)	Muhammad ibn Ali; Rayta bint Ubaydallah
2		al-Mansur أبو جعفر عبد الله المنصور; Abū Jaʿfar ʿAbd Allāh al-Manṣūr	10 June 754 – October 775 (~21 years)	714 – October 775 (aged 61)	Muhammad ibn Ali; Sallamah, Berber concubine
3		al-Mahdi أبو عبد الله محمد المهدي; Abū ʿAbd Allāh Muḥammad al-Mahdī	October 775 – August 785 (~10 years)	744/745 – August 785 (aged 40-41)	al-Mansur; Arwa bint Mansur al-Himyari
4		al-Hadi أبو محمد موسى الهادي; Abū Muḥammad Mūsā al-Hādī	August 785 – 14 September 786 (~1 year)	759 / 762 – 14 September 786 (aged 24-27)	al-Mahdi; al-Khayzuran bint Atta
5		al-Rashid أبو جعفر هارون الرشيد; Abū Jaʿfar Hārūn al-Rashīd	14 September 786 – 24 March 809 (~23 years)	March 763 / February 766 – 24 March 809 (aged 43-46)	al-Mahdi; al-Khayzuran bint Atta
6		al-Amin أبو موسى محمد الأمين; Abū Mūsā Muḥammad al-Amīn	24 March 809 – 25 September 813 (~4 years)	April 787 – 25 September 813 (aged 26)	al-Rashid; Zubaidah bint Ja'far ibn al-Mansur
7		al-Ma'mun أبو العباس عبد الله المأمون; Abū'l-ʿAbbās ʿAbd Allāh al-Maʾmūn	25 September 813 – 9 August 833 (~20 years)	14 September 786 – 9 August 833 (aged 46)	al-Rashid; Marajil, Persian concubine
8		al-Mu'tasim أبو إسحاق محمد المعتصم بالله; Abū Isḥāq Muḥammad al-Muʿtaṣim bi-'llāh	9 August 833 – 5 January 842 (~9 years)	October 796 – 5 January 842 (aged 45)	al-Rashid; Maridah, Turkic concubine
9		al-Wathiq أبو جعفر هارون الواثق بالله; Abū Jaʿfar Hārūn al-Wāthiq bi-'llāh	5 January 842 – 10 August 847 (~5 years)	18 April 812 – 10 August 847 (aged 35)	al-Mu'tasim; Qaratis, Greek concubine
10		al-Mutawakkil أبو الفضل جعفر المتوكل على الله; Abū'l-Faḍl Jaʿfar al-Mutawakkil ʿalā 'llāh	10 August 847 – 11 December 861 (~14 years)	31 March 822 – 11 December 861 (aged 39)	al-Mu'tasim; Shuja, Khwarazmian concubine
11		al-Muntasir أبو جعفر محمد المنتصر بالله; Abū Jaʿfar Muḥammad al-Muntaṣir bi-'llāh	11 December 861 – 7 June 862 (~1 year)	November 837 – 7 June 862 (aged 24)	al-Mutawakkil; Hubshiya, Greek concubine
12		al-Musta'in أبو العباس أحمد المستعين بالله; Abū al-ʿAbbās Aḥmad al-Mustaʿīn bi-ʾllāh	8 June 862 – 24 January 866 (~4 years)	836 – 17 October 866 (aged 30)	Muhammad ibn al-Mu'tasim; Makhariq, Sicilian concubine
13		al-Mu'tazz أبو عبد الله محمد المعتز بالله; Abū ʿAbd Allāh Muḥammad al-Muʿtazz bi-ʾllāh	25 January 866 – 13 July 869 (~3 years)	847 – 16 July 869 (aged 22)	al-Mutawakkil; Qabiha, Greek concubine
14		al-Muhtadi أبو إسحاق محمد المهتدي بالله; Abū Isḥāq Muḥammad al-Muhtadī bi-'llāh	22 July 869 – 21 June 870 (~1 year)	833 – 21 June 870 (aged 37)	al-Wathiq; Qurb, Greek concubine
15		al-Mu'tamid أبو العباس أحمد المعتمد على الله; Abū'l-ʿAbbās Aḥmad al-Muʿtamid ʿalā ’llāh	21 June 870 – 14 October 892 (~22 years)	842 – 14 October 892 (aged 50)	al-Mutawakkil; Fityan, Greek concubine
16		al-Mu'tadid أبو العباس أحمد المعتضد بالله; Abū'l-ʿAbbās Aḥmad al-Muʿtaḍid bi-'llāh	15 October 892 – 5 April 902 (~10 years)	864 / 861 – 5 April 902 (aged 38-41)	al-Muwaffaq; Dirar, Greek concubine
17		al-Muktafi أبو محمد علي المكتفي بالله; Abū Muḥammad ʿAlī al-Muktafī bi-'llāh	5 April 902 – 13 August 908 (~6 years)	877 / 888 – 13 August 908 (aged 20-31)	al-Mu'tadid; Jijak, Turkic concubine
18		al-Muqtadir أبو الفضل جعفر المقتدر بالله; Abū'l-Faḍl Jaʿfar al-Muqtadir bi-'llāh	13 August 908 – 31 October 932 (~24 years)	13 November 895 – 31 October 932 (aged 36)	al-Mu'tadid; Shaghab, Greek concubine
19		al-Qahir أبو المنصور محمد القاهر بالله; Abū al-Manṣūr Muḥammad al-Qāhir bi-'llāh	31 October 932 – 24 April 934 (~2 years)	899 – 950 (aged 51)	al-Mu'tadid; Fitnah, Berber concubine
20		al-Radi أبو العباس أحمد الراضي بالله; Abū'l-ʿAbbās Aḥmad al-Rāḍī bi-'llāh	24 April 934 – 13 December 940 (~6 years)	20 December 909 – 13 December 940 (aged 30)	al-Muqtadir; Zalum, Greek concubine
21		al-Muttaqi أبو إسحاق إبراهيم المتقي لله; Abū Isḥāq Ibrāhīm al-Muttaqī li-'llāh	15 December 940 – 26 August 944 (~4 years)	908 – July 968 (aged 60)	al-Muqtadir; Khalub, Greek concubine
22		al-Mustakfi أبو القاسم عبد الله المستكفي بالله; Abū'l-Qāsim ʿAbd Allāh al-Mustakfī bi-ʾllāh	September 944 – 29 January 946 (~2 years)	11 November 908 – September 949 (aged 40)	al-Muktafi; Ghusn, Greek concubine
23		al-Muti أبو القاسم الفضل المطيع لله; Abū'l-Qāsim al-Faḍl al-Muṭīʿ li-ʾllāh	29 January 946 – 5 August 974 (~28 years)	913/14 – 12 October 974 (aged 60-61)	al-Muqtadir; Mash'ala, Slavic concubine
24		al-Ta'i أبو بكر عبد الكريم الطائع لأمر الله; Abū Bakr ʿAbd al-Karīm al-Ṭāʾiʿ li-amri ʿllāh	5 August 974 – 22 November 991 (~17 years)	929 – 3 August 1003 (aged 74)	al-Muti; Utb, Greek concubine
25		al-Qadir أبو العباس أحمد القادر بالله; Abū'l-ʿAbbās Aḥmad al-Qādir bi-'llāh	22 November 991 – 29 November 1031 (~40 years)	28 September 947 – 29 November 1031 (aged 84)	Ishaq ibn al-Muqtadir; Tammani/Dimna, concubine
26		al-Qa'im أبو جعفر عبد الله القائم بأمر الله; Abū Jaʿfar ʿAbd Allāh al-Qāʾim bi-amri 'llāh	29 November 1031 – 3 April 1075 (~44 years)	8 November 1001 – 3 April 1075 (aged 73)	al-Qadir; Qatr al-Nada, Armenian concubine
27		al-Muqtadi أبو القاسم عبد الله المقتدي بأمر الله; Abū'l-Qāsim ʿAbd Allāh al-Muqtadī bi-amri ’llāh	3 April 1075 – 3 February 1094 (~19 years)	24 July 1056 – 3 February 1094 (aged 37)	Muhammad ibn al-Qa'im; Urjuwuan, Armenian concubine
28		al-Mustazhir أبو العباس أحمد المستظهر بالله; Abū l-ʿAbbās Aḥmad al-Mustaẓhir bi-'llāh	3 February 1094 – 6 August 1118 (~24 years)	April / May 1078 – 6 August 1118 (aged 40)	al-Muqtadi; Tayf al-Khayal, Turkic concubine
29		al-Mustarshid أبو المنصور الفضل المسترشد بالله; Abū'l-Manṣūr al-Faḍl al-Mustarshid bi-'llāh	6 August 1118 – 29 August 1135 (~17 years)	April / May 1092 – 29 August 1135 (aged 43)	al-Mustazhir; Lubaba, Slavic concubine
30		al-Rashid أبو جعفر المنصور الراشد بالله; Abū Jaʿfar al-Manṣūr al-Rāshid bi-'llāh	29 August 1135 – 17 August 1136 (~1 year)	1109 – 6 June 1138 (aged 29)	al-Mustarshid; Khushf, Iraqi concubine
31		al-Muqtafi أبو عبد الله محمد المقتفي لأمر الله; Abū ʿAbd Allāh Muḥammad al-Muqtafī li-ʾamri ’llāh	17 September 1136 – 12 March 1160 (~24 years)	9 April 1096 – 12 March 1160 (aged 63)	al-Mustazhir; Ashin, Syrian concubine
32		al-Mustanjid أبو المظفر يوسف المستنجد بالله; Abū'l-Muẓaffar Yūsuf al-Mustanjid bi-'llāh	12 March 1160 – 18 December 1170 (~10 years)	1124 – 18 December 1170 (aged 46)	al-Muqtafi; Thawus, Greek concubine
33		al-Mustadi أبو محمد الحسن المستضيء بأمر الله; Abū Muḥammad al-Ḥasan al-Mustaḍīʾ bi-amri ʾllāh	18 December 1170 – 27 March 1180 (~10 years)	1142 – 27 March 1180 (aged 38)	al-Mustanjid; Ghadha, Armenian concubine
34		al-Nasir أبو العباس أحمد الناصر لدين الله; Abū'l-ʿAbbās Aḥmad al-Nāṣir li-Dīn Allāh	27 March 1180 – 5 October 1225 (~45 years)	6 August 1158 – 5 October 1225 (aged 67)	al-Mustadi; Zumurrud, Turkic concubine
35		al-Zahir أبو نصر محمد الظاهر بأمر الله; Abū Naṣr Muḥammad al-Ẓāhir bi-amri’llāh	5 October 1225 – 10 July 1226 (~9 months)	1175 – 10 July 1226 (aged 51)	al-Nasir; Asma
36		al-Mustansir أبو جعفر المنصور المستنصر بالله; Abū Jaʿfar al-Manṣūr al-Mustanṣir bi-'llāh	10 July 1226 – 5 December 1242 (~16 years)	17 February 1192 – 5 December 1242 (aged 50)	al-Zahir; Zahra, Turkic concubine
37		al-Musta'sim أبو أحمد عبد الله المستعصم بالله; Abū Aḥmad ʿAbd Allāh al-Mustaʿṣim bi-'llāh	5 December 1242 – 20 February 1258 (~16 years)	1213 – 20 February 1258 (aged 45)	al-Mustansir; Hajer, Abyssinian concubine

During the later period of Abbasid rule, Muslim rulers began using other titles, such as Amir al-umara and Sultan.

== Fatimid Caliphate (909–1171) ==
No.	Coin	Name	Reign	Lifespan	Parents
1		al-Mahdi أبو محمد عبد الله المهدي بالله; Abū Muḥammad ʿAbd Allāh al-Mahdī bi'llāh	27 August 909 – 4 March 934 (~24 years)	31 July 874 – 4 March 934 (aged 60)	al-Husayn ibn Ahmad
2		al-Qa'im أبو القاسم محمد القائم بأمر الله; Abū'l-Qāsim Muḥammad al-Qāʾim bi-Amr Allāh	4 March 934 – 17 May 946 (~12 years)	March/April 893 – 17 May 946 (aged 53)	al-Mahdi; Bint Abu'l-Shalaghlagh
3		al-Mansur أبو طاهر إسماعيل المنصور بنصر الله; Abū Ṭāhir Ismāʿīl al-Manṣūr bi-Naṣr Allāh	17 May 946 – 18 March 953 (~7 years)	January 914 – 18 March 953 (aged 39)	al-Qa'im; Karima, Ifriqiyan concubine
4		al-Mu'izz أبو تميم معد المعز لدين الله; Abū Tamīm Maʿadd al-Muʿizz li-Dīn Allāh	19 March 953 – 18 December 975 (~22 years)	26 September 931 – 18 December 975 (aged 44)	al-Mansur
5		al-Aziz أبو منصور نزار العزيز بالله; Abū Manṣūr Nizār al-ʿAzīz bi'llāh	18 December 975 – 13 October 996 (~21 years)	10 May 955 – 13 October 996 (aged 41)	al-Mu'izz; Durzan al-Mu'izziya
6		al-Hakim أبو علي منصور الحاكم بأمر الله; Abū ʿAlī Manṣūr al-Ḥākim bi-Amr Allāh	14 October 996 – 13 February 1021 (~25 years)	13 August 985 – 13 February 1021 (aged 36)	al-Aziz; al-Sayyida al-Aziziyyah
7		al-Zahir أبو الحسن علي الظاهر لإعزاز دين الله; Abū'l-Ḥasan ʿAlī al-Ẕāhir li-Iʿzāz Dīn Allāh	13 February 1021 – 13 June 1036 (~15 years)	20 June 1005 – 13 June 1036 (aged 31)	al-Hakim; Amina bint Abdallah ibn al-Mu'izz
8		al-Mustansir أبو تميم معد المستنصر بالله; Abū Tamīm Maʿadd al-Mustanṣir bi'llāh	13 June 1036 – 29 December 1094 (~59 years)	2 July 1029 – 29 December 1094 (aged 65)	al-Zahir; Rasad, Nubian concubine
9		al-Musta'li أبو القاسم أحمد المستعلي بالله; Abū'l-Qāsim Aḥmad al-Mustaʿlī bi'llāh	29 December 1094 – 12 December 1101 (~6 years)	16 September 1074 – 12 December 1101 (aged 27)	al-Mustansir
10		al-Amir أبو علي منصور الآمر بأحكام الله; Abū ʿAlī Manṣūr al-Āmir bi-Aḥkām Allāh	1101 – 8 October 1130 (~29 years)	31 December 1096 – 8 October 1130 (aged 34)	al-Musta'li
Interregnum & Civil War (Note: al-Amir was only survived by the infant al-Tayyib. Abd al-Majid, the oldest surviving grandson of al-Mustansir, took over as regent. The army rebelled and installed Kutayfat as vizier, who tried to abolish the dynasty, but was killed by Fatimid loyalists.) (1130-1132)
11		al-Hafiz أبو الميمون عبد المجيد الحافظ لدين الله; Abū'l-Maymūn ʿAbd al-Majīd al-Ḥāfiẕ li-Dīn Allāh	23 January 1132 – 8 October 1149 (~17 years)	1074/5 – 8 October 1149 (aged 75)	Muhammad ibn al-Mustansir
12		al-Zafir أبو منصور إسماعيل الظافر بأمر الله; Abū Manṣūr Ismāʿīl al-Ẕāfir bi-Amr Allāh	1149 – March 1154 (~5 years)	February 1133 – March 1154 (aged 21)	al-Hafiz
13		al-Fa'iz أبو القاسم عيسى الفائز بنصر الله; Abū'l-Qāsim ʿĪsā al-Fāʾiz bi-Naṣr Allāh	1154 – 23 July 1160 (~6 years)	1149 – 23 July 1160 (aged 11)	al-Zafir
14		al-Adid أبو محمد عبد الله العاضد لدين الله; Abū Muḥammad ʿAbd Allāh al-ʿĀḍid li-Dīn Allāh	1160 – 13 September 1171 (~11 years)	16 May 1151 – 13 September 1171 (aged 20)	Yusuf ibn al-Hafiz

== Mamluk Abbasid dynasty (1261–1517) ==
The Cairene Abbasids were largely ceremonial caliphs under the patronage of the Mamluk Sultanate of Egypt.

No.	Name	Reign	Lifespan	Parents
1	al-Mustansir أبو القاسم أحمد المستنصر بالله; Abū'l-Qāsim Aḥmad al-Mustanṣir bi-llāh	13 June 1261 – 28 November 1261 (~5 months)	d. 28 November 1261	al-Zahir
2	al-Hakim I أبو العباس أحمد الحاكم بأمر الله; Abū'l-ʿAbbās Aḥmad al-Ḥākim bi-Amri'llāh	16 November 1262 – 19 January 1302 (~39 years)	1222/1232 – 19 January 1302 (aged 70/80)	al-Hasan ibn Ali ibn Abu Bakr ibn al-Mustarshid
3	al-Mustakfi I أبو الربيع سليمان المستكفي بالله; Abū ar-Rabīʿ Sulaymān al-Mustakfī bi-llāh	20 January 1302 – February 1340 (~38 years)	1285 – February 1340 (aged 56)	al-Hakim I; Turkic concubine
4	al-Wathiq I أبو إسحاق إبراهيم الواثق بالله; Abū Isḥāq Ibrāhīm al-Wāthiq bi-'llāh	May 1340 – 17 June 1341 (~1 year)	d. November 1347	Ahmad ibn al-Hakim I
5	al-Hakim II أبو العباس أحمد الحاكم بأمر الله; Abū'l-ʿAbbās Aḥmad al-Ḥākim bi-Amri'llāh	17 June 1341 – 1352 (~11 years)	d. 1352	al-Mustakfi I
6	al-Mu'tadid I أبو الفتح أبو بكر المعتضد بالله; Abū al-Fatḥ Abū Bakr al-Muʿtaḍid bi-'llāh	28 September 1352 – March 1362 (~10 years)	d. March 1362	al-Mustakfi I
7	al-Mutawakkil I أبو عبد الله محمد المتوكل على الله; Abū ʿAbd Allāh Muḥammad al-Mutawakkil ʿalā'llāh	March 1362 – 11 July 1377 (~15 years)	1339 – 18 January 1406 (aged 67)	al-Mu'tadid I
8	al-Musta'sim أبو يحيى زكريا المستعصم بالله; Abū Yaḥyā Zakariyyāʾ al-Mustaʿṣim bi-'llāh	11 July 1377 – July 1377 (<2 weeks)	d. 1399	al-Wathiq I
(7)	al-Mutawakkil I أبو عبد الله محمد المتوكل على الله; Abū ʿAbd Allāh Muḥammad al-Mutawakkil ʿalā'llāh	July 1377 – September 1383 (~6 years)	1339 – 18 January 1406 (aged 67)	al-Mu'tadid I
9	al-Wathiq II أبو حفص عمر الواثق بالله; Abū Ḥafṣ ʿUmar al-Wāthiq bi-'llāh	September 1383 – 13 November 1386 (~3 years)	1316 – 13 November 1386 (aged 70)	al-Wathiq I
(8)	al-Musta'sim أبو يحيى زكريا المستعصم بالله; Abū Yaḥyā Zakariyyāʾ al-Mustaʿṣim bi-'llāh	21 November 1386 – March 1389 (~3 years)	d. 1399	al-Wathiq I
(7)	al-Mutawakkil I أبو عبد الله محمد المتوكل على الله; Abū ʿAbd Allāh Muḥammad al-Mutawakkil ʿalā'llāh	March 1389 – 9 January 1406 (~17 years)	1339 – 18 January 1406 (aged 67)	al-Mu'tadid I
10	al-Musta'in أبو الفضل العباس المستعين بالله; Abū al-Faḍl al-ʿAbbās al-Mustaʿīn bi-'llāh	22 January 1406 – 9 March 1414 (~8 years)	1390 – 16 March 1430 (aged 40)	al-Mutawakkil I
11	al-Mu'tadid II أبو الفتح داود المعتضد بالله; Abū al-Fatḥ Dāwūd al-Muʿtaḍid bi-'llāh	9 March 1414 – 4 July 1441 (~27 years)	d. 4 July 1441	al-Mutawakkil I
12	al-Mustakfi II أبو الربيع سليمان المستكفي بالله; Abū al-Rabīʿ Sulaymān al-Mustakfī bi-llāh	4 July 1441 – 4 February 1451 (~10 years)	1388 – 4 February 1451 (aged 63)	al-Mutawakkil I
13	al-Qa'im أبو البقاء حمزة القائم بأمر الله; Abū al-Baqāʾ Ḥamza al-Qāʾim bi-ʾamr Allāh	7 February 1451 – 19 June 1455 (~4 years)	d. 28 August 1458	al-Mutawakkil I
14	al-Mustanjid أبو المحاسن يوسف المستنجد بالله; Abū al-Maḥāsin Yūsuf al-Mustanjid bi-'llāh	19 June 1455 – 17 April 1479 (~24 years)	1396 – 17 April 1479 (aged 40)	al-Mutawakkil I
15	al-Mutawakkil II أبو العز عبد العزيز المتوكل على الله; Abū al-ʿIzz ʿAbd al-ʿAzīz al-Mutawakkil ʿalā'llāh	19 April 1479 – August 1497 (~18 years)	1413 – August 1497 (aged 84)	Ya'qub ibn al-Mutawakkil I; Hajj Malak bint Muqbil
16	al-Mustamsik أبو الصبر يعقوب المستمسك بالله; Abū al-Ṣabr Yaʿqūb al-Mustamsik bi-'llāh	24 September 1497 – 28 November 1508 (~11 years)	1441 – 29 March 1521 (aged 80)	al-Mutawakkil II; Amna bint al-Mustakfi II
17	al-Mutawakkil III أبو هارون محمد المتوكل على الله; Abū Hārūn Muḥammad al-Mutawakkil ʿalā'llāh	28 November 1508 – 24 August 1516 (~8 years)	d. 10 November 1543	al-Mustamsik
(16)	al-Mustamsik أبو الصبر يعقوب المستمسك بالله; Abū al-Ṣabr Yaʿqūb al-Mustamsik bi-'llāh	24 October 1516 – 26 January 1517 (~3 months)	1441 – 29 March 1521 (aged 80)	al-Mutawakkil II
(17)	al-Mutawakkil III أبو هارون محمد المتوكل على الله; Abū Hārūn Muḥammad al-Mutawakkil ʿalā'llāh	1517 (Note: The legend of al-Mutawakkil III formally surrendering the title to Selim I is considered by historians to be apocryphal. It emerged in the 1780s, likely to counter Russian claims of "protecting" Ottoman Christians by asserting spiritual authority over Muslims in newly conquered Russian territories. As chroniclers of his era continued identifying al-Mutawakkil III as caliph, the already nominal Abbasid caliphate is suggested to have simply faded away, with al-Mutawakkil III using the title till his death.)	d. 10 November 1543	al-Mustamsik

== Ottoman Caliphate (1517–1924) ==
The head of the Ottoman dynasty was just entitled Sultan originally, but soon it started accumulating titles assumed from subjected peoples. Murad I (reigned 1362–1389) was the first Ottoman claimant to the title of Caliph; he claimed the title after conquering Edirne.

No.	Portrait	Name	Tughra	Reign	Lifespan	Parents
1		Selim I سليم أول; Selim-i evvel		26 January 1517 – 22 September 1520 (~3 years)	10 October 1470 – 22 September 1520 (aged 49)	Bayezid II; Gülbahar Hatun
2		Suleiman I سليمان أول; Süleyman-ı evvel		30 September 1520 – 6 September 1566 (~46 years)	6 November 1494 – 6 September 1566 (aged 71)	Selim I; Hafsa Sultan
3		Selim II سليم ثانى; Selim-i sânî		29 September 1566 – 21 December 1574 (~8 years)	28 May 1524 – 15 December 1574 (aged 50)	Suleiman I; Hürrem Sultan
4		Murad III مراد ثالث; Murad-ı sâlis		22 December 1574 – 16 January 1595 (~20 years)	4 July 1546 – 16 January 1595 (aged 48)	Selim II; Nurbanu Sultan
5		Mehmed III محمد ثالث; Mehmed-i sâlis		27 January 1595 – 20 or 21 December 1603 (~9 years)	26 May 1566 – 22 December 1603 (aged 37)	Murad III; Safiye Sultan
6		Ahmed I احمد أول; Ahmed-i evvel		21 December 1603 – 22 November 1617 (~14 years)	18 April 1590 – 22 November 1617 (aged 27)	Mehmed III; Handan Sultan
7		Mustafa I مصطفى أول; Mustafa-yı evvel		22 November 1617 – 26 February 1618 (~3 months)	24 June 1591 – 20 January 1639 (aged 47)	Mehmed III; Halime Sultan
8		Osman II عثمان ثانى; Osman-ı sânî		26 February 1618 – 19 May 1622 (~4 years)	3 November 1604 – 20 May 1622 (aged 17)	Ahmed I; Mahfiruz Hatun
(7)		Mustafa I مصطفى أول; Mustafa-yı evvel		20 May 1622 – 10 September 1623 (~1 year)	24 June 1591 – 20 January 1639 (aged 47)	Mehmed III; Halime Sultan
9		Murad IV مراد رابع; Murad-ı râbi'		10 September 1623 – 8 or 9 February 1640 (~16 years)	27 July 1612 – 8 February 1640 (aged 27)	Ahmed I; Kösem Sultan
10		Ibrahim ابراهيم; İbrahim		9 February 1640 – 8 August 1648 (~8 years)	5 November 1615 – 18 August 1648 (aged 32)	Ahmed I; Kösem Sultan
11		Mehmed IV محمد رابع; Mehmed-i râbi'		8 August 1648 – 8 November 1687 (~39 years)	2 January 1642 – 6 January 1693 (aged 51)	Ibrahim; Turhan Sultan
12		Suleiman II سليمان ثانى; Süleyman-ı sânî		8 November 1687 – 22 June 1691 (~4 years)	15 April 1642 – 22 June 1691 (aged 49)	Ibrahim; Aşub Sultan
13		Ahmed II احمد ثانى; Ahmed-i sânî		22 June 1691 – 6 February 1695 (~4 years)	25 February 1643 – 6 February 1695 (aged 51)	Ibrahim; Muazzez Sultan
14		Mustafa II مصطفى ثانى; Mustafa-yı sânî		6 February 1695 – 22 August 1703 (~9 years)	6 February 1664 – 31 December 1703 (aged 39)	Mehmed IV; Gülnuş Sultan
15		Ahmed III احمد ثالث; Ahmed-i sâlis		22 August 1703 – 1 or 2 October 1730 (~27 years)	30 December 1673 – 1 July 1736 (aged 62)	Mehmed IV; Gülnuş Sultan
16		Mahmud I محمود أول; Mahmud-ı evvel		2 October 1730 – 13 December 1754 (~24 years)	2 August 1696 – 13 December 1754 (aged 58)	Mustafa II; Saliha Sultan
17		Osman III عثمان ثالث; Osman-ı sâlis		13 December 1754 – 29 or 30 October 1757 (~3 years)	2 January 1699 – 30 October 1757 (aged 58)	Mustafa II; Şehsuvar Sultan
18		Mustafa III مصطفى ثالث; Mustafa-yı sâlis		30 October 1757 – 21 January 1774 (~16 years)	28 January 1717 – 21 January 1774 (aged 56)	Ahmed III; Mihrişah Kadın
19		Abdul Hamid I عبد الحميد أول; Abdülhamid-i evvel		21 January 1774 – 6 or 7 April 1789 (~15 years)	20 March 1725 – 7 April 1789 (aged 64)	Ahmed III; Şermi Kadın
20		Selim III سليم ثالث; Selim-i sâlis		7 April 1789 – 29 May 1807 (~18 years)	24 December 1761 – 28 July 1808 (aged 46)	Mustafa III; Mihrişah Sultan
21		Mustafa IV مصطفى رابع; Mustafa-yı râbi'		29 May 1807 – 28 July 1808 (~1 year)	8 September 1779 – 16 November 1808 (aged 29)	Abdul Hamid I; Sineperver Sultan
22		Mahmud II محمود ثانى; Mahmud-ı sânî		28 July 1808 – 1 July 1839 (~31 years)	20 July 1785 – 1 July 1839 (aged 53)	Abdul Hamid I; Nakşidil Sultan
23		Abdulmejid I عبد المجيد أول; Abdülmecid-i evvel		1 July 1839 – 25 June 1861 (~22 years)	25 April 1823 – 25 June 1861 (aged 38)	Mahmud II; Bezmiâlem Sultan
24		Abdulaziz عبد العزيز; Abdülaziz		25 June 1861 – 30 May 1876 (~15 years)	9 February 1830 – 4 June 1876 (aged 46)	Mahmud II; Pertevniyal Sultan
25		Murad V مراد خامس; Murad-ı hâmis		30 May 1876 – 31 August 1876 (~3 months)	21 September 1840 – 29 August 1904 (aged 63)	Abdulmejid I; Şevkefza Kadın
26		Abdul Hamid II عبد الحميد ثانى; Abdülhamid-i sânî		31 August 1876 – 27 April 1909 (~33 years)	21 September 1842 – 10 February 1918 (aged 75)	Abdulmejid I; Tirimüjgan Kadın
27		Mehmed V محمد خامس; Mehmed-i hâmis		27 April 1909 – 3 July 1918 (~9 years)	2 November 1844 – 3 July 1918 (aged 73)	Abdulmejid I; Gülcemal Kadın
28		Mehmed VI محمد سادس; Mehmed-i sâdis		4 July 1918 – 19 November 1922 (~4 years)	14 January 1861 – 16 May 1926 (aged 65)	Abdulmejid I; Gülüstü Hanım
29		Abdulmejid II عبد المجيد ثانى; Abdülmecid-i sânî	— (Note: Abdulmejid II, the last Ottoman Caliph, lacked a tughra of his own, since he did not serve as head of state (that position being held by Mustafa Kemal, President of the newly founded Republic of Turkey) but as a religious and royal figurehead.)	19 November 1922 – 3 March 1924 (~1 year)	29 May 1868 – 23 August 1944 (aged 76)	Abdulaziz; Hayranidil Kadın

The Office of the Ottoman Caliphate was transferred to the Grand National Assembly of Turkey which dissolved the office on 3 March 1924, in keeping with the policies of secularism that were adopted in the early years of the Republic of Turkey by its President Mustafa Kemal Atatürk. After the abolition of the Caliphate, the Grand National Assembly of Turkey founded the Presidency of Religious Affairs as the new highest Islamic religious authority in the country.

== Other caliphates ==
=== Hasan ibn Ali's caliphate (661) ===
After Ali was killed, the governor of Syria Mu'awiya led his army toward Kufa, where Ali's son Hasan ibn Ali had been nominated as Ali's successor by his followers in Iraq. Mu'awiya successfully bribed Ubayd Allah ibn Abbas, the commander of Hasan's vanguard, to desert his post, and sent envoys to negotiate with Hasan. In return for a financial settlement, Hasan abdicated and Mu'awiya entered Kufa in July or September 661 and was recognized as caliph. This year is considered by a number of the early Muslim sources as 'the year of unity' and is generally regarded as the start of Mu'awiya's caliphate.

No.	Callipgraphic Name	Name	Reign	Life details	Parents
1		Hasan ibn Ali أبو محمد حسن المجتبى; Abū Muḥammad Ḥasan al-Mujtabā	28 January 661 – 10 August 661 (~7 months)	4 March 625 – 5 March 670 (aged 45)	Ali ibn Abi Talib; Fatimah bint Muhammad

=== Zubayrid caliphate (684–692) ===
Abd Allah ibn al-Zubayr, a grandson of the first caliph Abu Bakr and a nephew of Aisha, wife of Muhammad, led an uprising against the Umayyad Caliphate. After the death of caliph Yazid I, he was proclaimed caliph in Mecca, and subsequently ruled Hejaz for about nine years. He was eventually defeated and killed in Mecca in 692 after a six-month siege by Umayyad general Al-Hajjaj ibn Yusuf.

No.	Coin	Name	Reign	Life details	Parents
1		Abd Allah ibn al-Zubayr أبو بكر عبد الله ابن الزبير; Abū Bakr ʿAbd Allāh ibn al-Zubayr	November 683 – November 692 (~9 years)	May 624 – November 692 (aged 68)	Zubayr ibn al-Awwam; Asma bint Abi Bakr

=== Talib al-Haqq (747–748) ===
1. Talib al-Haqq, 745–748

=== Caliphate of Córdoba (929–1031) ===
(Not universally accepted; actual authority confined to Spain and parts of Maghreb)

1. Abd al-Rahman III al-Nasir, grandson of Abd Allah, emir of Cordoba, 929–961
2. Al-Hakam II al-Mustansir, son of Abd al-Rahman III, 961–976
3. Hisham II al-Mu'ayyad, son of al-Hakam II, 976–1009, 1010–1013
4. Muhammad II al-Mahdi, great-grandson of Abd al-Rahman III, 1009, 1010
5. Sulayman al-Musta'in, great-grandson of Abd al-Rahman III, 1009–1010, 1013–1016
6. Ali al-Nasir, descendant of Idris I, 1016–1018
7. Al-Qasim al-Ma'mun, brother of Ali, 1018–1021, 1023
8. Yahya al-Mu'tali, son of Ali, 1021–1023, 1025–1026
9. Abd al-Rahman IV al-Murtada, great-grandson of Abd al-Rahman III, 1018
10. Abd al-Rahman V al-Mustazhir, great-grandson of Abd al-Rahman III, 1023–1024
11. Muhammad III al-Musta'in, great-grandson of Abd al-Rahman III, 1024–1025
12. Hisham III al-Mu'tad, great-grandson of Abd al-Rahman III, 1027–1031

=== Almohad Caliphate (1145–1269) ===
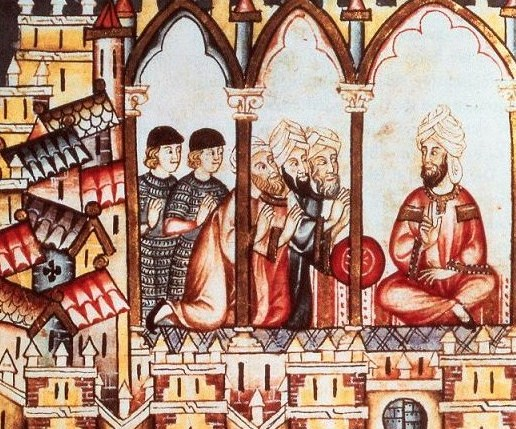
Castilian ambassadors meeting Abu Hafs Umar al-Murtaḍā, from the Cantigas de Santa Maria.

(Not widely accepted, actual dominions were parts of North Africa and Iberia)

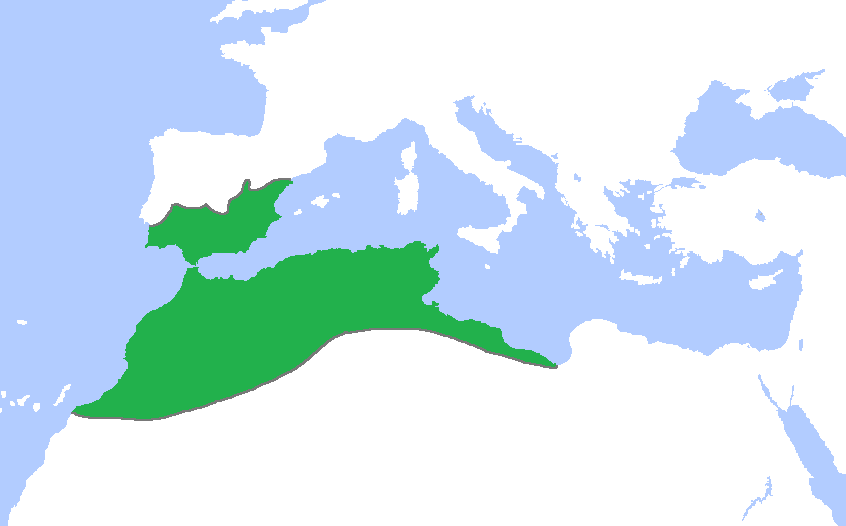
The Almohad Empire at its greatest extent (c. 1200)

1. Abd al-Mu'min, follower of Almohad founder Ibn Tumart, 1130–1163
2. Yusuf I, son of Abd al-Mu'min, 1163–1184
3. Ya'qub al-Mansur, son of Yusuf I, 1184–1199
4. Muhammad al-Nasir, son of Ya'qub, 1199–1213
5. Yusuf II al-Mustansir, son of Muhammad, 1213–1224
6. Abd al-Wahid I al-Makhlu, son of Yusuf I, 1224
7. Abdallah al-Adil, son of Ya'qub, 1224–1227
8. Yahya al-Mu'tasim, son of Muhammad, 1227–1229
9. Idris I al-Ma'mun, son of Ya'qub, 1229–1232
10. Abd al-Wahid II al-Rashid, son of Idris I, 1232–1242
11. Ali al-Said, son of Idris I, 1242–1248
12. Umar al-Murtada, son of Ishaq ibn Yusuf I, 1248–1266
13. Idris II al-Wathiq, son of Muhammad ibn Umar ibn Abd al-Mu'min, 1266–1269

=== Hafsid Caliphate (1249–1574) ===
The Hafsids claimed their descent from Rashidun caliph Omar. After the fall of Baghdad, Marinid sultan Abu Yusuf Yaqub and Sharif of Mecca Abu Numayy recognized the Hafsids in 1258 and 1259 respectively.

1. Muhammad I al-Mustansir, son of Yahya I, 1249–1277
2. Yahya II al-Wathiq, son of Muhammad I, 1277–1279
3. Ibrahim I, son of Yahya I, 1279–1284
4. Umar I al-Mustansir, son of Yahya I, 1284–1295
5. Muhammad II al-Muntasir, son of Yahya II, 1295–1309
6. Abu Bakr I ash-Shahid, son of Yahya I, 1309
7. Khalid I an-Nasr, great-grandson of Yahya I, 1309–1311
8. Abd al-Wahid Zakariya ibn al-Lihyani, 1311–1317
9. Abu Darba Muhammad al-Mustansir, son of Abd al-Wahid, 1317–1318
10. Abu Bakr II al-Mutawakkil, great-grandson of Yahya I, 1318–1346
11. Umar II, son of Abu Bakr II, 1346–1347
12. Ahmad I al-Mutawakkil, son of Abu Bakr II, 1350
13. Ibrahim II, son of Abu Bakr II, 1350–1369
14. Khalid II, son of Ibrahim II, 1369–1371
15. Ahmad II, son of Abu Bakr II, 1370–1394
16. Abd al-Aziz II al-Mutawakkil, son of Ahmad II, 1394–1434
17. Muhammad III al-Muntasir, 1434–1435
18. Uthman al-Mutawakkil, son of Muhammad ibn Abd al-Aziz II, 1435–1488
19. Yahya III, son of Ma'sud ibn Uthman, 1488–1489
20. Abd al-Mu'min, son of Ibrahim ibn Uthman, 1489–1490
21. Abu Yahya Zakariya, son of Yahya III, 1490–1494
22. Muhammad IV al-Mutawakkil, son of Hassan ibn Mas'ud ibn Uthman, 1494–1526
23. Muhammad V al-Hasan, son of Muhammad IV, 1526–1543
24. Ahmad III, son of Muhammad V, 1543–1569
25. Muhammad VI, son of Muhammad V, 1573–1574

=== Bornu and Songhai Empires (15th/16th century) ===
The Bornu Empire at its greatest extent (c. 1750)

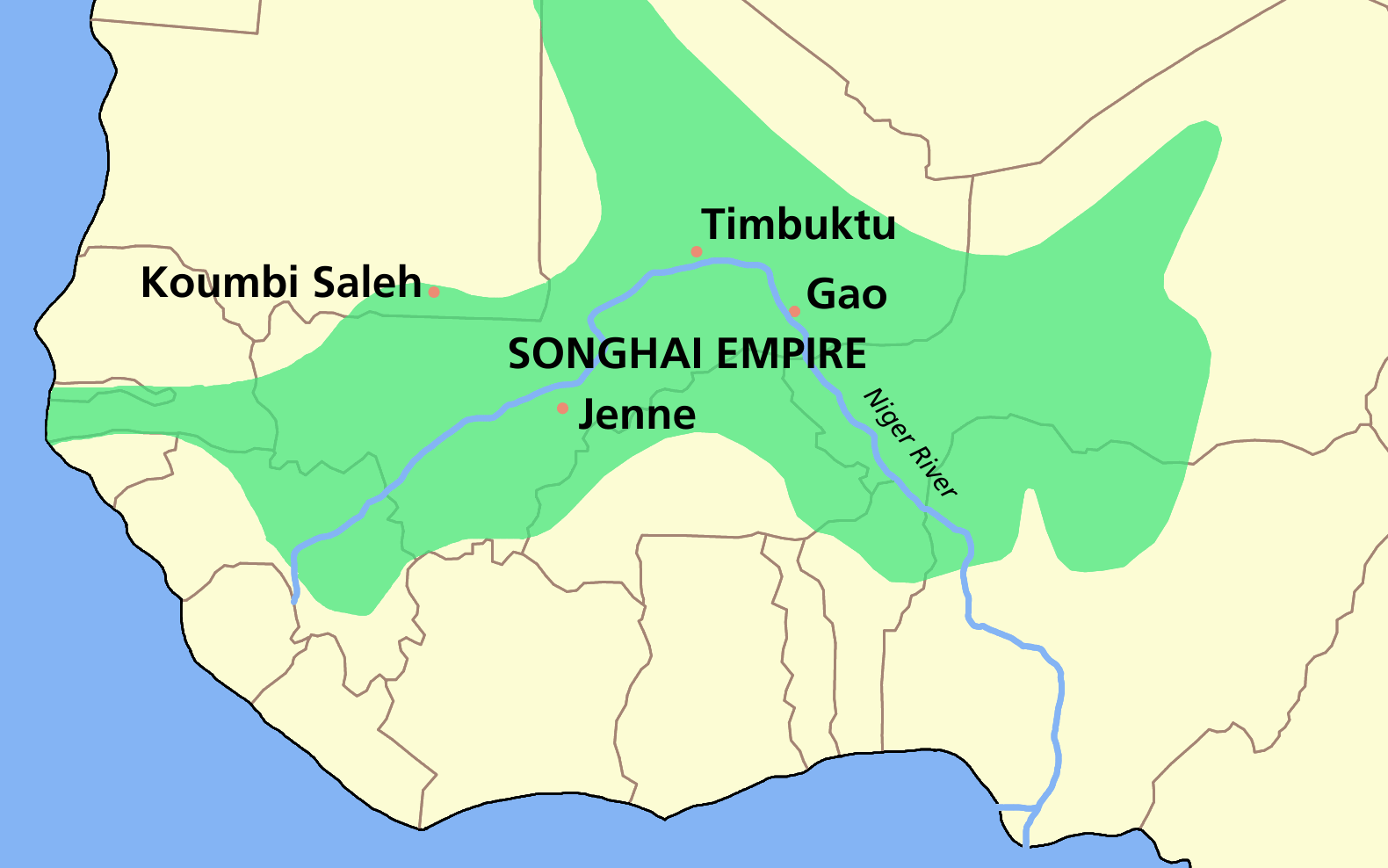
Songhai Empire at its greatest extent (c. 1500)

Several rulers of West Africa adopted the title of Caliph. Mai Ali Ghaji ibn Dunama was the first ruler of Bornu Empire to assume the title. Askia Mohammad I of Songhai Empire also assumed the title around the same time.

=== Indian caliphates (late medieval/early modern) ===
Despite the domination of South Asia by Muslim empires, kingdoms and sultanates, from the 12th century onwards, Islamic caliphates were not universally established across the Indian subcontinent. However, caliphates were established under the sharia-based reigns of Sunni emperors such as Alauddin Khalji, the Mughal Empire's Aurangzeb, and Mysore's rulers Hyder Ali and Tipu Sultan.

=== Sokoto Caliphate (1804–1903) ===
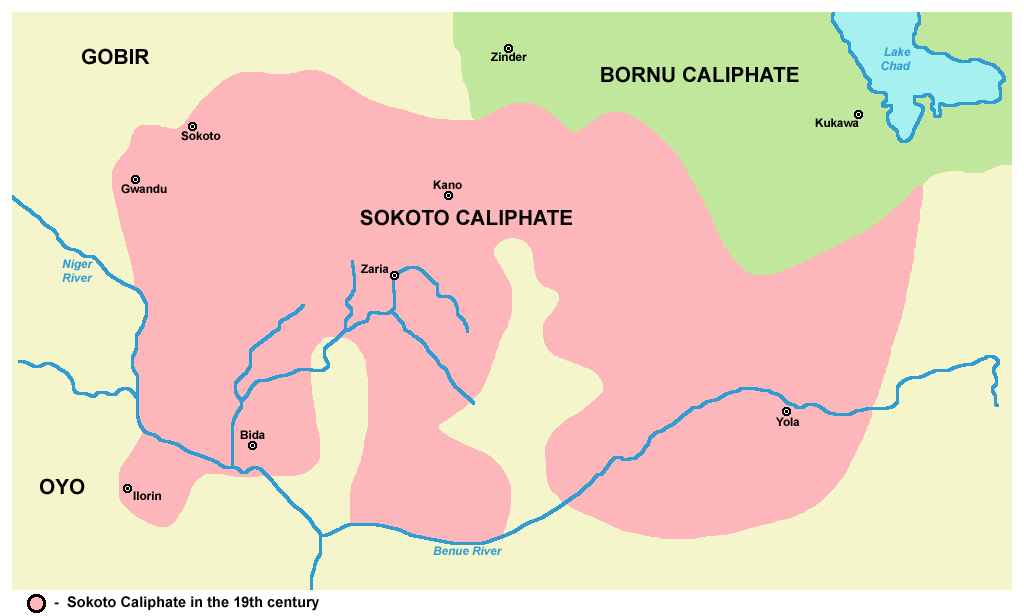
The Sokoto Caliphate (pink) at its greatest extent (c. 1800)

(Not widely accepted, actual dominions were parts of West Africa)

Established by Tariqa Islamic scholar and religious leader Usman dan Fodio through the Fulani War (alternatively known as the Fulani Jihad), which sought to reduce the influence of pre-Islamic religious practices and spread a more vigorous form of Islam through the auspices of a Caliphate.

=== Ahmadiyya Caliphate (1908–present) ===
Ahmadiyya Muslim Community Flag

The Khalīfatul Masīh (Arabic: خليفة المسيح; Urdu: خلیفہ المسیح; English: Successor of the Messiah), sometimes simply referred to as Khalifah (i.e. Caliph, successor), is the elected spiritual and organizational leader of the Ahmadiyya Muslim Community, a minority community with followers in different countries, and is the successor of Mirza Ghulam Ahmad, whom the community regards as Mahdi and Messiah of Islam.The current Caliph of the Ahmadiyya community is Mirza Masroor Ahmad.

Portrait	Name	Born	Reigned from	Died	Relation to presecessor(s)
	Hakeem Noor-ud-Din	1834	1914	1914	Close companion of Mirza Ghulam Ahmad, he sent the first Ahmadiyya Muslim missionaries to the UK, and successfully dealt with internal dissensions within the community.
	Mirza Basheer-ud-Din Mahmood Ahmad	1889	1914	1965	Son of Mirza Ghulam Ahmad.
	Mirza Nasir Ahmad	1909	1965	1982	Son of Mirza Basheer-ud-Din Mahmood Ahmad.
	Mirza Tahir Ahmad	1928	1982	2003	Son of Mirza Basheer-ud-Din Mahmood Ahmad and half-brother of Mirza Nasir Ahmad.
	Mirza Masroor Ahmad	1950	2003		Great-grandson of Mirza Ghulam Ahmad.

=== Sharifian Caliphate (1924–1925) ===
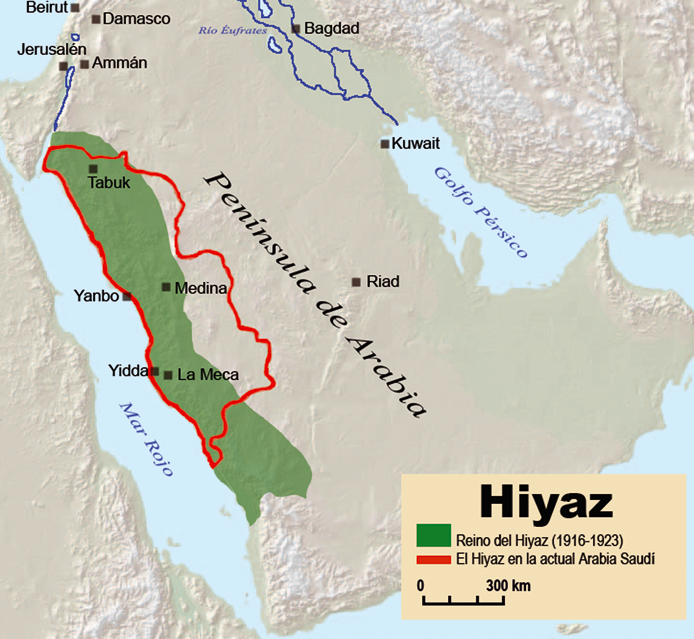
Map with the kingdom in green and the current region in red.

An attempt at restoring the caliphal office and style following the abolition of the Ottoman Caliphate was made by Hussein bin Ali, King of Hejaz and Sharif of Mecca, who assumed both on 11 March 1924 and held them until 3 October 1924, when he passed the kingship to his son Ali bin Hussein, who did not adopted the caliphal office and style. Like the Fatimid caliphs, he was a descendant of Muhammad through a grandson of Hasan ibn Ali. Hussein's claim for caliphate was not accepted by the Wahhabi and Salafi movements, and in 1925 he was driven from Hejaz by the forces of Ibn Saud as an outcome of the Second Saudi-Hashemite War. He continued to use the title of caliph during his remaining life in exile, until his death in 1931.

In October 1924, facing defeat by Ibn Saud, he abdicated and was succeeded as king by his eldest son Ali bin Hussein. After Hejaz was subsequently completely conquered by the Ibn Saud-Wahhabi armies of the Ikhwan, on 23 December 1925, Hussein surrendered to the Saudis, bringing the Kingdom of Hejaz, the Sharifate of Mecca and the Sharifian Caliphate to an end. (Note: The legitimacy of his Caliphate is disputed; however, the date of end can be assigned to his loss of the Haramayn, in 1925 or to his death, in 1931. Both interpretations can be found in sources.)

== Bibliography ==
- Bobrick, Benson (2012). The Caliph's Splendor: Islam and the West in the Golden Age of Baghdad. Simon & Schuster. ISBN 978-1416567622.
- Bosworth, C. E., ed. (1987). The History of al-Ṭabarī, Volume XXXII: The Reunification of the ʿAbbāsid Caliphate: The Caliphate of al-Maʾmūn, A.D. 813–33/A.H. 198–213. SUNY Series in Near Eastern Studies. Albany, New York: State University of New York Press. ISBN 978-0-88706-058-8.
- Bosworth, C.E. (1993). "Al-Muntasir". In Bosworth, C. E.; van Donzel, E.; Heinrichs, W. P. & Pellat, Ch. (eds.). The Encyclopaedia of Islam, Second Edition. Volume VII: Mif–Naz. Leiden: E. J. Brill. ISBN 978-90-04-09419-2.
- Bosworth, Clifford Edmund (2004) [1996]. The New Islamic Dynasties: A Chronological and Genealogical Manual. New Edinburgh Islamic Surveys (2nd ed.). Edinburgh University Press. ISBN 978-0-7486-2137-8. OCLC 56639413.
- Donner, Fred M. (2012) [2010]. Muhammad and the Believers, at the Origins of Islam. Cambridge, Massachusetts: Harvard University Press. ISBN 978-0-674-05097-6.
- Hinds, Martin (1993). "Muʿāwiya I b. Abī Sufyān". In Bosworth, C. E.; van Donzel, E.; Heinrichs, W. P. & Pellat, Ch. (eds.). The Encyclopaedia of Islam, Second Edition. Volume VII: Mif–Naz. Leiden: E. J. Brill. pp. 263–268. ISBN 978-90-04-09419-2.
- Houtsma, M. Th.; Wensinck, A. J. (1993). E.J. Brill's First Encyclopaedia of Islam 1913–1936. Vol. IX (Reprint ed.). Leiden: BRILL. ISBN 978-90-04-09796-4.
- Kennedy, Hugh (2006). When Baghdad Ruled the Muslim World: The Rise and Fall of Islam's Greatest Dynasty. Cambridge, MA: Da Capo Press. ISBN 978-0-306814808.
- Lammens, H. & Blankinship, Kh. Y. (2002). "Yazīd (II) b. ʿAbd al-Malik". In Bearman, P. J.; Bianquis, Th.; Bosworth, C. E.; van Donzel, E. & Heinrichs, W. P. (eds.). The Encyclopaedia of Islam, Second Edition. Volume XI: W–Z. Leiden: E. J. Brill. p. 311. ISBN 978-90-04-12756-2.
- Lane-Poole, Stanley (1894). The Mohammedan Dynasties: Chronological and Genealogical Tables with Historical Introductions. Westminster: Archibald Constable and Company. OCLC 1199708.
- Madelung, Wilferd (1997). The Succession to Muhammad: A Study of the Early Caliphate. Cambridge: Cambridge University Press. ISBN 0-521-56181-7.
- Marsham, Andrew (2013). "The Architecture of Allegiance in Early Islamic Late Antiquity: The Accession of Mu'awiya in Jerusalem, ca. 661 CE". In Beihammer, Alexander; Constantinou, Stavroula; Parani, Maria (eds.). Court Ceremonies and Rituals of Power in Byzantium and the Medieval Mediterranean. Leiden and Boston: Brill. pp. 87–114. ISBN 978-90-04-25686-6.
- Powers, David S., ed. (1989). The History of al-Ṭabarī, Volume XXIV: The Empire in Transition: The Caliphates of Sulaymān, ʿUmar, and Yazīd, A.D. 715–724/A.H. 96–105. SUNY Series in Near Eastern Studies. Albany, New York: State University of New York Press. ISBN 978-0-7914-0072-2.
- Wellhausen, Julius (1927). The Arab Kingdom and Its Fall. Translated by Margaret Graham Weir. Calcutta: University of Calcutta.
- Zetterstéen, K. V. (1987). "al-Muʿtaḍid Bi'llāh". In Houtsma, Martijn Theodoor (ed.). E.J. Brill's First Encyclopaedia of Islam, 1913–1936, Volume VI: Morocco–Ruzzik. Leiden: Brill. p. 777. ISBN 978-90-04-08265-6.
