= Battle of Fajj al-Naam =

- Part of Hafsid-Arab conflict
Date	1318
Location	Fajj al-Naam, between Tunis and Kairouan
Result	Hafsid Victory

Belligerents
Hafsid dynasty	Arab rebels

Commanders and leaders
Abu Yahya Abu Bakr II	Abu Darba Muhammad al-Mustansir

Strength
Unknown	Unknown

Casualties and losses
Unknown	Unknown

The Battle of Fajj al-Naam took place in 1318 and was fought between the forces of the Hafsid caliph Abu Yahya Abu Bakr II and the Arab rebel Abu Darba.

== Background ==
During the period from 1311 to 1318, a civil war took place between two rival claimants to the Hafsid throne: Abd al-Wahid Zakariya ibn al-Lihyani and Abu Yahya Abu Bakr II. To gain the upper hand in the conflict, Abd al-Wahid financed the Arab tribes of Alqa and Dhiab to fight against Abu Yahya Abu Bakr II near Kairouan.

== Battle ==
During the battle in 1318, Abu Darba’s troops were defeated, and his soldiers were plundered and killed, forcing Abu Darba to flee to Mahdia.

== Aftermath ==
The end of this battle marked the reunification of the Hafsid territories throughout Ifriqiya, until the invasion of the Marinids.

== Sources ==
- Tawib, Abdul Qader (2021). الضرائب والرسوم في المغرب الإسلامي في ظل الموحدين والإمارات الأخرى (in Arabic). Oran University.
- Ibn Khaldoun, Yahya (1377). Kitab al-Ibar vol.V (in Arabic).
- André Julien, Charles (1940). La Bérberie ortientale sous les Hafsides (PDF) (in French).
