= Banu Yamlul revolt =

Banu Yamlul Revolt
- Part of Hafsid-Arab conflict
Date	1343–1400
Location	Tozeur,Tunisia
Result	Hafsid Victory

Belligerents
Hafsid dynasty	Banu Yamlul

Commanders and leaders
Abu Yahya Abu Bakr II; Abu al-Abbas Ahmad II; Abu Faris Abd al-Aziz II	Mohammed ibn Yamlul; Yahya ibn Yamlul; Abu Yahya ibn Yamlul (surrendered); Ibn Munzi (surrendered)

Strength
Unknown	Unknown

Casualties and losses
Unknown	Heavy

The revolts of the Banu Yamlul took place following the weakening of the Hafsid dynasty in the 13th century at Tozeur, and opposed the three successive leaders of the insurgents—Mohamed ibn Yamlul, Yahya ibn Yamlul, and Abu Yahya ibn Yamlul—to the three Hafsid caliphs: Abu Yahya Abu Bakr II, Abu al-Abbas Ahmad II, and Abu Faris Abd al-Aziz II. They ended with the reconquest of Tozeur and its surrounding areas in 1400.

== Background ==
According to Ibn Khaldun, the Banu Yamlul family was an Arab family descending from the Tanukh, originating from the Djerid. They were very powerful and wealthy, forming part of the Hafsid elite at Tozeur. Taking advantage of the weakening of the Hafsid dynasty in the 13th century, the Banu Yamlul, led by their chief Mohamed ibn Yamlul, proclaimed their independence and resisted the Hafsids for many years.

== Revolt ==
Throughout the resistance of Mohamed Ibn Yamlul, Tozeur maintained its independence, unlike other independent tribes that were subdued one by one by the sultan. However, after his death in 1344, his relatives fought among themselves, which destabilized Tozeur. The sultanate took advantage of this succession crisis and captured the city, depriving the Banu Yamlul of their autonomy for the first time.

After being expelled from Tozeur, the Banu Yamlul took refuge in Biskra. Their leader, Yahya ibn Yamlul, accompanied by the city’s governor Ibn Munzi, attempted to provoke an invasion of Ifriqiya by Abu Hammu Musa II, then governor of Tlemcen, but the attempt failed. He later died and was succeeded by his son, Abu Yahya ibn Yamlul. His son, accompanied by Ibn Munzi, governor of the Zab, decided to launch a reconquest expedition against Tozeur, but it failed. The Hafsid sultan Abu al-Abbas Ahmad II, then marched on Biskra, where Ibn Munzi and Abu Yahya ibn Yamlul capitulated in 1381.

After the death of Abu al-Abbas Ahmad II, the Djerid fell into a war of succession between the two sons of the sultan, Al-Mustansir and Abu Zakariya. The Banu Yamlul, still led by Abu Yahya ibn Yamlul, took advantage of this disorder to reassert their sovereignty over Tozeur.

The sultan, Abu Faris Abd al-Aziz II, marched on Tozeur, captured Abu Yahya ibn Yamlul, and had him tortured in April 1400. He then definitively retook Tozeur, an event which brought an end to the revolts of the Banu Yamlul.
