= Siege of Gafsa =

- Part of Hafsid–arab war, Banu Yamlul revolt
Date	1344
Location	Gafsa
Result	Hafsid victory

Belligerents
Hafsid dynasty	Banu Yamlul

Commanders and leaders
Abu Yahya Abu Bakr II	Abu Bakr ibn Yamlul; Mohamed-ed-Tammoudi; Yemloul †

Strength
Unknown	Unknown

Casualties and losses
Unknown	Unknown

The Siege of Gafsa took place in 1344 during the revolt of the Banu Yamlul and formed part of the conflicts between independent Arab tribes and the Hafsid Dynasty. It ended with the defeat of the Banu Yamlul.

== Background ==
The Banu Yamlul were a rebellious tribe that repeatedly attempted to declare independence from the Hafsid Dynasty, notably during the Banu Yamlul revolt. Outraged by the behavior of the Yamlul in power, the Emir of Tozeur called upon the sultan to march against the Banu Yamlul.

== Siege ==
The sultan set out in 1344 towards Gafsa and advanced on the city with little resistance. The leader, Abu Bakr ben Yamloul, surrendered to the sultan, while his secretary, Mohammed ed-Tammoudi, fled toward Biskra, where another dissident leader, Ibn Monzi, was located.

== Aftermath ==
The city was almost entirely destroyed; many palm trees were cut down, along with numerous other trees. Additionally, the brother of Abu Bakr, Yemloul, was handed over to the sultan and executed at the end of the siege. After suppressing the revolt of the Yamlul, the sultan went on to retake Gabes from the Banu Makki and reunify the entire south of Tunisia.
