= Siege of Algiers (1274) =

1274 siege during the Hafsid conquest of Algiers

Date	1274
Location	Algiers, present-day Algeria
Result	Hafsid victory
Territorial changes	Algiers incorporated into the Hafsid Sultanate

Belligerents
Algiers	Hafsid dynasty

Commanders and leaders
Shaykhs of Algiers (POW)	Abu al-Hasan ibn Yasin; Abu al-Abbas ibn Abi al-Alam

Strength
Unknown	Unknown

Casualties and losses
Massacre of the inhabitants	Unknown

The siege of Algiers took place in 1274 during the reign of Sultan Muhammad I al-Mustansir. The siege pitted the forces of the rebel city of Algiers, which had revolted against the Hafsid sultan, against the Hafsid forces. The siege ended with the conquest of the city by the Hafsid forces.

== Background ==
The city of Algiers rose in revolt following the death of the first Hafsid sultan, Abu Zakariya Yahya. The revolt led to several military expeditions, two of which were particularly notable. The first in 1271 was personally led by Sultan Muhammad I al-Mustansir and ended in failure. The second in 1273 was led by Abu Hilal, the governor of Béjaïa, but also ended unsuccessfully.

Determined to avoid a third failure, the Hafsid sultan decided to reinforce the expedition by doubling the size of his forces and deploying the Hafsid fleet to blockade the city.

== Siege ==
In 1274, the sultan dispatched an army commanded by Abu al-Hasan ibn Yasin and Abu al-Abbas ibn Abi al-Alam. The army besieged and sacked the city. Its inhabitants were massacred, while the shaykhs who governed the city were taken captive and brought to Tunis.

== Aftermath ==
The city came under the direct control of the sultan, who did not appoint a governor, thereby establishing permanent Hafsid control over Algiers and allowing the sultanate to compete directly with its rival, Yaghmurasen ibn Zyan, ruler of the Zayyanid dynasty. The shaykhs captured during the campaign were later released during the reign of Sultan Yahya II al-Wathiq.

== Sources ==
- Valérian, Dominique (2013). Bougie, port maghrébin, 1067–1510 (in French). École française de Rome.
- Brunchvig, Robert (1940). La Berbérie ortientale sous les Hafsides (PDF) (in French). Institut d’étude orientales d’Alger.
- Devoulx, Albert (1875). ALGER Etude archéologique et topographique sur-cette ville,aux époques romaine (Icosium), arabe (Éftézaïr Beni-Maz'renna) et turque (Êl-Djezair) (PDF) (in French).
