= Hafsid–Banu Ghaniya war =

- Part of Campaigns of Abu Zakariya Yahya
Date	1230–1237
Location	Miliana, Ouargla, Algeria, Tripoli, Libya
Result	Hafsid victory: end of the restoration of Almoravid power in the Maghreb

Belligerents
Banu Ghaniya	Hafsid dynasty

Commanders and leaders
Yahya ibn Ishaq †	Abu Zakariya Yahya

Strength
Unknown	Unknown

Casualties and losses
Unknown	Unknown

The Hafsid–Banu Ghaniya was a military engagement fought in 1237 between the Hafsid forces, commanded by Caliph Abu Zakariya Yahya, and the Banu Ghaniya, led by their last leader, Yahya ibn Ghaniya. The war ended in a Hafsid victory and the death of Yahya ibn Ghaniya, marking the end of attempts to restore Almoravid rule in the Maghreb.

== Background ==
The Banu Ghaniya were the heirs to Almoravid power, and their struggle against the Almohad Caliphate lasted for several decades. Following the fall of the Almohads, the Banu Ghaniya launched multiple raids across the Maghreb and came into conflict notably with the Hafsids, who had emerged as the dominant regional power.

== war ==
Abu Zakariya Yahya went to war against the Banu Ghaniya immediately after declaring his independence and led several campaigns against Yahya ibn Ghaniya, notably in Tripoli, the Zab, and Ouargla. However, it was the campaign at Miliana, near the Chelif River, that brought the rebellion to an end with the death of Yahya ibn Ghaniya.

== Aftermath ==
Following the death of Yahya ibn Ghaniya, Abu Zakariya Yahya took his daughters into his care in Tunis. He provided for them and reportedly built a palace in the city known as the “Palace of Girls.”

== Sources ==
- Agabi, C. (1998). « Ghaniya » (in French). Encyclopédie Berbère.
- Aillet, Cyrille (2018). L’ibadisme dans les sociétés de l’Islam médiéval (in French).
- Dhina, Atallah (2000). « Hafsides » (in French). Encyclopédie Berbère.
- Salem Baadj, Amar (2015). Saladin, the Almohads and the Banū Ghāniya: The Contest for North Africa (12th and 13th Centuries). Brill.
