= Ifriqiya =

Historic region of Northern Africa

Coordinates: 35°00′N 7°00′E

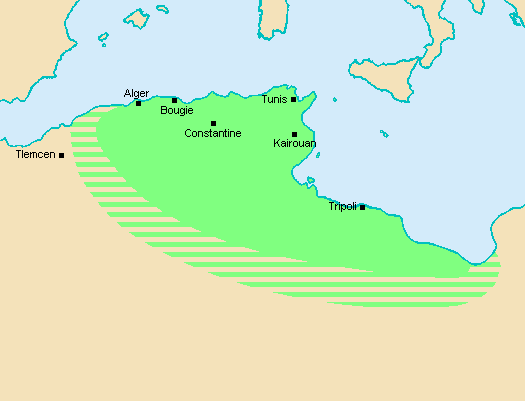
Ifriqiya during the Zirid dynasty c.1000CE

Ifriqiya (Arabic: إفريقية, romanized: Ifrīqiya, lit. 'Africa') was a medieval historical region comprising today's Tunisia, Constantinois (roughly eastern Algeria), and Tripolitania (roughly western Libya), particularly the region between the sea and the edges of the Sahara. It included all of what had previously been the Byzantine province of Africa Proconsularis and extended beyond it, but did not include the Mauretanias.

Ifriqiya is bordered to the west by the Central Maghreb, with which the borders are fluid depending on the chroniclers and the era. For most of its early history, the capital of Ifriqiya was Qayrawan (Kairouan), but in some periods it moved to Mahdiya (Mahdia) and later it remained at Tunis.

== Etymology ==
The name Ifriqiya was an Arabic derivation from Latin Africa. Some historical Arabic sources attributed the name to more legendary etymologies, such as being derived from a king of Yemen named Ifriqis or Ifriqish, who purportedly conquered the Maghreb in ancient times, or to a son of Abraham named Ifriq.

== Definition ==
The boundaries of what was known as Ifriqiya were not precise and changed between authors or historical periods. The Mediterranean Sea and the border areas of the Sahara were normally the northern and southern boundaries, respectively. The eastern boundary was typically between Tripolitania (western Libya) and Cyrenaica (eastern Libya), as the latter was attached administratively to Egypt in the early Islamic period. The western boundary was more variable, due mainly to the changing political borders over time. Some writers, like al-Bakri, considered Ifriqiya to be nearly equivalent to all of the Maghreb up to present-day Morocco, but most of them distinguished it from the central Maghreb and placed its boundary in northeastern Algeria, near places such as Béjaïa, Miliana, or Dellys.

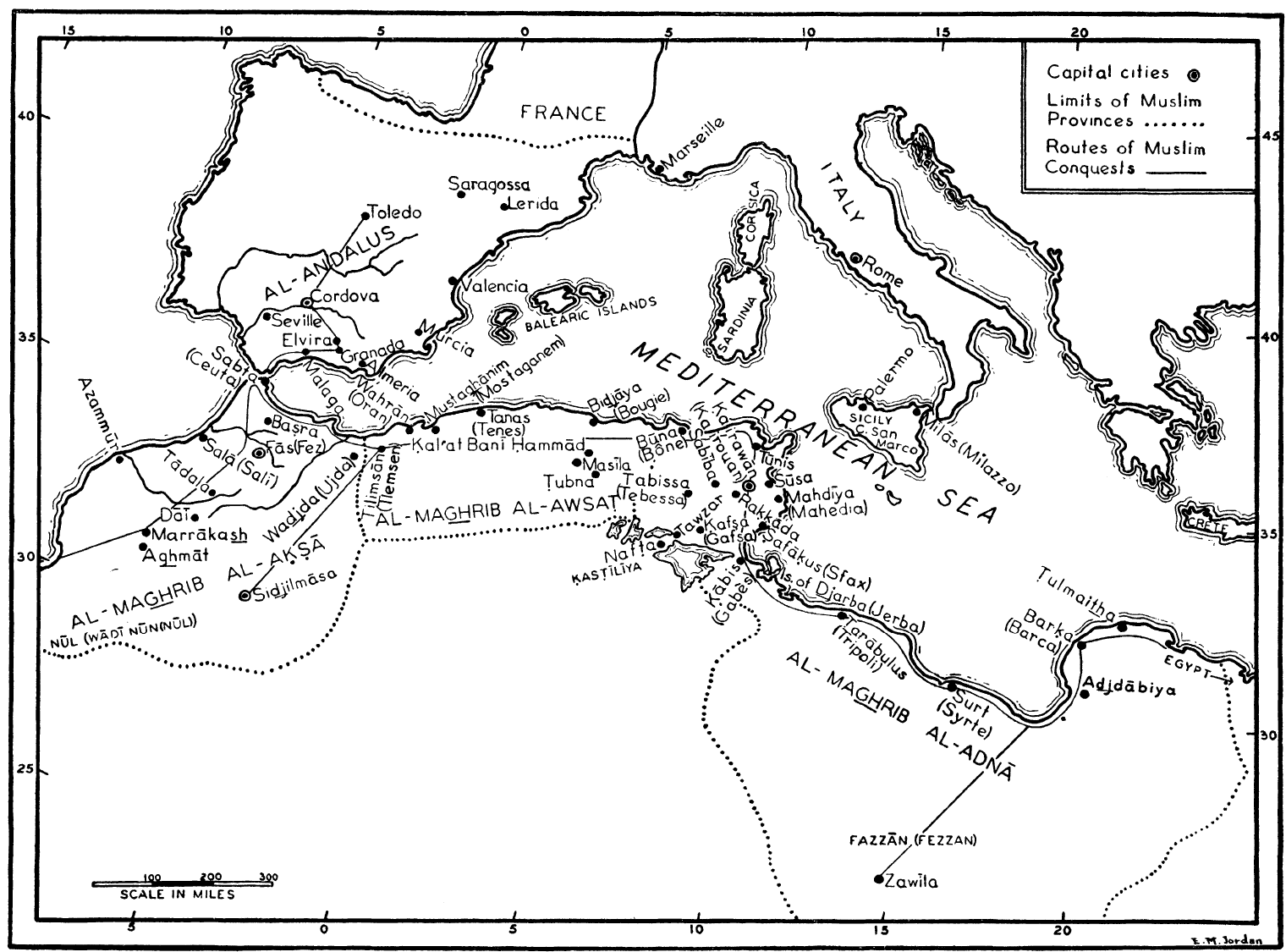
Map showing a typical tripartition of the Maghreb in medieval times. Al-Maghrib al-Adna overlaps with what is typically considered Ifriqiya.

Generally, Arabic writers came to split the wider Maghreb into three parts: the Maghrib al-Aqsa (the "Far West") corresponding roughly to present-day Morocco, the Maghrib al-Awsat (the "Middle West") corresponding generally to northern Algeria, and Ifriqiya. The eastern Maghreb was also known as the Maghrib al-Adna (the "Near West"), which encompassed more generally present-day Tunisia and northern Libya.

== History ==
The province of Ifriqiya was created in 703 CE when the Umayyads seized North Africa from the Byzantine Empire. Although Islam existed throughout the province, there was still considerable religious tension and conflict between the invading Arabs and the native Berbers. The beliefs and perceptions of people also shifted from area to area. This contrast was at its greatest between coastal cities and villages. Muslim ownership of Ifriqiya changed hands numerous times in its history with the collapse of the Umayyads paving the way for the Aghlabids, who acted as agents of the Abbasids in Baghdad.

They were then overthrown by the Fatimids in 909, when they lost their capital of Raqqada and the Fatimids went on to control all of Ifriqiya in 969, when they took control of Egypt. The Fatimids slowly lost control over Ifriqiya as their regents, the Zirids, became more and more autonomous until the mid-11th century when they fully separated.

Religious divisions paved the way for the Almohads to take over western Ifriqiya (Maghreb) in 1147 and all of Ifriqiya by 1160. This empire was to last until the early 13th century where it was then replaced by the Hafsids, an influential clan that boasted many of Ifriqiya's governors. The Hafsids in 1229 declared their independence from the Almohads and organised themselves under Abu Zakariya, who built the Hafsid empire around its new capital, Tunis.

Records of Arabic oral traditions imply that the Muslims first migrated to Africa feeling persecuted in their Arab homeland. However, Muslim military incursions into Africa began around seven years after the death of the Islamic Prophet Muhammad in 632. This campaign into Africa was led by the General Amr ibn al-As and Muslim control of Africa rapidly spread after the initial seizure of Alexandria.

Islam slowly took root in the East African coast due to cross-cultural links established between Muslim traders and the natives of the African coast. The political situation in Islamic Africa was like any other, filled with a chaotic and constant power struggle between movements and dynasties. A key factor in the success of any hopeful party was securing the wealth to fund a push for dominance. One source of great wealth was the lucrative gold-mining areas of Sub-Saharan Africa. The existence of these gold mines made expansion into Africa very worthwhile. The Muslim Empires pushed for influence and control of both the Northern and Southern parts of Africa. By the end of the 11th century, Islam had firmly established itself along the Mediterranean. Like the Europeans, Muslims felt the brutal effects of the Black Death in the 14th century when it arrived in Western Africa (Maghreb) through Europe. Maghreb and Ifriqiya were largely under the rule of the Ottoman Empire between the 16th and 18th centuries. Around the end of the 19th century, Islam accounted for 1/3rd of the religious population of Africa.

== List of rulers ==
=== Conquest phase ===
- Cyrenaica and Tripolitana conquered in 643 by Amr ibn al-As, organised as new province with regional capital at Barqa; first governors uncertain.
- Mu'awiya ibn Hudayj, c.665–666 — ruled from Barqa
- Uqba ibn Nafi, 666–674 — conquered south Tunisia (Byzacena), founded Kairouan (670)
- Abu al-Muhajir Dinar, 674–681
- Uqba ibn Nafi, (restored), 681–683 — led cavalcade to Morocco, ostensibly brought the entire Maghreb under submission.
- Uqba killed. Arabs expelled from Byzacena, which was then occupied by Awraba Berber chieftain Kusaila, 683–686.
- Zuhayr ibn Qays, 683–689 — initially only Barqa, retook Byzacena in 686.
- Zuhayr killed. Berbers under Kahina retake Byzacena in 689. No clear Arab governor, 689–92
- Hassan ibn al-Nu'man al-Ghassani, 692–703 — initially only Barqa. Captured Carthage in 695 (lost again), then again in 698 (final). Permanent conquest of Ifriqiya, organised as a new province, separately from Egypt, directly under the Umayyad Caliph, with capital at Kairouan.

=== Umayyad Governors of Ifriqiya ===
- Musa ibn Nusair al-Lakhmi, 703–715
- (During conquest of Spain, Abd Allah ibn Musa was regent in Kairouan, while Musa was in al-Andalus, 712–715)
- Muhammad ibn Yazid, 715–718
- Ismail ibn Abd Allah ibn Abi al-Muhajir, 718–720
- Yazid ibn Abi Muslim, 720–721
- Muhammad ibn Yazid (restored), 721
- Bishr ibn Safwan al-Kalbi, 721–727
- Ubayda ibn Abd al-Rahman al-Sulami, 727–32
- Uqba ibn Qudama (temporary), 732–734
- Ubayd Allah ibn al-Habhab al-Mausili, 734–41. (Berber Revolt begins 740)
- Kulthum ibn Iyad al-Qushayri, 741
- Balj ibn Bishr al-Qushayri (de jure, in Córdoba) and Abd al-Rahman ibn Uqba al-Ghifari (de facto, in Kairouan), 741–42
- Handhala ibn Safwan al-Kalbi, 742–44

=== Fihrid Emirs of Ifriqiya ===
- (Independence from Caliphate: Berber statelets in Morocco; Fihrid coup d'état in Kairouan, 745)
- Abd al-Rahman ibn Habib al-Fihri, 745–755.
- Ilyas ibn Habib al-Fihri, 755
- Habib ibn Abd al-Rahman al-Fihri, 755–57

=== Kharijite rulers ===
- (Fihrid Ifriqiya conquered by Kharijite Berbers in 757 — Sufrite Warfajuma in Kairouan, Ibadite Nafusa in Tripoli)
- Asim ibn Jamil al-Warfajumi (Sufrite), 757–758
- Abd al-Malik ibn Abi 'l-Jad al-Waranjumi (Sufrite), 758
- (Ibadites of Tripoli depose Sufrites in Kairouan, 758)
- Abu al-Khattab Abd al-Ala ibn al-Samh al-Maafiri (Ibadite), 758–760
- Abd al-Rahman ibn Rustem al-Farissi (Ibadite), 760–62

=== Abbasid governors in Kairouan ===
- (Abbasid invasion of Ifriqiya; Ibadites reduced to Tahert and Nafusa, 762)

Appointed governors

- Muhammad ibn al-Ash'ath al-Khuza'i 762–765 (former Abbasid governor of Egypt)
- Isa ibn Yussuf al-Khurasani 765
- al-Aghlab ibn Salim at-Tamimi 765–766
- al-Hassan ibn Harb al-Kindi 766–767
- al-Mikhariq ibn Ghuffar 767–768

Muhallabids

- Umar ibn Hafs al-Muhallabi 768–771
- Habib ibn Habib al-Muhallabi 771
- Umar ibn Hafs al-Muhallabi 771
- Abu Hatim Yaqub ibn Labib al-Khariji 771–772 (Ibadi rebel)
- Yazid ibn Hatim al-Muhallabi 772–787
- Dawud ibn Yazid ibn Hatim al-Muhallabi 787
- Rawh ibn Hatim al-Muhallabi 787–791
- Nasr ibn Habib al-Muhallabi 791–793
- al-Fadl ibn Rawh ibn Hatim al-Muhallabi 793–795

Appointed governors

- Harthama ibn Ayan 795–797
- Muhammad ibn Muqatil al-Akki, 797–799
- Tammam ibn Tamim al-Tamimi 799–800
- Muhammad ibn Muqatil al-Akki 800

=== Aghlabid Emirs of Ifriqiya ===
- Ibrahim I ibn al-Aghlab ibn Salim (800–812)
- Abdallah I ibn Ibrahim (812–817)
- Ziyadat Allah I ibn Ibrahim(817–838)
- al-Aghlab Abu Iqal ibn Ibrahim (838–841)
- Abu 'l-Abbas Muhammad I ibn al-Aghlab Abi Affan (841–856)
- Ahmad ibn Muhammad (856–863)
- Ziyadat Allah II ibn Abil-Abbas (863)
- Abu 'l-Gharaniq Muhammad II ibn Ahmad (863–875)
- Abu Ishaq Ibrahim II ibn Ahmad (875–902)
- Abu 'l-Abbas Abdallah II ibn Ibrahim (902–903)
- Abu Mudhar Ziyadat Allah III ibn Abdallah (903–909)

=== Fatimid Caliphs in Ifriqiya ===
- Abū Muḥammad ʻAbdu l-Lāh (ʻUbaydu l-Lāh) al-Mahdī bi'llāh (909–934) — founder of the Fatimid dynasty
- Abū l-Qāsim Muḥammad al-Qā'im bi-Amr Allāh (934–946)
- Abū Ṭāhir Ismā'il al-Manṣūr bi-llāh (946–953)
- Abū Tamīm Ma'add al-Mu'izz li-Dīn Allāh (953–975) (transferred to Egypt in 973)

=== Zirid Emirs rulers of Ifriqiya ===
- Abul-Futuh Sayf ad-Dawla Buluggin ibn Ziri (973–983)
- Abul-Fat'h al-Mansur ibn Buluggin (983–995)
- Abu Qatada Nasir ad-Dawla Badis ibn Mansur (995–1016)
- Sharaf ad-Dawla al-Muizz ibn Badis (1016–1062), — lost west Ifriqiya to Hammadid dynasty,(1018), declared independence from Fatimids (1045)

(Invasion of the Banu Hilal (1057) — Kairouan destroyed, Zirids reduced to the main coastal cities, rural areas fragments into petty Bedouin emirates)

- Abu Tahir Tamim ibn al-Mu'izz (1062–1108)
- Yahya ibn Tamim (1108–1131)
- Ali ibn Yahya (1115–1121)
- Abul-Hasan al-Hasan ibn Ali (1121–1152)

(Ifriqiyan coast annexed by Norman Sicily (1143–1160))

=== Norman kings of the Kingdom of Africa (Ifriqiya) ===
- Roger II of Sicily (1143-1154)
- William I of Sicily (1154-1160)

(All of Ifriqiya conquered and annexed by the Almohads (1160))

=== Hafsid governors of Ifriqiya ===
- Abu Muhammad Abd al-Wahid ibn Abi Hafs (1207–1216)
- Abd-Allah (1224–1229)
- Abu Zakariya (1229–1249)

=== Hafsid caliphs of Ifriqiya ===
- Muhammad I al-Mustansir (1249–1277)
- Yahya II al-Wathiq (1277–1279)
- Ibrahim I (1279–1283)
- Ibn Abi Umara (1283–1284)
- Abu Hafs Umar I (1284–1295)
- Muhammad I (1295–1309)
- Abu Bakr I (1309)
- Aba al-Baqa Khalid an-Nasir (1309–1311)
- Aba Yahya Zakariya al-Lihyani (1311–1317)
- Muhammad II (1317–1318)
- Abu Bakr II (1318–1346)
- Abu Hafs Umar II (1346–1349)
- Ahmad I (1349)
- Ishaq II (1350–1369)
- Abu al-Baqa Khalid (1369–1371)
- Ahmad II (1371–1394)
- Abd al-Aziz II (1394–1434)
- Muhammad III (1434–1436)
- Uthman (1436–1488)
- Abu Zakariya Yahya (1488–1489)
- Abd al-Mu'min (Hafsid) (1489–1490)
- Abu Yahya Zakariya (1490–1494)
- Muhammad IV (1494–1526)
- Muhammad V (1526–1543)
- Ahmad III (1543–1570)
- Muhammad VI (1574–1574)
- Jafari "Jafari the Clean" Yahya (1574–1581)
- Alem Nafirr (1581)

== See also ==
- History of Roman-era Tunisia
- History of early Islamic Tunisia
- History of medieval Tunisia

== Sources ==
=== Chronicles ===
- Ibn Abd al-Hakam, English trans. by C.C. Torrey, 1901, "The Mohammedan Conquest of Egypt and North Africa", Historical and Critical Contributions to Biblical Science, pp. 277–330. online; French trans. in De la Salle Histoire des Berbères et des dynasties musulmanes de l'Afrique Septentrionale, 1852, v.1, App. 1 (pp. 301–308)
- al-Nuwayri, French trans. in De La Salle, Histoire des Berbères et des dynasties musulmanes de l'Afrique Septentrionale, 1852, v.1, App. 2 (pp. 314–444) (From 647 raid through end of Aghlabids) and 1854, v. 2 App.1 (pp. 483–89) (for Zirids). Italian transl. in M. Amari (1851) Nuova raccolta di scritture e documenti intorno alla dominazione degli arabi in Sicilia, (p.27-163) (Aghlabids only)
- Ibn Khaldoun, French trans. in De La Salle (1852–56), Histoire des Berbères et des dynasties musulmanes de l'Afrique Septentrionale 4 vols, Algiers: Imprimerie du Gouvernment. v.1, v.2 v.3, vol. 4
- Ibn al-Athir extracts from Kamel al-Tewarikh, French trans. in De La Salle, Histoire des Berbères et des dynasties musulmanes de l'Afrique Septentrionale, 1854, v.2, App.#5, (pp. 573ff)

=== Secondary ===
- Julien, C.A. (1931) Histoire de l'Afrique du Nord, vol. 2 – De la conquête arabe à 1830, 1961 edition, Paris: Payot.
- Idris, Hady Roger (1959). La Berbérie orientale sous les Zirides X.-XII. siècles (in French). Vol. 1. Adrien-Maisonneuve.
- Idris, H. R. (1962). La Berbérie orientale sous les Zīrīdes, Xe-XIIe siècles (in French). Vol. 2. Adrien-Maisonneuve.
- Brunschvig, Robert (1982). La Berberie orientale sous les Hafsides des origines à la fin du XVe siècle (in French). Vol. 1. Adrien-Maisonneuve.
- Brunschvig, Robert (1984). La Berbérie orientale sous les Ḥafṣides: des origines à la fin du XVe siècle (in French). Vol. 2. Adrien-Maisonneuve.
