= Hafsid–Daouaouïda war =

1268 war

- Part of Hafsid–arab war
Date	1266–1268
Location	M'Sila, Zab
Result	Hafsid victory

Belligerents
Hafsid Dynasty	Daouaouïda : Banu Asakir and Banu Mas'ud

Commanders and leaders
Muhammad I al-Mustansir	Abu Al Qasim; Shibl Ibn Musa †; Siba Ibn Yahya †; Durayd Ibn Tazir †

Strength
Unknown	Unknown

Casualties and losses
Unknown	Massacre of the Daouaouïda

The Hafsid–Daouaouïda war took place in 1268 and ended with the massacre of most of the tribe, while the others fled to the rest of the Maghreb.

== Background ==
The Daouaouïda were a confederation of Arab tribes belonging to the Riyah who lived in the region of little Kabylia and around Constantine. This confederation rebelled after the accession of Caliph Muhammad I al-Mustansir in 1249, supporting the revolt of his brother Abu Ishaq. The caliph therefore decided to take revenge by organizing an expedition against this confederation.

== Battle ==
During the first battle in 1266, the Daouaouïda were allied with the cousin of Muhammad I al-Mustansir, Abu al-Qasim. On the day of the battle, Abu al-Qasim fled to Al-Andalus, leaving Shibl Ibn Musa and his two other leaders alone. As a result, the battle turned into a disaster, and the Daouaouïda were forced to retreat to Msila.

Two years later, a second expedition by the caliph led to the submission of the tribe of Banu Asakir and the tribe of Banu Mas’ud. Despite their flight to Biskra, their leaders were captured and subsequently beheaded.

== Aftermath ==
After the war, the remaining Daouaouïda fled to Fez, Tlemcen, and the western regions of present-day Algeria. Their numbers were greatly reduced due to the massacre they suffered at the hands of the caliph.
