= Collo Expedition (1282) =

- Part of Conflict between the Hafsid dynasty and the Crown of Aragon; Crusades
| Date | April 1282 |
| Location | Collo, Algeria |
| Result | Hafsid victory |

Belligerents
| Hafsid dynasty | Crown of Aragon; Byzantine Empire; Rebels |

Commanders and leaders
| Abu Ishaq Ibrahim I Abu Faris | Peter III of Aragon; Ibn al-Wazir † |

Strength
| Unknown | 800 knights 3,000 soldiers 150 ships |

Casualties and losses
| Unknown | All rebels killed |

The Expedition of Collo was a short-lived Aragonese military operation led by King Peter III of Aragon in June 1282 on the North African coast. The expedition aimed to support the rebellious governor Ibn al-Wazir in seizing Constantine from the Hafsid Sultanate. However, the operation arrived too late, as Hafsid forces had already crushed the revolt. Peter III briefly occupied and plundered the port of Collo, then withdrew, making the expedition a minor but notable episode in Aragonese ambitions in the western Mediterranean.

== Background ==
In January 1281, Peter III of Aragon began military preparations at the request of Ibn al-Wazir, a rebel who sought a Christian army to support his planned landing at Constantine and organize a revolt against Tunis. The expedition was scheduled for April 1282.

Before the expedition, Peter III signed an agreement with the Byzantine Empire and received 30,000 ounces of gold to support the campaign. The expedition was framed as a crusade.

== Expedition ==
In April 1282, Ibn al-Wazir revolted and declared himself Emir of Constantine. In response, the Hafsid sultan's son, Abu Faris, departed from Béjaïa and laid siege to Constantine on 9 June 1282. After a one-day siege, Abu Faris' forces captured the city, killing Ibn al-Wazir, his brothers, and all supporters.

Peter III arrived too late at Collo and engaged only in minor skirmishes against local chiefs reinforced by Abu Faris' troops. He failed to achieve any significant success, despite seeking assistance from Pope Martin IV, who declined to provide support.

== Aftermath ==
By late August 1282, Peter III of Aragon was recalled to Trapani in Sicily due to fears of an attack on Messina, ending the Collo Expedition.
