= Abu Hafs Umar =

Abu Hafs Umar (Abū Ḥafṣ ʿUmar) may refer to:

- Abu Hafs Umar al-Iqritishi (died 855), surnamed al-Ghaliz and al-Iqritishi, Muslim pirate
- Abu Hafs Umar al-Nasafi (1067–1142), Muslim jurist and theologian
- Abu Hafs Umar al-Murtada (died 1266), Almohad caliph
- Abu Hafs Umar bin Yahya (died 1295), Hafsid caliph
