= Ahmad II =

Ahmed II is a dynastic name. Among others it may refer to:

- Abu al-Abbas Ahmad II, Caliph of Ifriqiya from 1370 to 1394
- Ahmed II (1643–1695), Sultan of the Ottoman Empire from 1691 to 1695
- Qutb-ud-Din Ahmad Shah II (1429–1458), Sultan of Gujarat Sultanate from 1451 to 1458
