= Elisenda de Sant Climent =

Elisenda de Sant Climent (c. 1220–1275), was a Catalan woman who was captured as a slave.

She was born to Guillem Ramon de Sant Climent and married a Catalan farmer on Mallorca; they belonged to the Catalan colonists on Mallorca after the island was conquered by Aragon in 1229. They had a daughter, Guillemona.

In 1238, during the conquest of Valencia, Elisenda and her family was captured by Islamic slave traders on a raid on Mallorca. She and her daughter were taken to a harem of the emir of the Hafsid dynasty in Tunis, Muhammad I al-Mustansir. Her daughter was made Muslim and took the name Rocaia, and became the influential favorite of the son of the emir, Miromomeli, which gave also her mother privileges.

Elisenda made contact with the Catalan merchant Arnau Solsona who lived in Tunis, and eventually married him. She acquired items sent to her by her daughter, from the palace of the emir. Among them was a relic, sent to Elisenda by her daughter for the purpose of transferring it into Christian ownership. The relic consisted of a piece of the cloth which she described as a bit of the bandage the Virgin Mary used when tending to the wounds of Jesus. This relic was placed in the Old Cathedral of Lleida, where it was long preserved, and the story of Elisenda told.

In 1297, Arnau Solsona related this story as a witnessed declaration on his deathbed.
