= Abu Yahya Abu Bakr ash-Shahid =

Caliph of the Hafsid Sultanate in 1309

Caliph of the Hafsid Sultanate
- Reign: in September 1309
- Predecessor: Abu Asida Muhammad II
- Successor: Abu-l-Baqa Khalid An-Nasr
- Died: 1309; Hafsid Sultanate
- Dynasty: Hafsids
- Religion: Islam

Abu Yahya Abu Bakr ash-Shahid (Arabic: أبو يحيى أبو بكر الشهيد) or Abu Bakr was a grandson of the Caliph Abu Ishaq Ibrahim I, he ruled Tunisia for just 17 days in 1309.

== Life ==
The Caliph Abu Asida Muhammad II died in 1309, and, in accordance with the agreement signed by him with his nephew Abu-l-Baqa Khalid An-Nasr, he was to be proclaimed a caliph. The sheikhs of Almohad sheikhs of Tunis however elevated Abu Bakr to the throne. After 17 days he was deposed and executed by Abu-l-Baqa, who arrived with an army from Béjaïa. He was thereafter known as "Ash-Shahid" ("the martyr").

Preceded by Abu Asida Muhammad II	Hafsid dynasty 1309	Succeeded by Abu-l-Baqa Khalid An-Nasr
