= Abu Ishaq Ibrahim I =

Emir of Hafsid Sultanate from 1279 to 1283

Emir of the Hafsid Sultanate
- Reign: 1279–1283
- Predecessor: Yahya II al-Wathiq
- Successor: Abd al-Aziz I
- Died: June 1283; Hafsid Sultanate
- Dynasty: Hafsids
- Religion: Islam

Abu Ishaq Ibrahim I (Arabic: أبو إسحاق إبراهيم) was the Hafsid emir of Ifriqiya (1279–1283).

Ibrahim came to power during the struggles that broke out under Yahya II al-Wathiq. In contrast to his two predecessors, he only held the title of emir and did not claim the caliphate for himself. He was overthrown by the rebellion of Ibn Abi Umara.

== Early life (to 1279) ==
Ibrahim was the son of Abu Zakariya Yahya and a concubine named Ruwaida, and younger half-brother of Muhammad I al-Mustansir. He was described by the 14th century chronicler Ibn al-Khātib as being of average height but overweight, with brown skin and pleasant features.

When Al-Mustansir came to power, Ibrahim was placed under close surveillance but in 1253 he fled to the town of Zaraïa (near Sétif) where he took refuge with nomadic Thawawida tribesmen. Here he proclaimed himself ruler and began a rebellion and began preparing to advance on Gabes, but some of his allies abandoned him and he had to withdraw to Tlemcen, from where he fled to Granada and was received by Muhammad I. After the death of Al-Mustansir, he returned to Ifriqiya and overthrew Al-Wathiq in 1279.

== Period of rule (1279–1283) ==
Having obtained power, Ibrahim freed his five sons, who had been imprisoned by al-Mustansir. He then imprisoned his predecessor Yahya II al-Wathiq together with three of his sons, whom he put to death soon after. Wishing to emphasise his role as successor to his father rather than to his brother or nephew, he did not adopt the title of Khalifa but revived his father’s simpler style of Emir.

During Ibrahim’s reign the Hafsid state maintained good diplomatic and trading relations with the Italian states, paying tribute to Charles I of Naples as well as to the republics of Genoa and Venice. He also strengthened relations with his western tributary, Yaghmurasen Ibn Zyan of Tlemcen, marrying his daughter to Ibn Zyan’s son and heir.

In 1282 the governor of Constantine, Ibn al-Wazir declared rebellion, having secured military support from Peter III of Aragon. However by the time Aragonese troops landed at Collo, Ibn al-Wazir had been defeated and killed by Ibrahim’s son, Ibn Faris, governor of Bejaïa.

== Overthrow ==
Ibrahim was overthrown by a rebellion in the south of his territories that may have had Aragonese support. Ahmad bin Marzūq bin Abi Umara (known as Ibn Abi Umara) was from Msila and had previously tried to pass himself off as the Mahdi among the Maqil Arabs of Morocco. In 1282 he was in the Tripoli region, where a former retainer of Yahya II al-Wathiq claimed to recognise him as Al-Fadl, son of the former Caliph who had in fact been executed along with his father by Ibrahim. The local tribesmen rallied to his support, and though he was not able to take Tripoli, Gabes opened its gates to him. He took Gafsa, then Kairouan and Sfax, and was proclaimed Caliph. An army sent against him under Ibrahim’s son Abu Zakariya dispersed without fighting. In January 1283, as panic seized Tunis, Ibrahim took flight. Denied refuge in Constantine, he reached Bejaïa in February, where his son Abu Faris obliged him to abdicate, declaring himself Caliph with the name Al-Mu’tamid.

Abu Faris led an army against Ibn Abi Umara which met his forces in June 1283 near Kalaat es Senam. The result was the total defeat of Hafsid forces. Abu Faris was killed in battle, while three of his brothers and his nephew were captured and executed. The only family member who managed to escape was Ibrahim’s half-brother Abu Hafs Umar bin Yahya. Ibrahim and his remaining son Abu Zakariya fled Bejaïa. The son was able to reach safety in Tlemcen but Ibrahim was injured by a fall from his horse, captured and sent back to Béjaïa where he was executed by an emissary of Ibn Abi Umara in June 1283.

== Bibliography ==
- Stephan Ronart, Nandy Ronart: Lexicon of the Arab World. Artemis Verlag, Zurich et al. 1972, ISBN 3-7608-0138-2
- Ibn Al-Shamaa, The Light Evidence for the Pride of the Hafsid State, an investigation and presentation by Dr. Muhammad Al-Maamouri, Arab Book House, Tunisia, 1984, p. 75

| Preceded by Yahya II al-Wathiq | Hafsid dynasty 1279–1283 | Succeeded by Abu Hafs Umar |
