= Zab =

Zab or ZAB may refer to:

== Geography ==
- The Zab rivers:
  - Great Zab, or Upper Zab, river tributary to the Tigris
  - Little Zab, or Lower Zab, river tributary to the Tigris
- Al Zab, an Iraqi town at the confluence of the Little Zab with the Tigris
- M'zab, a region in Algeria
- Zab Emirate, a 15th century Algerian state
- Zweibrücken Air Base (ZAB), a former air base in West Germany
- Ząb, a village in Poland

== History ==
- Battle of the Zab, by the Great Zab in 750

== People ==
- Zab Judah, American professional boxer
- Zab Maboungou, Franco-Congolese writer and choreographer

== Abbreviations ==
- zab, the ISO 639-3 code for the San Juan Guelavía Zapotec language
- RU-ZAB, the ISO 3166-2 code for Zabaykalsky Krai
- Albuquerque Air Route Traffic Control Center, New Mexico, US, known as ZAB
- Zookeeper Atomic Broadcast, a consensus protocol used in Apache ZooKeeper
