= Abu Ishaq Ibrahim II =

Caliph of the Hafsid Sultanate from 1350 to 1369

Caliph of the Hafsid Sultanate
- Reign: 1350–1369
- Predecessor: Abu al-Abbas Ahmad al-Fadl al-Mutawakkil
- Successor: Abu-l-Baqa Khalid II
- Born: October or November 1336
- Died: 19 February 1369 (aged 32); Hafsid Sultanate
- Dynasty: Hafsids
- Religion: Islam

Abu Ishaq Ibrahim II or Abu Ishaq Ibrahim ibn Abu-Bakr (Arabic: أبو إسحاق إبراهيم بن أبي بكر) was the Hafsid caliph of Tunis from 1350 to 1369. He was the son of Abu Yahya Abu Bakr II.

== Ibn Tafragin ==
In 1350 the Almohad sheikh Ibn Tafragin overthrew Abu Ishaq's brother al-Fadl and had him proclaimed caliph instead. As Abu Ishaq was only thirteen years old, effective power remained with Ibn Tafragin for another 14 years. It was shortly after Abu Ishaq's reign began that the famous philosopher Ibn Khaldun was appointed to his first post in public service as chief clerk (sahib al-alameh) in Ibn Tafragin's administration.

== Wars and Marinid invasion ==
Abu Ishaq's reign was characterised by constant strife and rebellion. His cousins, the Hafsid rulers of Constantine and Béjaïa waged war on Tunis. Meanwhile, the powerful Banu Makki family in Gabès ruled the south and was effectively independent. Against this backdrop the Marinid ruler Abu Inan Faris of Fez, Morocco decided to make a fresh attempt to revive his father's expansionist plans. He took Algiers, Tlemcen and Médéa before turning his attention to the Hafsid domains. In 1352 he occupied Bejaïa and in 1356–1357, Constantine, Annaba and Tunis. Gabès submitted to him without a siege. However, as with the previous Marinid conquest, the Arab tribes of the interior of Ifriqiya soon rebelled and in 1357 the Dawadid Arabs were forbidden to collect a tax which they charged the sedentary, and the Arabs revolted; in 1357 Abu Inan Faris was compelled to retreat to Fez. Abu Ishaq Ibrahim had been forced to flee Tunis and hide in the interior. With the departure of Abu Inan Faris, he and Ibn Tafragin returned to Tunis. The Marinid ruler died in 1358, after which his empire broke up. The Zayyanid dynasty recovered Tlemcen and the Hafsid rulers of Béjaïa and Constantine were restored.

Under Abu Ishaq the work of rebuilding the walls of the medina of Tunis and extending it to include the medieval suburbs was undertaken. The gates of Bab Alioua and Bab El Allouj were also built during his reign.

== Later rule and succession ==
In October 1364, shortly after Abu Ishaq married his daughter, Ibn Tafragin died. For the first time, Abu-Ishaq was able to exercise power on his own. Meanwhile, the Hafsid ruler of Constantine Abu al-Abbas Ahmad II seized Béjaïa from his cousin Abu-Abd-Allah in 1366, thereby reunifying the Western Hafsid domain. Abu-Ishaq died in 1369 at the age of thirty two and was succeeded by his son Abu-l-Baqa Khalid II who was a young boy of no more than ten or twelve. Factional struggles quickly broke out and it was easy for Abu al-Abbas Ahmad II to occupy Tunis in 1370. Abu-l-Baqa escaped by sea but died in a shipwreck.

Preceded by Al Fadl	Hafsid dynasty 1350–1369	Succeeded by Abu-l-Baqa Khalid II
