= Kalaat es Senam =

Coordinates: 35.7650°N 8.3453°E

- Commune and town
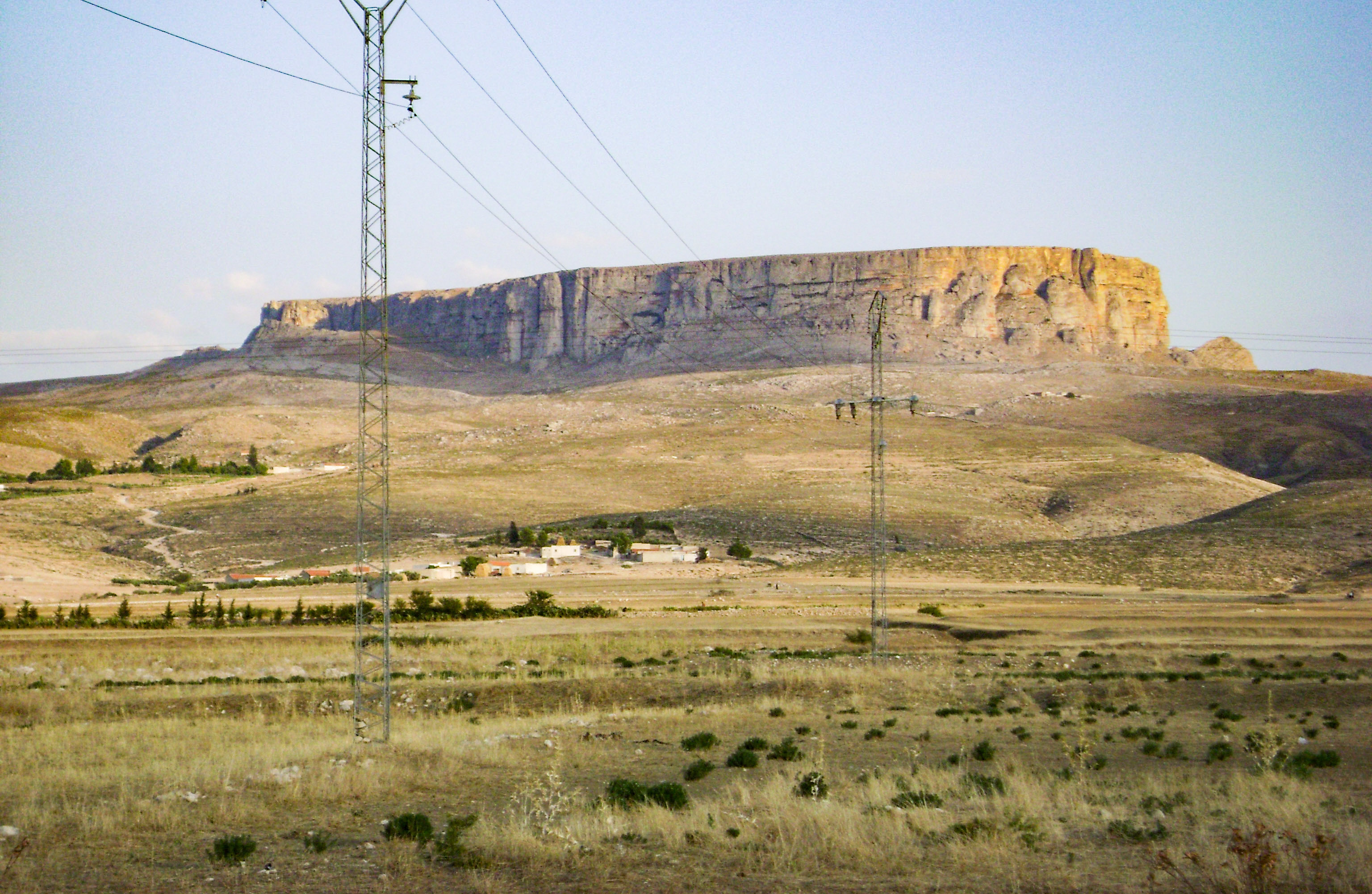
- Interactive map of Kalaat es Senam
- Country: Tunisia
- Governorate: Kef Governorate

Government
  - Mayor: Hana Amri (Nidaa Tounes)
- Time zone: UTC+1 (CET)

Kalaat es Senam, Kalaat Senan, or Kalâat Snan (Tunisian Arabic: قلعة سنان) is a town in western Tunisia in the Kef Governorate. It is the administrative center of Kalaat Senan Delegation and had 15,621 inhabitants (As of 2014 census). The town is a market town for the agriculture in the area, where wheat and oats are grown and cattle and sheep are grazed.

Kalaat es Senam is named after the nearby fortress (qal'a) built upon the Jugurtha Tableland (a mesa).

The town is located within the territory of the Ouled Boughanem tribe.

== Population ==
2014 Census (Municipal)
Homes	Families	Males	Females	Total
2539	2137	4037	4108	8145
