= Abd al-Wahid Zakariya ibn al-Lihyani =

Caliph of the Hafsid Sultanate from 1311 to 1317

Caliph of the Hafsid Sultanate
- Reign: 1311–1317
- Predecessor: Abu-l-Baqa Khalid An-Nasr
- Successor: Abu-l Abbas Ahmad
- Born: 1253
- Died: 1326 (aged 72–73); Alexandria
- Dynasty: Hafsids
- Religion: Islam

Abd al-Wahid Zakariya ibn al-Lihyani (Arabic: أبو يحيى زكرياء اللحياني, romanized: Abū Yaḥyā Zakariyyāʾ al-Liḥyānī) was the Hafsid caliph of Ifriqiya (1311–1317).

== Rise to power ==
Al-Lihyani's rise began when he was appointed to the senior office of "sheikh of the Almohads" in 1295 by Abu Asida Muhammad II. From this position he controlled the army and foreign affairs. Al-Lihyani brokered the agreement between Abu Asida and Abu-l-Baqa Khalid An-Nasr of Béjaïa regulating the succession of the two domains. In 1305 he negotiated the commercial agreement with the Republic of Venice. He also maintained a friendly correspondence with James II of Aragon over the commandership of the Catalan mercenary guard in Tunis, which nominally served at the King of Aragon's pleasure. Al-Lihyani also negotiated a ten-year truce between Tunis and Aragon in 1301. In a letter of 20 May 1302 to al-Lihyani, James praised the ‘wise and discreet’ counsellor for the ‘good will and strong affection’ he had shown him during the negotiations. In 1306, as commander of the army, al-Lihyani mounted an expedition to liberate Djerba from Christian control. The effort failed, but rather than return to Tunis, al-Lihyani joined a caravan heading east on the pilgrimage to Mecca. On his return he settled in Tripoli, where he was when Abu Asida died in 1309.

== Period in power ==
Once Abu-l-Baqa's brother Abu Bakr began his rebellion in Béjaïa, al-Lihyani began to advance towards Tunis with an army raised from Tripolitanian tribes. Critical to his successful seizure of power was the arrival of Sicilian ships to support him in the Gulf of Tunis, and the revolt of the Catalan mercenary guard in the capital. Once in power, in 1313 al-Lihyani entered into a secret correspondence with James II of Aragon, using the commander of the Catalan guard as an intermediary. Reminding James that his own mother had been a Christian, he indicated that he wished to convert to Christianity and solicited Aragonese support.

Al-Lihyani cultivated a reputation for piety, and respect for the law. While in the east he had met with the uncompromising religious scholar Ibn Taymiyya, and he made moves to bring the Hafsid domains into line with Maliki school of jurisprudence. His respect for the law was such that when his own son was accused of murder, he surrendered him to the qadi without demur.

== Ramon Llull ==
Possibly prompted by al-Lihyani's correspondence suggesting that he wished to convert to Christianity, Ramon Llull embarked on his final missionary journey to Tunis in 1314. Bringing letters of recommendation to al-Lihyani from James II, Llull wore Tunisian dress and maintained a diplomatic demeanour throughout his visit. He was allowed to study, converse and work without any interference from the authorities. He wrote his last work in Tunis in December 1315, and is thought to have died shortly thereafter. Al-Lihyani never converted and the entire episode was probably only a device to secure Aragonese support for as long as possible.

While in Tunis, Llull wrote some 30 tracts. Some were in Catalan and those in Arabic included Liber de Deo et suis propriis qualitatibus infinitis, Liber de bono et malo, Liber de participatione cristianorum et sarracenorum, Liber de inventione majore, Liber de agentia majore, Ars consilii and Liber de Deo et de mundo. In 1315, Llull brought one of his disciples, Simon de Puigcerdà, to Tunis. This friar translated into Latin some fifteen essays that Llull had already written, a number of which were dedicated to the "very wise" Abu Yahya Zakaria al-Lihyani and his clericis sapientibus (wise clerics).

== Abdication and succession ==
Throughout most of al-Lihyani's rule, Abu Bakr, sultan of Bejaïa, continued his attacks from the west. In 1316, he therefore began to make preparations to relinquish power. He had apparently come to admire Abu Bakr and saw his eventual ascension in Tunis as inevitable. Al-Lihyani therefore collected all the valuable items he could and sold them. Among these items was the famous library of Abu Zakariyya, founder of the Hafsid dynasty. By these means he raised 2000 pounds of gold and enough large pearls and rubies to fill two large sacks.

In March 1317, he announced he was embarking on a tour of the provinces, and left the capital. In fact he headed straight for Gabès. When the leaders of the army in Tunis reported that Abu Bakr was advancing, al-Lihyani replied, ‘You have money and troops; I approve everything you may do’. After al-Lihyani's departure from Tunis, his son Abu Darba Muhammad Al-Mustansir (Arabic: أبو ضربة محمد المستنصر) was released from prison and proclaimed caliph. He was only able to hold onto power for nine months in 1317–18 before he was obliged to flee as Abu Bakr entered Tunis. He tried to rally his forces in Mahdia and sought assistance from the Zayyanids of Tlemcen, but he was eventually obliged to flee again. He took refuge in Tlemcen, where he died in 1323. Al-Lihyani himself withdrew first to Tripoli, and when his son was forced to abandon Mahdia, he boarded a ship furnished by Frederick III of Sicily and went into exile in Alexandria. There, according to Ibn Khaldun, he lived prosperously and comfortably for the final decade of his life, dying in 1326.

Preceded by Abu-l-Baqa Khalid An-Nasr	Hafsid dynasty 1311–1317	Succeeded by Abu-Darba Muhammad
