= Abu Asida Muhammad II =

Caliph of Hafsid Sultanate from 1295 to 1309

Caliph of the Hafsid Sultanate
- Reign: 1295 – September 1309
- Predecessor: Abu Hafs Umar bin Yahya
- Successor: Abu Yahya Abu Bakr ash-Shahid
- Born: 1279
- Died: September 1309 (aged 29–30); Hafsid Sultanate
- Dynasty: Hafsids
- Father: Yahya II al-Wathiq
- Religion: Islam

Abu-Asida Muhammad II (Arabic: أبو عبد الله محمد أبو عصيدة) also known as Abû `Asida Muhammad al-Muntasir Billah, (1279–1309) was the Hafsid dynasty caliph of Tunis. He was the posthumous son of Yahya II al-Wathiq and successor of Abu Hafs Umar bin Yahya. He reigned from 1295 to September 1309.

== Life ==
During his reign treaties were signed with the Republic of Venice in 1305 and with James II of Aragon in 1301 and 1308.

During his reign there was an attempt to end the schism with the western branch of the Hafsids. Abu-Zakariyya, ruler of Béjaïa died in 1301 and was succeeded by his son Abu-l-Baqa Khalid An-Nasr. This prince approached Abu-Assida and concluded an agreement with him that whoever died first was to be succeeded by the other. A treaty agreeing to this arrangement was signed by both parties. Abu-Assida died in 1309 and, according to the agreement, his nephew Abu-l-Baqā Khalid was to be proclaimed emir, but instead a son of Abu Faris bin Ibrahim I, named Abu Yahya Abu Bakr I al-Shahid was proclaimed by the Almohad sheikhs of Tunis to the new emir.

Preceded by Abu Hafs Umar bin Yahya	Hafsid dynasty 1295–1309	Succeeded by Abu Yahya Abu Bakr ash-Shahid
