= Yahya II al-Wathiq =

Sultan of the Hafsid Sultanate from 1277 to 1279

4nd Sultan of the Hafsid Sultanate
- Reign: 1277–1279
- Predecessor: Muhammad I al-Mustansir
- Successor: Abu Ishaq Ibrahim I
- Born: unknown
- Died: 1279; Hafsid Sultanate
- Dynasty: Hafsids
- Religion: Islam

Abu Zakariya Yahya II (Arabic: أبو زكريا يحيى الواثق) known as Yahyâ II or al-Wathiq, was the son and successor of Abu `Abd Allah Muhammad al-Mustansir. He was the fourth Hafsid Sultan of Tunis who reigned over Ifriqiya from 1277 to 1279.

== Life ==
During his reign a new gate, the Bab Jedid was cut in the wall of the medina.

In 1278 there was an uprising of the province of Béjaïa against its Andalusian Chancellor Ibn al-Habbabar. The latter was known for his hostility towards the Almohads, and described by the chronicler Ibn Chamâa as the real ruler of Tunis. Ibn Khaldoun relates that the Chancellor sent his brother Abû al-Alâ 'Idrîs to Béjaïa to take care of the finances of the city, alongside the governor, the Almohad Muḥammad ben Abi Hilâl al-Hintâtî. When the governor had the chancellor assassinated in 1278 he was then obliged to look for someone who could replace the existing authority in Tunis that had appointed the chancellor.

Al-Hintâtî therefore called on the sultan's uncle, Abû Ishaq Ibrahim, to rebel. The latter had already revolted against Abû `Abd Allah Muhammad al-Mustansir, his brother and father of Abu Zakariyâ Yahyâ II, and had fled to Andalusia then to Tlemcen. Ibrahim also had the backing of king Pedro III of Aragon. Welcomed by Muḥammad ben Abi Hilâl al-Hintâtî and the notables of Béjaïa, he took the city in April 1279 and in August of the same year entered Tunis where he was recognized as sultan. His seizure of the throne was peaceful after the army leaders rose up and agreed to recognize him as the new sultan.

Abu Zakariya Yahya yielded his throne to his uncle, but as soon as he took power, Ibrahim ordered the execution of his predecessor and his three children. The only one to escape was his posthumous son, Abu-Assida Muhammad II, who was to be the 6th Hafsid sultan.

== Bibliography ==
- Dominique Valérian, CANDLE, PORT MAGHRÉBIN, 1067-1510, Rome, Publications of the French School of Rome, 2006, VIII-795 (ISBN 9782728310005 read online), p. 35-101
- Yver, G. "Ḥafṣids." Encyclopaedia of Islam, first edition (1913–1936). Ed. M. Th. Houtsma, TW Arnold, R. Basset, R. Hartmann. Brill Online, 2016. SEO. May 25, 2016 http://referenceworks.brillonline.com/entries/encyclopaedia-of-islam-1/hafsids-SIM_2608

Preceded by Muhammad I al-Mustansir	Hafsid dynasty 1277–1279	Succeeded by Abu Ishaq Ibrahim I
