= Abu-l-Baqa Khalid An-Nasr =

14th-century Hafsid ruler (r. 1309–1311)

Emir of the Hafsid Sultanate
- Reign: 1309–1311
- Predecessor: Abu Yahya Abu Bakr ash-Shahid
- Successor: Abd al-Wahid Zakariya ibn al-Lihyani
- Born: Hafsid Sultanate
- Died: 1311; Hafsid Sultanate
- Dynasty: Hafsids
- Religion: Islam

Abu-l-Baqa Khalid An-Nasr (Arabic: أبو البقاء خالد الناصر), was the Hafsid ruler first of Béjaïa and later of Tunis. In Béjaïa he succeeded his father Abu Zakariyya Yahya III, while in Tunis he seized power after the brief reign of Abu Yahya Abu Bakr ash-Shahid.

== Early life and rule ==
His full name was Abu-I-Baqa Khalid bin Zakariyya Yahya, he succeeded his father as the ruler of Hafsid Béjaïa, he ruled Bejaïa city and it surrounding territory.

In 1307 while he was ruler of Bejaïa the city was visited by the Christian scholar Ramon Llull. He was beaten and the qadi had him locked up. He remained imprisoned for six months, until Abu-l-Baqa decided to release him and expel him from his domains.

== Rule in Tunis ==
Abu-l-Baqa Khalid approached Abu Asida Muhammad II, the Hafsid ruler of Tunis, with proposals to end the division between the two branches of the family. Under the agreement which followed, the first to die would be succeeded by the other. Abu Asida died in 1309 but the sheikhs of Tunis proclaimed a son of Abu Faris bin Ibrahim I, Abu Yahya Abu Bakr I al-Shahid instead. It took Abu-l Baqa seventeen days to eliminate his rival and take over Tunis.

No sooner was he installed in Tunis than rebellions broke out in Constantine, led first by one of his cousins and later by his own brother, Abu Bakr Abu Yahya. The notables of Tunis found Abu-l-Baqa's rule too harsh and many supported the cause of his brother. As his support ebbed away, Abu-l-Baqa surrendered to his brother in the hope of saving his life, but he was quickly assassinated. Although Abu Bakr continued to rule in Béjaïa, he quickly lost control of Tunis to his remote cousin, Abd al-Wahid Zakariya ibn al-Lihyani, so the Hafsid state remained divided.

| Preceded by Abu Yahya Abu Bakr ash-Shahid | Hafsid dynasty 1309–1311 | Succeeded by Abd al-Wahid Zakariya ibn al-Lihyani |
