= Abu al-Abbas Ahmad II =

Hafsid ruler of Ifriqiya from 1370 to 1394

Caliph of the Hafsid Sultanate
- Reign: 1370–1394
- Predecessor: Abu al-Baqa Khalid
- Successor: Abd al-Aziz II
- Born: 1329
- Died: 3 June 1394 (aged 64–65); Hafsid Sultanate
- Dynasty: Hafsids
- Religion: Islam

Abu al-Abbas Ahmad II (Arabic: أبو العباس أحمدر) (reigned 1370–1394) was a Hafsid Caliph of Ifriqiya. He restored the Hafsid kingdom to full power after a period of disarray which followed the invasion of Ifriqiya led by Abu Inan Faris of the Marinids. He reigned during the Barbary Crusade of 1390, a brief military expedition by French and Genoese crusaders.

== Biography ==
Abul-Abbas Ahmad II was the emir of Constantine, and later Constantine and Béjaïa, and the son of Abu Abdullah Muhammad, son of Abu Yahya Abu Bakr II.

By 1350, Constantine was virtually independent of the Caliph in Tunis, and from 1351 to 1356, Ahmad fought with the Tunisian branch of the Hafsid dynasty. In 1356, the Marinid sultan Abu Inan Faris deprived him of his possessions, but already in 1357 the sultan returned to Morocco, and Ahmad - to his possessions.

In 1366, Ahmad captured Bejaia from his cousin Abu Abdullah ibn Abu Zakaria, son of Abu Zakaria Yahya, another son of Abu Yahya Abu Bakr II.

In 1370, he easily captured present-day Tunisia and achieved the deposition of Caliph Khalid II, after which he was proclaimed the new ruler. His first measures on the throne were aimed at putting an end to the Bedouin uprising (1371) and alleviating the hardships of farmers.

Between 1371 and 1381, step by step, Ahmad II regained power in the south and southeast of Ifriqiya and finally conquered the Zab region. After 1381, he worked to strengthen power in the south to prevent the revival of local emirates. Due to the rivalry between the Marinids and the Abdelwadids and the struggle between them, the western border of the Hafsids' possessions remained calm.

Another problem of Ahmad was relations with Christian states fighting against pirate bases on the coast of Tunisia. In 1383, the Aragonese captured Djerba. The Republic of Genoa petitioned Pope Boniface IX for a crusade against the Hafsids, and in 1390, the Barbary Crusade was proclaimed. On 20 July 1390, the pirate stronghold of Mahdia was attacked by the Genoese with the support of the French and English knights led by Louis II of Bourbon. The city lasted until 20 September, and the besiegers were forced to lift the siege. Since then, the arrogance of the pirates has increased even more, but the Hafsids relations with Italian states have improved. In 1392, the Aragonese lost Djerba.

Ahmad died in 1394. He was succeeded by his son Abu Faris Abd al-Aziz al-Mutawakkil.

== See also ==
- Barbary Crusade

== Sources ==
- Abun-Nasr, Jamil M. A History of the Maghrib in the Islamic Period. Cambridge University Press, 1987. ISBN 0521337674 .
- Fossier, Robert; Jacques Verger; Robert Mantran; Catherine Asdracha; Charles de La Roncière (1987). Storia del medioevo III: Il tempo delle crisi (1250–1520). Giulio Einaudi editore. p. 368. ISBN 88-06-58404-9.
