= Muhammad I al-Mustansir =

Hafsid ruler of Ifriqiya from 1249 to 1277

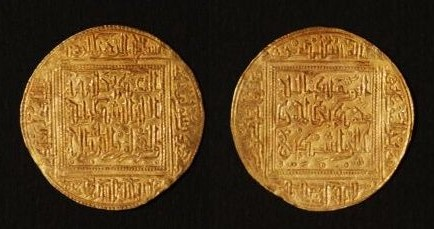
- Gold dinar of Muhammad I al-Mustansir

2nd Sultan of the Hafsid dynasty
- Reign: c. 1249–c. 1277
- Predecessor: Abu Zakariya Yahya
- Successor: Yahya II al-Wathiq
- Born: c. 1228
- Died: c. 1277 (aged 48–49); Hafsid Sultanate
- Dynasty: Hafsids
- Father: Abu Zakariya Yahya
- Religion: Islam

Muhammad I al-Mustansir (Arabic: أبو عبد الله محمد المستنصر, romanized: Abu Abd Allah Muhammad al-Mustansir ibn Yahya; c. 1228–1277) was the second Sultan of Ifriqiya of the Hafsid dynasty and the first to claim the title of Khalif. Al-Mustansir concluded a peace agreement to end the Eighth Crusade launched by Louis IX of France in 1270. Muhammad I al-Mustansir had been a vassal of the Kingdom of Sicily, but had shaken off his allegiance when King Manfred was overthrown by King Charles I.

== On Hunting ==
In 1247, he wrote a book called "On Hunting", which detailed the ways in which hunting in North Africa was undertaken at the time. An especially interesting chapter is on hunting with salukis, which teaches the hunter on how to manage this animal and how to hunt with it. Other aspects of the book involve the training and management of falcons, and other techniques utilized around his estate in Bizerte.

== Eighth Crusade ==
The Mamluk sultan Baibars had been attacking the remnant of the Crusader states in Syria. Baibars had seized the opportunity after a war pitting the cities of Venice and Genoa against each other (1256–1260) had exhausted the Syrian ports that the two cities controlled. By 1265 Baibars had captured Nazareth, Haifa, Toron, and Arsuf. Hugh III of Cyprus, nominal king of Jerusalem, landed in Acre to defend that city, while Baibars marched as far north as Armenia, which was at that time under Mongol control.

These events led to Louis' call for a new crusade in 1267. Louis was soon convinced by his brother Charles I, King of Naples and Sicily, to attack Tunis first, which would give them a strong base for attacking Egypt, the focus of Louis' previous crusade as well as the Fifth Crusade before him, both of which had been defeated there. Muhammad I al-Mustansir was rumored to be sympathetic to Christianity by way of his connections with Christian Spain and was considered a good candidate for conversion. Accordingly, Charles suggested to his brother that the arrival of a crusade in his support might bring about al-Mustansir's conversion. Thus it was that Louis directed the Eighth Crusade against Tunis.

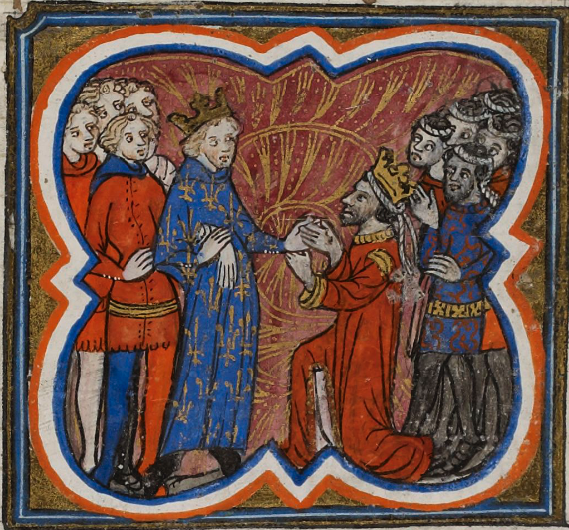
French miniature of Muhammad I al-Mustansir paying homage to Philip III of France after the Treaty of Tunis.

In 1270 Louis landed on the African coast in July. Much of the army became sick due to poor drinking water, and Louis himself died from a "flux in the stomach", one day after the arrival of Charles. His dying word was "Jerusalem." Charles proclaimed Louis' son Philip III the new king, but due to his youth Charles became the actual leader of the crusade.

Due to further diseases the siege of Tunis was abandoned on October 30 by an agreement with the al-Mustansir. In this agreement the Christians gained free trade with Tunis, and residence for monks and priests in the city was guaranteed, so the agreement was quite beneficial to the Christians even though the campaign as a whole was a failure. After hearing of the death of Louis and the evacuation of the crusaders from Tunis, Sultan Baibars of Egypt cancelled his plan to send Egyptian troops to fight Louis in Tunis.

== Diplomatic relations ==
According to Ibn Khaldun the Hafsids maintained friendly relations with the Kanem–Bornu Empire and in 1257 the ruler of Kanem sent Al-Mustansir a giraffe as a diplomatic present.

He proclaimed a caliphate in 1253. After the Siege of Baghdad and the fall of the (sovereign) Abbasid Caliphate, Marinid sultan Abu Yusuf Yaqub of Morocco, Sharif of Mecca Abu Numayy and Emir of Granada Muhammad recognized him in 1258, 1259 and 1264 respectively. The Mamluk Sultanate may have recognised him in 1260.

== See also ==
- Ibn al-Abbar
- Elisenda de Sant Climent

== Notes ==
Preceded by Abu Zakariya	2nd Sultan of the Hafsid Sultanate c. 1249–c. 1277	Succeeded by Yahya II al-Wathiq
Preceded by Abu Hafs Umar al-Murtada (Almohad Caliphate) al-Musta'sim (Abbasid Caliphate)	1st Caliph of the Hafsid dynasty c. 1253–c. 1277	Succeeded by Yahya II al-Wathiq
