= Battle of Batin al-Qarn =

Battle part of Shabiyan revolution

- Part of Shabiyan revolution
- Jebel Al Qarn Al Ghazala, Tunisia
Date	1535
Location	Jebel Al Qarn, near Kairouan, Tunisia
Result	Decisive Shabiyan victory: Proclamation of the Shabiya Emirate

Belligerents
Shabiya	Hafsid dynasty Supported by: Spanish Empire

Commanders and leaders
Sidi Arafa al-Shabbi	Abu Abdallah Muhammad V al-Hasan

Strength
Unknown	Unknown

Casualties and losses
Unknown	Heavy

The Battle of Batin al-Qarn took place in 1535 during a military expedition launched by Abu Abdallah Muhammad V al-Hasan against the Shabbiyya forces led by Sidi Arafa al-Shabbi. The battle ended in the defeat of the Hafsid sultan, who was forced to flee to Tunis.

== Background ==
In 1534, Sidi Arafa al-Shabbi, a powerful Sufi leader, took control of Kairouan with the assistance of the Ottoman garrison, taking advantage of the decline of the Hafsid dynasty, which was facing the threat of the Spanish Empire. The Spanish captured La Goulette in 1535. Faced with this threat, Abu Abdallah Muhammad V al-Hasan decided to attempt to subdue the Shabbiyya dynasty. He launched several campaigns against Kairouan in 1535, 1537, and 1540, all of which ended in failure.

== Battle ==
Abu Abdallah Muhammad V al-Hasan launched a campaign against Kairouan following Sidi Arafa al-Shabbi’s declaration of independence.

The Hafsid army advanced along the route passing through El Fahs, Jebibina, and Sbikha. The troops eventually reached Batin al-Qarn, approximately 10 km west of Kairouan. During the night, Arafa launched a surprise attack on the Hafsid camp. The Shabbiyya fighters raised the cry of “Allahu Akbar”, prompting a large part of the Hafsid army to defect to Arafa’s side.

Al-Hasan fled towards Tunis, abandoning his treasury and military equipment.

== Aftermath ==
Following the Hafsid defeat, the sultan fled to Tunis, while Sidi Arafa al-Shabbi proclaimed the establishment of the Shabbiyya Emirate in Kairouan.

== Sources ==
- Ben Ashour, Mohamed-El Aziz (2019). "Soufisme et résistance: L'épopée des Chebbiya". Leaders.
- Ivanov, Nicolaï (1996). La conquête ottomane des pays arabes (in French). institut d’ortientalisme près l’académie des sciences de Russie.
- Al-Chabbi, Ali (1982). عرفة الشابي رائد النضال القومي في العهد الحفصي (in Arabic).
- Serifoglu, Metin (2022). التيار الصوفي في البلاد التونسية وموقفه من السلطة السياسية خلال القرنين 15 و16م (in Arabic).
