= Capture of Tunis (1569) =

1569 battle

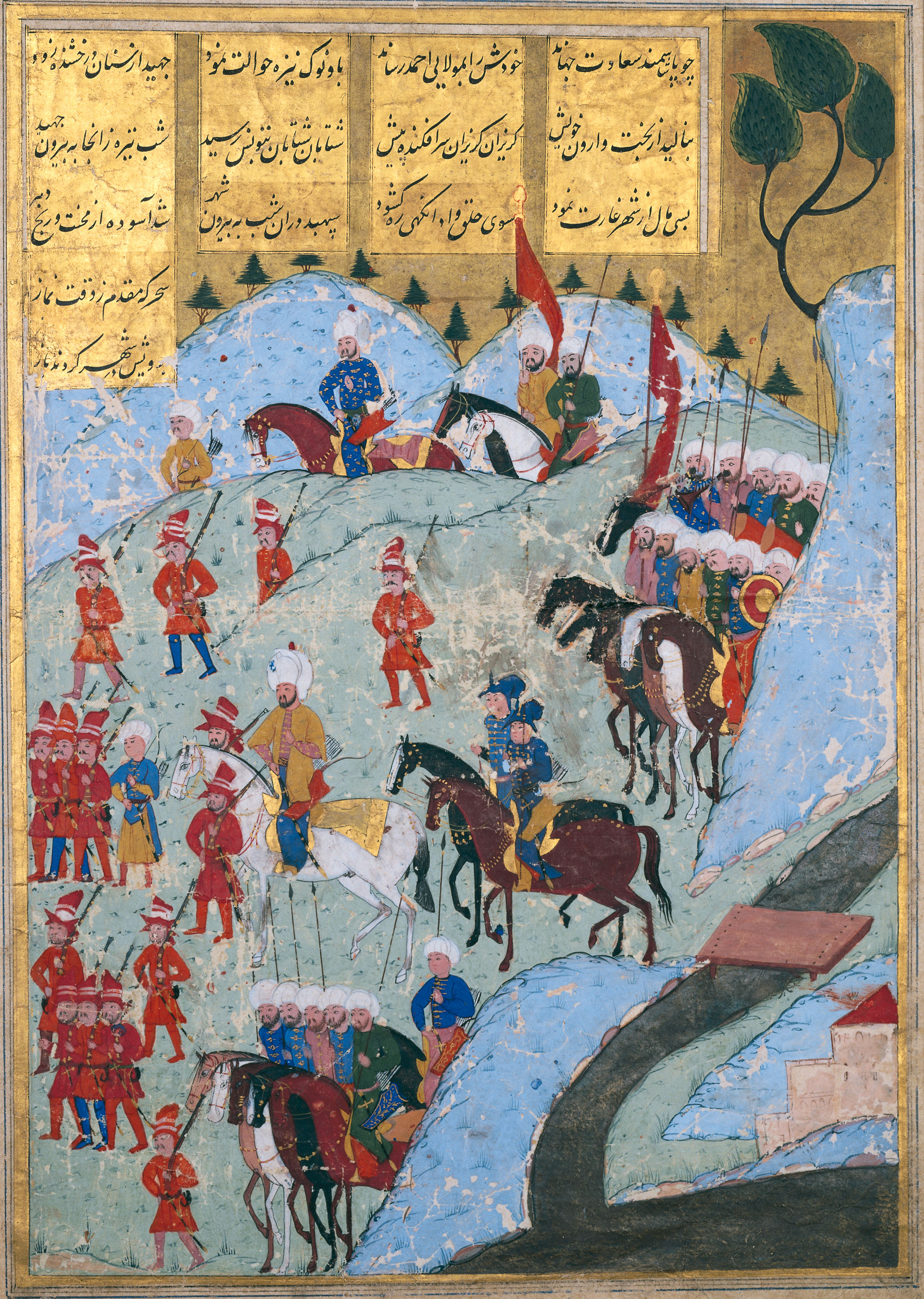
- Ottoman troops (about 5,000 janissaries) and Kabyle troops, led by Uluç Ali, Pasha of Algiers, marching on Tunis in 1569. Şahname-ı Selim Han, 1581
Location
Result
Tunis
Ottoman-Algerian victory
- Tunis is conquered

Belligerents
Ottoman Empire: Regency of Algiers; Kingdom of Kuku; Kingdom of Beni Abbas	Hafsid Dynasty (Spain) Spanish Empire

Commanders and leaders
Uluç Ali	Abu al-Abbas Ahmad III

Units involved
5,300 janissaries 6,000 Kabyle cavalry	Unknown

Casualties and losses
Unknown	Unknown

The Capture of Tunis in 1569 was a campaign led by Uluç Ali to conquer Tunis.

In 1569 the Beylerbey of Algiers, Uluç Ali, set off over land toward Tunis with 5,300 janissaries and 6,000 Kabyle cavalry from the Kingdom of Kuku and the Kingdom of Beni Abbes.

Uluç Ali encountered the Hafsid sultan at Beja, west of Tunis, Uluç Ali defeated him in battle and conquered Tunis without suffering any great losses. Mulay Ahmad III was forced to take refuge in the Spanish presidio of La Goletta in the bay of Tunis.

The Christian forces were able to recover Tunis in 1573 however the Ottoman forces under Uluç Ali conquered Tunis yet again in 1574.
