= Hafsid campaign in Kairouan and Sousse =

1537 military campaign

- Part of Hafsid-Shabiyan War
Date	1537
Location	Kairouan and Sousse
Result	Shabiyan victory

Belligerents
Emirate of Shabiyah	Hafsid dynasty Kingdom of Sicily

Commanders and leaders
Sidi Arafa	Abu Abdallah Muhammad V al-Hasan; Charles V

Strength
Unknown	Unknown

Casualties and losses
Unknown	High

The Hafsid Campaign to Kairouan and Sousse took place in 1537 and pitted the Shabiya Emirate against the Hafsid dynasty and the Kingdom of Sicily.

== Background ==
In 1536, the fall of Bizerte to the Spanish set the region ablaze. Local inhabitants were forced to finance the reconstruction of their own defenses, a burden that fueled the growing resentment of the Shabiya towards the Hafsids.

== The Expedition ==
In 1537, Sidi Arafah led a rebellion in Kairouan against the authority of the Hafsids. In response, the Sultan sought assistance from Charles V, who dispatched his army to Kairouan and landed forces at Sousse. Despite these efforts, the expedition ended in a fiasco, and both the Spanish and the Hafsids suffered heavy losses.

== Aftermath ==
Two years later, Andrea Doria exacted his revenge by launching attacks against Kelibia, Sousse, Monastir, and Sfax. However, this did not prevent a second defeat at the hands of the Chabbia in Kairouan in 1542.
