= Capture of Mahdia (1550) =

1550 naval siege and land capture of Mahdia

- Part of Spanish–Ottoman wars
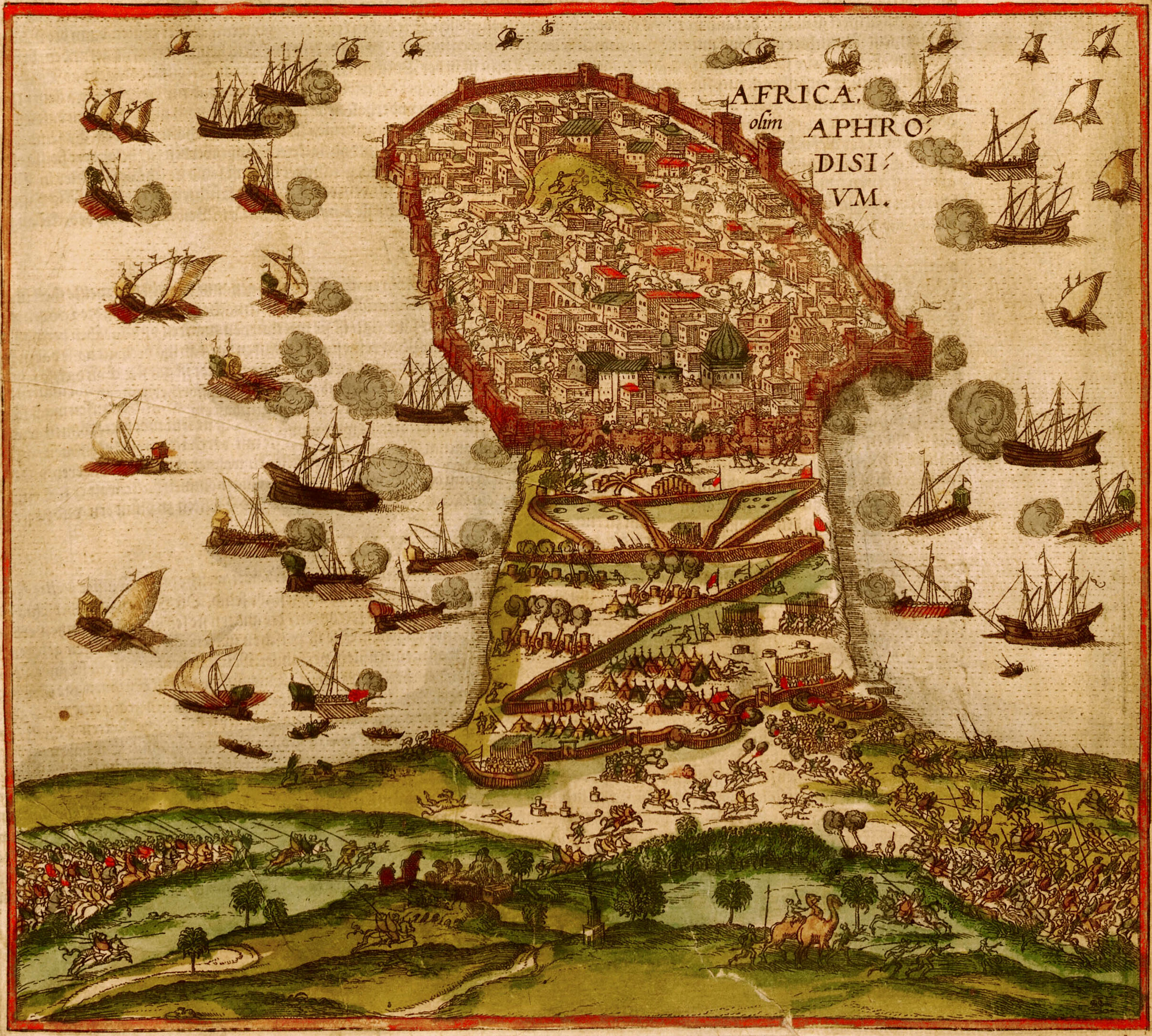
- Mahdia in 1535. Engraving of 1575 by Braun and Hogenberg.
Date	28 June – 8 September 1550
Location	Mahdia, present-day Tunis 35°30′17″N 11°03′44″E
Result	Spanish victory

Belligerents
Spanish Empire; Knights of Malta; Republic of Genoa	Ottoman Empire

Commanders and leaders
Andrea Doria; Bernardino de Mendoza; Claude de la Sengle	Turgut Reis; Hesar

Strength
52 galleys 28 naos Unknown soldiers	Unknown in Mahdia; 3,700 Moors; 800 Turks; 60 cavalry

Casualties and losses
500 killed and 1,000 wounded	7,000 killed or captured in the assault

The capture of Mahdia was an amphibious military operation that took place from June to September, 1550, during the struggle between the Ottoman Empire and the Spanish Habsburgs for the control of the Mediterranean.

A Spanish naval expedition under the command of the Genoese condottiero and admiral Andrea Doria and the Spaniard Bernardino de Mendoza, supported by the Knights of Malta under their Grand Master Claude de la Sengle, besieged and captured the Ottoman stronghold of Mahdia or Mahdiye, defended by the Ottoman Admiral Turgut Reis, known as Dragut, who was using the place as a base for his piratical activities throughout the Spanish and Italian coasts. Mahdia was abandoned by Spain three years later, and all its fortifications were demolished to prevent a re-occupation of the city by the Ottomans.

== Background ==
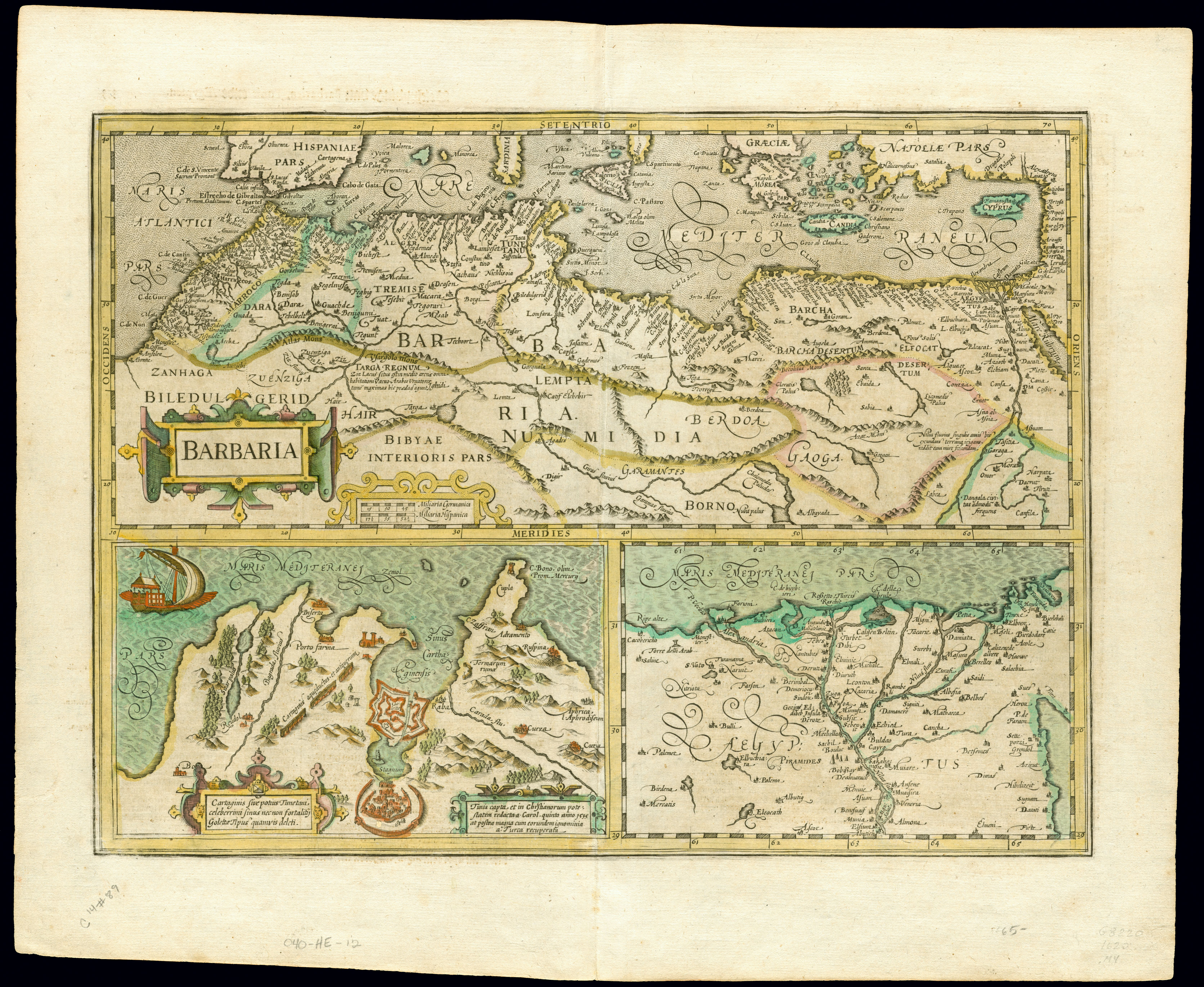
Map of the Barbary States by Gerard Mercator. Originally published by Jodocus Hondius.

In 1550 the Hafsid kingdom of Tunis, which stretched from the east of modern Algeria to the west of modern Libya, was mired in anarchy, ruled by a council of chieftains that fought each other and none of whom recognized the authority of the Sultan of Tunis, Abu al-Abbas Ahmad III, who had deposed and blinded his father Hasan, a protégé of the Emperor Charles V. In the spring of 1550, taking advantage of the situation, the Ottoman admiral Turgut Reis, with the aid of one of the local leaders, took control of the coastal town of Mahdia, located atop a rock advanced into the sea and defended by two circles of walls with towers and a citadel encircled by a moat.

In 1546, Turgut Reis, also known as Dragut, had organized a fleet of 25 brigantines and harassed the Calabrian and Neapolitan coasts as part of a campaign that culminated in the capture of Mahdia. Fearing that the town would become a base for the Barbary corsairs, which threatened the Christian shipping in the Western Mediterranean, the Holy Roman Emperor Charles V, supported by the Papacy and the Knights of Malta, decided to organize an expedition to capture the city. The command of the enterprise was entrusted to the Genoese admiral Andrea Doria and to Bernardino de Mendoza, Captain General of the galleys of Spain. They led a fleet of 52 galleys and 28 naos which carried on board an army led by Captain General Juan de la Vega, Viceroy of Sicily, and siege weapons and supplies provided by de la Vega himself and the Viceroy of Naples.

== Expedition ==
=== Siege ===
The Spanish fleet set sail to Mahdia on 24 June 1550 and arrived there four days later. The city was defended by the nephew of Turgut Reis, Hesar, who had spent two months locking cattle and storing rice and beans enough to feed the city for a year, in anticipation of being under siege. The landing of the Spanish troops took place under the protection of the galleys' cannons and out of Mahdia's gun reach. Within hours the Ottoman infantry and cavalry were driven out of a hill they occupied, and the next day the city was completely surrounded by trenches dug six hundred meters from the walls. Luis Pérez de Vargas, mayor of the castle of La Goulette, who was in command of the Spanish artillery, ordered to install several heavy pieces on the hill occupied the previous day to cover the locations of the 18 lighter pieces that had detached to beat the walls. The same day the first assault was launched, but it was repelled because the moat had not been filled. Despite advancing the artillery close to the walls and improving the trenches, the besiegers, harassed continuously by sallies of the Ottoman garrison, did not make significant progresses in the following days.

=== Ottoman attempt of relief ===
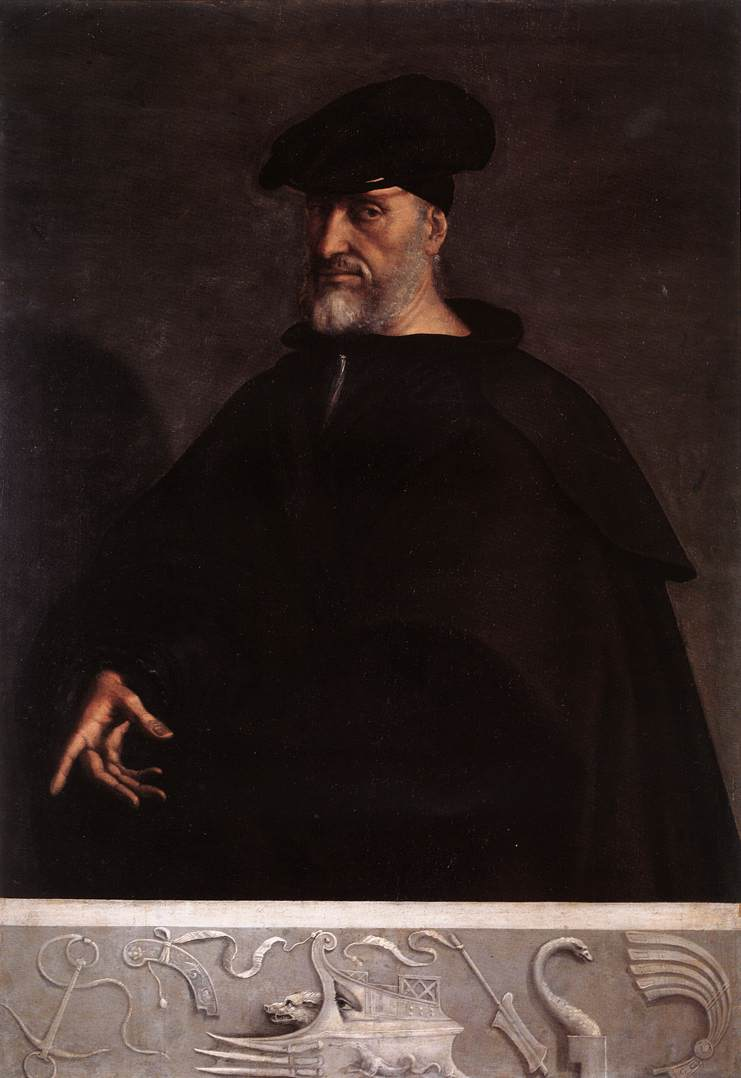
Portrait of Andrea Doria, c. 1520, by Sebastiano del Piombo.

Turgut Reis received news of the siege while he was plundering the coast of Valencia. After being repulsed by the inhabitants of Alzira, Sueca, and other villages, the Ottoman admiral sailed along the Barbary Coast calling for help and money to pay an army to relieve Mahdia. The Bey of Tunis and the chieftain of Caruan refused to help him, but he managed to assemble a force composed of 3,700 Moors, 800 Turks, and 60 sipahis, which his fleet disembarked near Mahdia under cover of night. He also sent a man who swam through the Spanish blockade and entered into Mahdia to inform his nephew Hesar.

At dawn on 25 July 1550, Turgut Reis's troops, hidden in an olive grove, attacked the Spanish along with Mahdia's garrison, which made an unexpected sallie. They managed to penetrate the trenches and the besieging camp, but the Spanish troops, with artillery support from the galleys, decimated and forced them back into Mahdia's walls. Turgut Reis took refuge in his galleys and retired to Djerba. Despite the victory, the Christian losses were high. Among the dead was the commander of the Spanish artillery, Luis Pérez de Vargas.

=== End of the siege ===
After the failed attack by the defenders, the Christian commanders ordered four galleys to patrol the area during the night to prevent further attacks. Several others were also sent to Sicily carrying the wounded and ill soldiers and requests for replacements and ammunition, which were provided from Milan, Florence, Lucca, and Genoa. Pending receipt of them, the siege engineers remained looking for the weakest points of Mahdia's defenses. It was García Álvarez de Toledo, 4th Marquis of Villafranca, who had the idea of bombing the walls from the sea, forming a gun battery on two galleys previously deforested and united to each other with hangers and planks. Nine pieces of artillery were settled on the platform, which was protected by shields and parapet, prior to anchoring the galleys off the walls.

On 8 September 1550, the guns of García Álvarez de Toledo's galleys, along with the land batteries and of the other naval artillery, opened fire on the city. The bombardment, which did not end until two days later, opened large gaps in Mahdia's defenses. Then, at the orders of their officers, the Spanish soldiers stormed the fortifications in three different points. One attack was repulsed, but the other two overwhelmed the defenders and surprised the remaining Ottoman troops from their rear. The last defenders resisted inside the towers for a while, but they were finally defeated. Governor Hesar was captured, and about 7,000 of Mahdia's soldiers and civilians were killed or captured.

== Aftermath ==
Sancho de Leyva remained in Mahdia in command of a Spanish garrison until 1553. Charles V offered the charge of the town to the Knights of Malta but they refused it, so he ordered it to be dismantled despite it being a strategically important stronghold. The demolition tasks were carried out by Hernando de Acuña. Shortly after Mahdia was reoccupied by the Ottomans, but only to live by fishing and oil-works. The town remained under Turkish rule until the 19th century.

Sultan Suleiman, meanwhile, considered that Charles had broken the Truce of Adrianople and ordered Turgut Reis to resume the war against the Christians. After summoning up Turkish reinforcements he returned to the Barbary coast in August 1551, and succeeded in capturing Tripoli from the Knights of Malta. In 1560 he helped to defeat a Christian fleet at the battle of Djerba, but failed in an effort to take Malta, a failure that, together with that of the Ottoman governor of Algiers before Oran ans Mers El Kébir, allowed the capture in 1564 by Spain of Peñón de Vélez de la Gomera, a Christian success which was followed in 1565 by the decisive defense of Malta against the fleet of Turgut Reis.
