= Conquest of Tunis (1574) =

Ottoman victory over Spain

- Part of Spanish–Ottoman wars
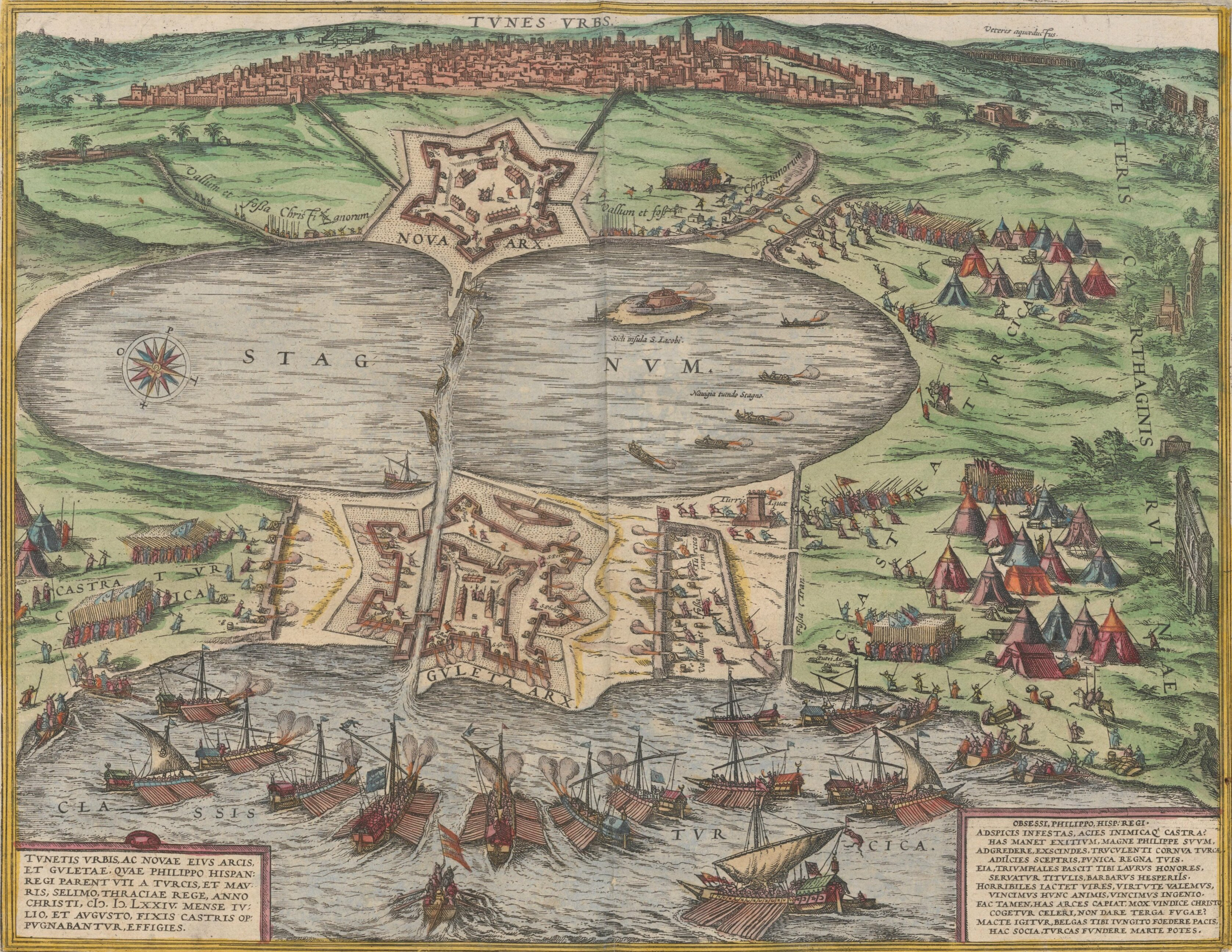
- The Ottoman fleet attacking Tunis at La Goulette in 1574.
Date	12 July – 13 September 1574
Location	Tunis
Result	Ottoman victory
Territorial changes	Ottomans capture Tunis

Belligerents
(Habsburg Spain) Spanish Empire	Ottoman Empire

Commanders and leaders
(Habsburg Spain) Gabrio Serbelloni (POW)	Occhiali; Koca Sinan Pasha

Strength
Total men: 7,000	250–300 warships Total men: 100,000

Casualties and losses
6,700 killed 300 prisoners	25,000 (Spanish claim)

The conquest of Tunis in 1574 marked the conquest of Tunis by the Ottoman Empire over the Spanish Empire, which had seized the place a year earlier. The event virtually determined the supremacy in North Africa vied between both empires in favour of the former, sealing the Ottoman domination over eastern and central Maghreb, with the Ottoman dependencies in Algiers, Tunis and Tripoli ensuing coming to experience a golden age as corsair states.

== Background ==
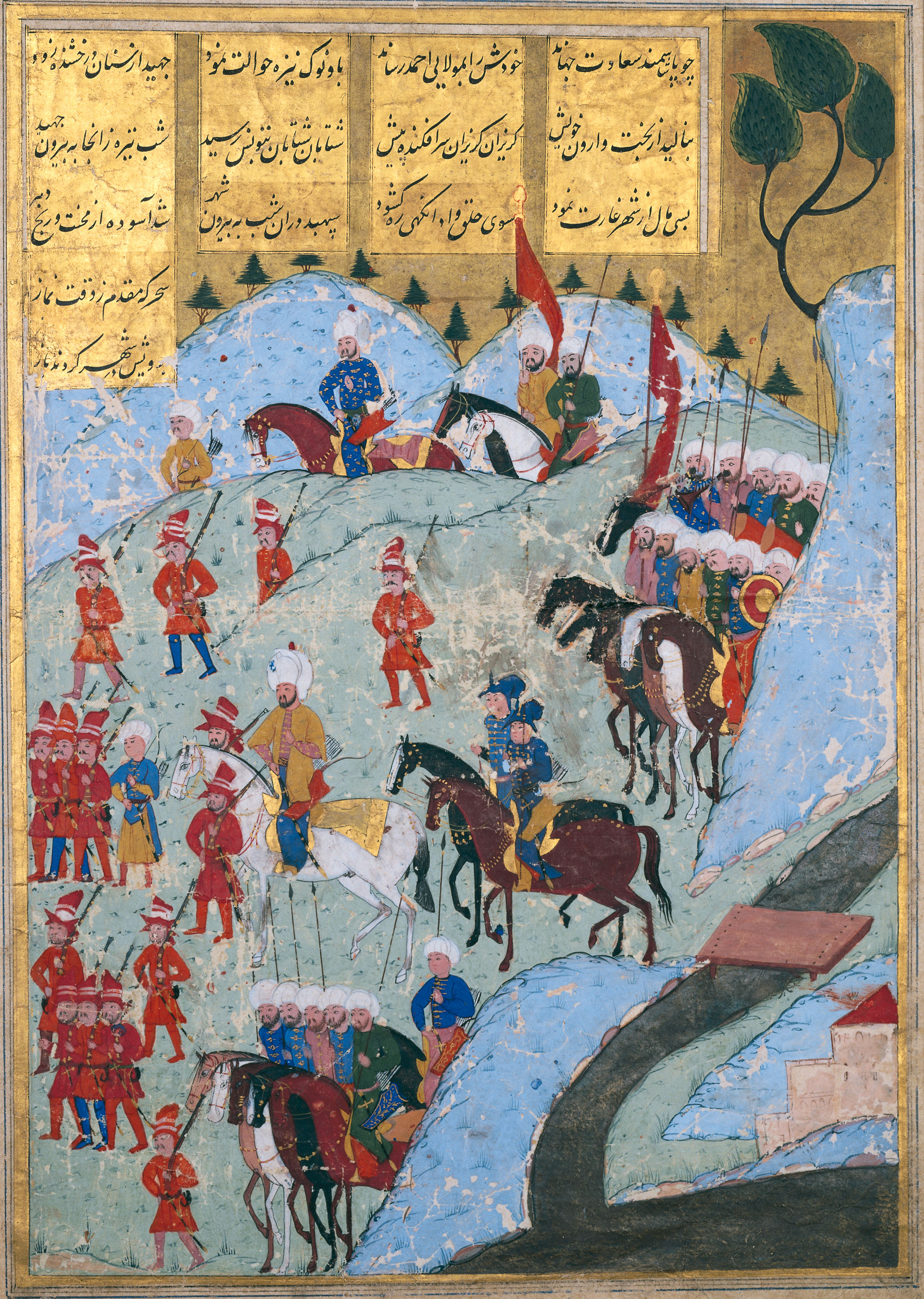
Ottoman troops (about 5,000 janissaries) and Kabyle troops, led by Uluç Ali, Pasha of Algiers, marching on Tunis in 1569

Tunis had initially been conquered by the Ottomans under Hayreddin Barbarossa in 1534. In the next year, however, Holy Roman Emperor Charles V had launched a major expedition and captured it in turn. He established a garrison and a vassal ruler in the person of Lhacène of the Hafsid dynasty. The Bey of Algiers Uluj Ali Pasha captured Tunis in 1569 for the Ottoman Empire, but in the aftermath of the 1571 Christian victory at the Battle of Lepanto, John of Austria re-conquered Tunis in October 1573.

== Capture of Tunis ==
In 1574, William of Orange and Charles IX of France, through his pro-Huguenot ambassador François de Noailles, Bishop of Dax, tried to obtain the support of the Ottoman ruler Selim II in order to open a new front against the Spanish king Philip II. Selim II sent his support through a messenger, who endeavoured to put the Dutch in contact with the rebellious Moriscos of Spain and the pirates of Algiers. Selim also sent a great fleet to attack Tunis in the Autumn of 1574, thus succeeding in reducing Spanish pressure on the Dutch.

In the Battle of La Goleta, Selim II mustered a fleet of between 250 and 300 warships, with about 75,000 men. The Ottoman fleet was commanded by Sinan Pacha and Alūj Ali. The Ottoman fleet combined with troops sent by the governors of Algiers, Tripoli, and Tunis, giving a combined strength of about 100,000. The army attacked Tunis and La Goleta; the presidio of La Goleta, defended by 7,000 men, fell on 24 August 1574. The last Christian troops in a small fort opposite Tunis surrendered on 13 September 1574.

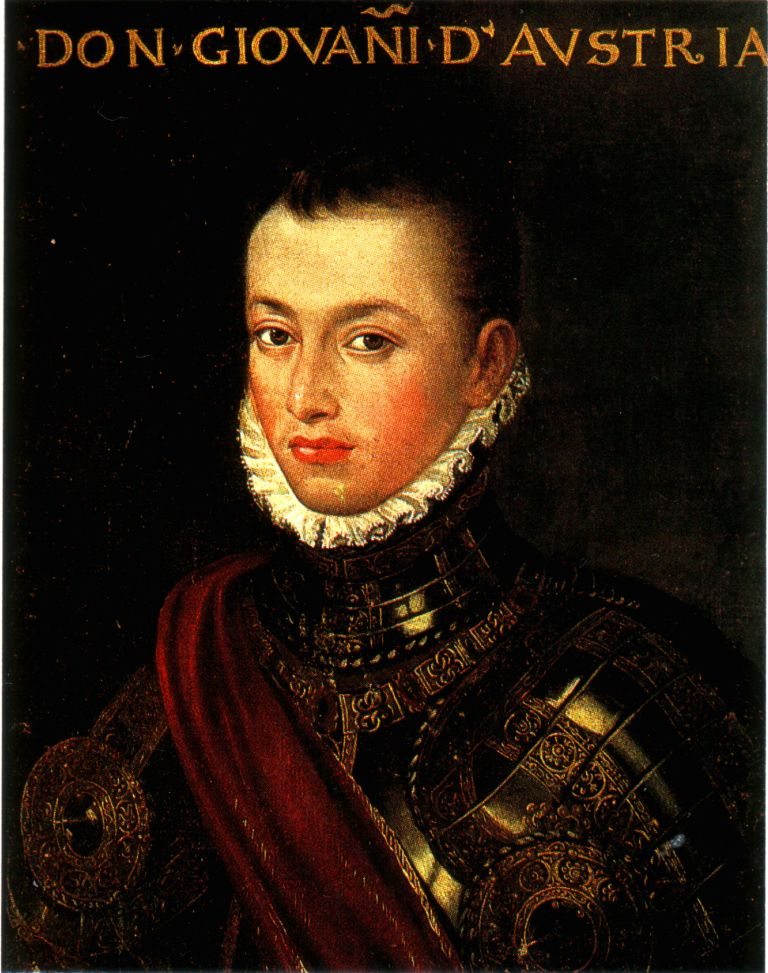
John of Austria attempted several times to relieve the siege, but in vain.

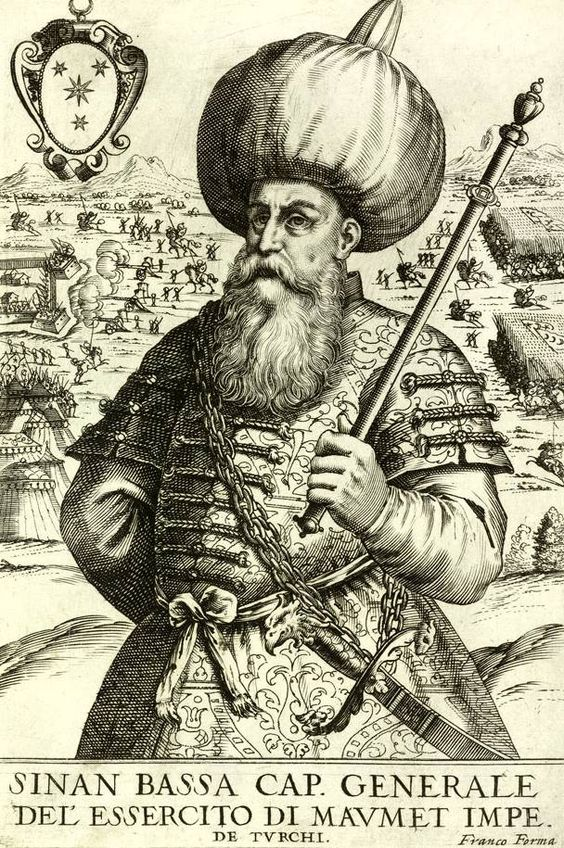
Koca Sinan Pasha, an Albanian Muslim, led the Ottoman capture of Tunis.

John of Austria attempted to relieve the siege with a fleet of galleys from Naples and Sicily but failed due to storms. The Spanish crown, being heavily involved in the Netherlands and short of funds was unable to help significantly.

Miguel de Cervantes, future author of Don Quixote, participated in these events as a soldier, and was among the troops of Don Juan of Austria which tried to rescue the city. He claims that the Ottomans led 22 assaults against the fort of Tunis, losing 25,000 men, while only 300 Christians survived. He wrote about the battle:

"If Goleta and the fort, put together, held barely 7,000 soldiers, how could such a small force, however resolute, come out and hold its own against so huge an enemy army. And how can you help losing a stronghold that is not relieved, and especially when it is surrounded by a stubborn and very numerous army, and on its own ground?"

— Cervantes, DQ I, 39.

Abd al-Malik, the future Moroccan King, participated in the 1574 conquest of Tunis on the side of the Ottomans.

Gabrio Serbelloni was the commander of the fort of Tunis. The general of La Goleta, Don Pedro Portocarerro, was taken as a captive to Constantinople, but died on the way. The captured soldiers were employed as slaves on galleys.

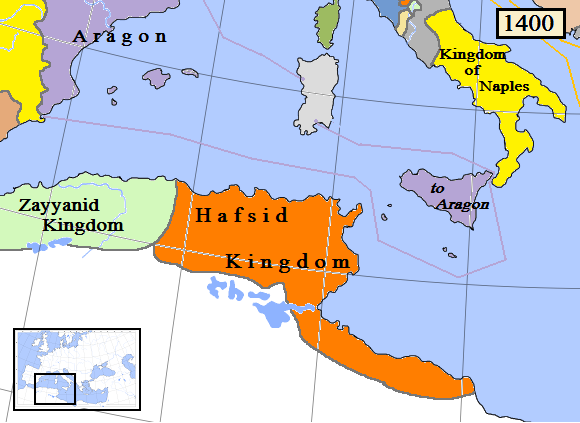
The capture of Tunis gave the territories of the Hafsid dynasty to the Ottoman Empire.

The battle marked the final establishment of Ottoman rule in Tunis, putting an end to the Hafsid dynasty and the Spanish presence in Tunis.

== Aftermath ==
The success of the Turks under Occhiali in the battle of Goleta managed in reducing Spanish pressure on the Dutch, and leading to negotiations at the Conference of Breda. After the death of Charles IX in May 1574, however, contacts weakened, although the Ottomans are said to have supported the 1575–1576 revolt, and established, in 1582, a consulate in Antwerp (De Turks-Griekse Natie). The Ottomans eventually made a truce with Spain, and shifted their attention to their conflict with Persia in the Ottoman–Safavid War (1578–1590). The Spanish crown fell into bankruptcy on 1 September 1575.

After the truce, Ottoman-Spanish hostilities resumed in 1591, even if they would not reach the magnitude of yesteryear.

== Gallery ==
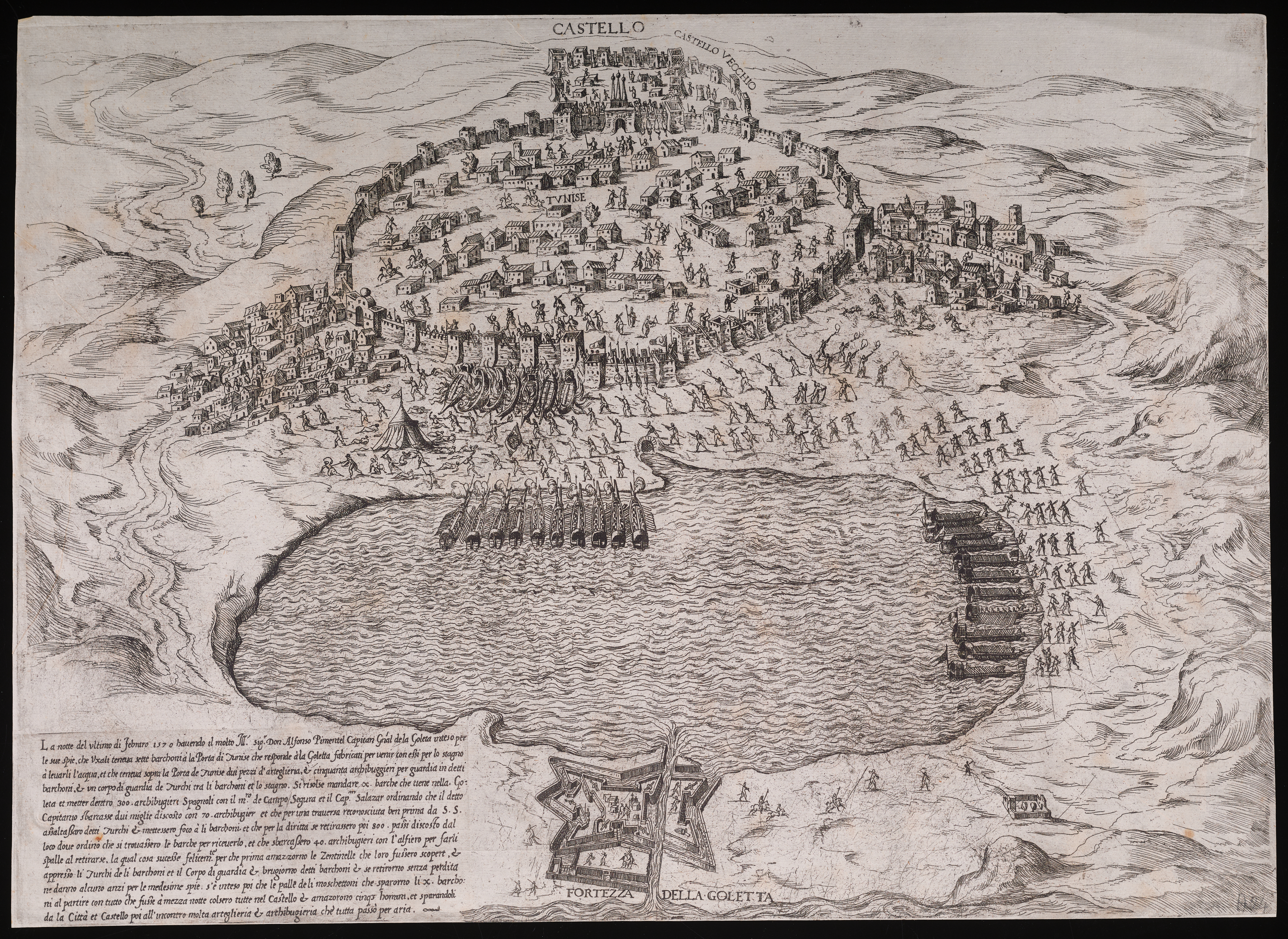
Anonymous and untitled map showing Turkish capture of Tunis and its port city of La Goulette (also known as Goletta and Halq al-Wadi), in 1570

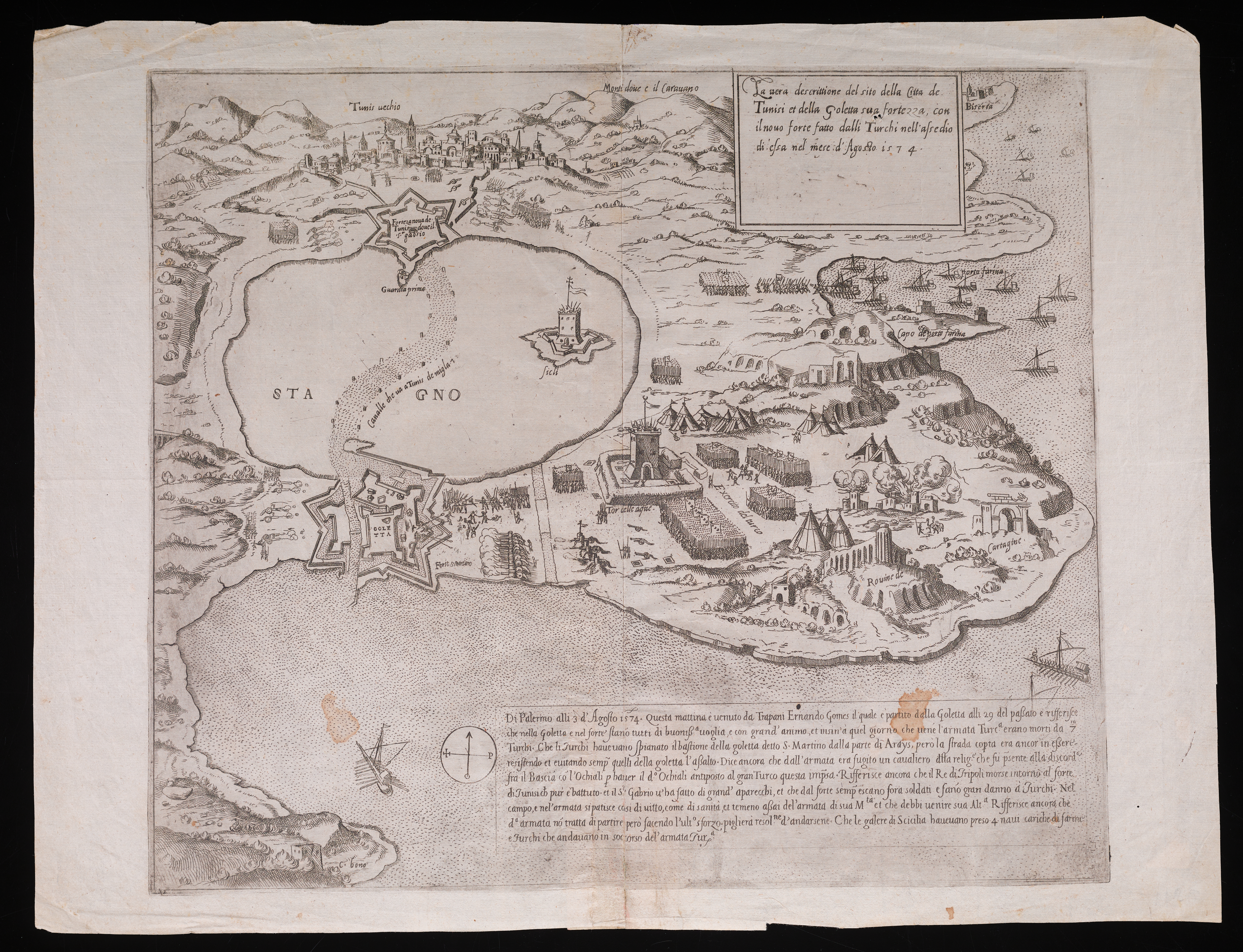
Anonymous map showing Turkish capture of Tunis and its port city of La Goulette (also known as Goletta and Halq al-Wadi), in 1574. Fortress at La Goulette, city of Tunis, ships, and armed forces shown pictorially.

== See also ==
- Ottoman Tunisia
- Siege of Castelnuovo
- Islam and Protestantism
- Franco-Ottoman alliance
