= Studia Islamica =

- Discipline: Religious studies, Islamic studies
- Language: English, French
- Edited by: Houari Touati

Publication details
- History: 1953–present
- Publisher: Brill Publishers
- Frequency: Biannual

Standard abbreviations
- ISO 4: Stud. Islam.

Indexing
- ISSN: 0585-5292 (print); 1958-5705 (web)
- LCCN: 56034629
- JSTOR: 05855292
- OCLC no.: 01766673

Links
- Journal homepage; Journal page at Publisher's website

Studia Islamica is a biannual peer-reviewed academic journal covering Islamic studies focusing on the history, religion, law, literature, and language of the Muslim world, primarily of the Southwest Asian and Mediterranean regions. The editor-in-chief is Houari Touati (School for Advanced Studies in the Social Sciences). Articles are published in English or French.

== History ==
The journal was established in 1953 by Robert Brunschvig and Joseph Schacht and was published by G.-P. Maisonneuve-Larose. Since 2013 it has been published by Brill Publishers.

== Abstracting and indexing ==
The journal is abstracted and indexed in:

- ATLA Religion Database
- EBSCO databases
- Index Islamicus
- International Bibliography of Periodical Literature
- Linguistic Bibliography
- Modern Language Association Database
- ProQuest databases
- Scopus
