= Abu al-Abbas Ahmad III =

Hafsid sultan of Tunis from 1543 to 1569

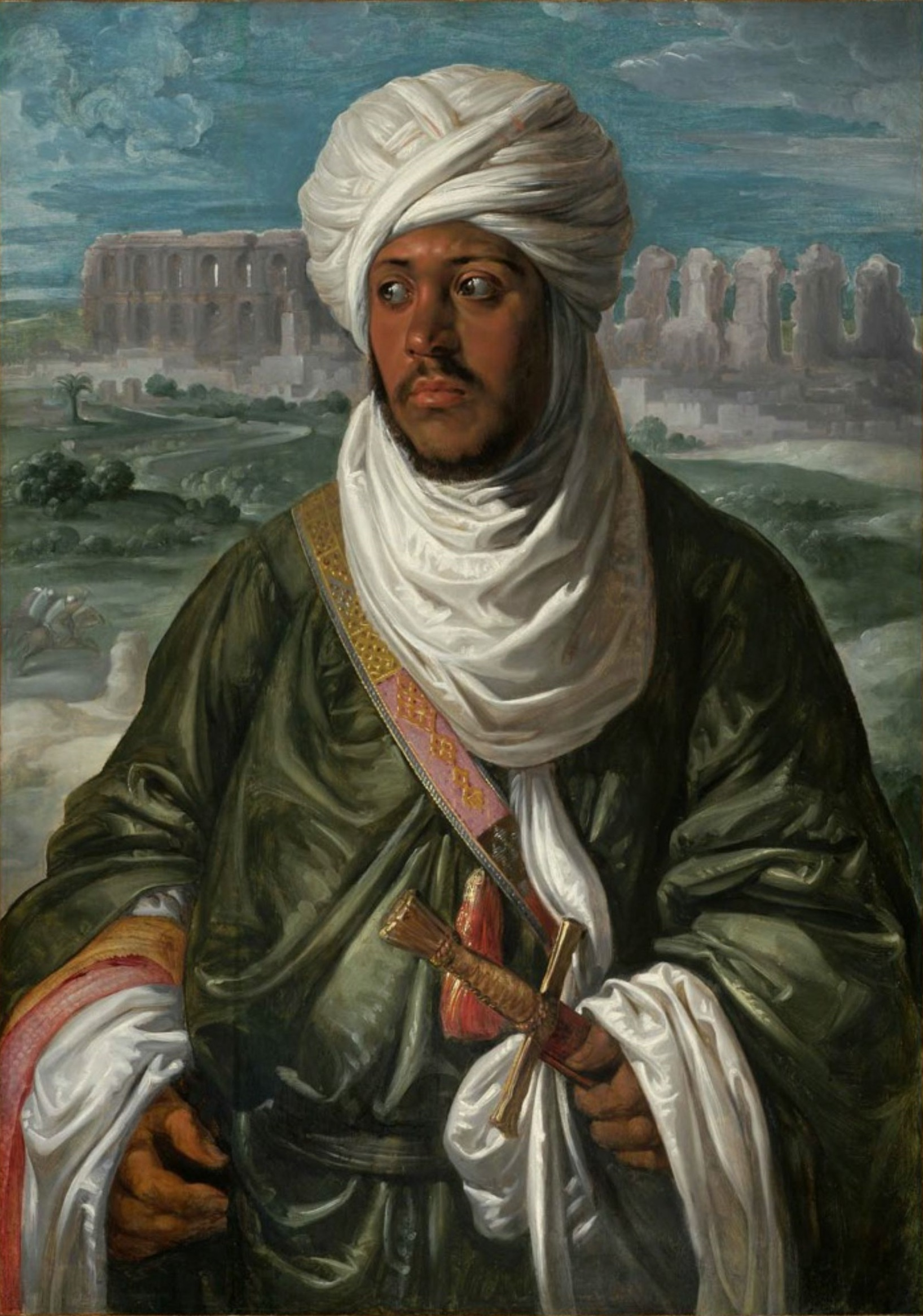
- Portrait of Mulay Ahmed by Rubens

Caliph of the Hafsid Sultanate
- Reign: 1543–1569
- Predecessor: Abu Abdallah Muhammad V al-Hasan
- Successor: Abu Abdallah Muhammad VI ibn al-Hasan
- Born: c. 1500
- Died: August 1575; Termini Imerese, Sicily
- Dynasty: Hafsids
- Religion: Islam

Abu al-Abbas Ahmad III (Arabic: أبو العباس أحمد) also known as “Moulay Ahmad” and “Moulay Hamida”, or “Mulay Amida” in some Italian sources, was the Hafsid ruler of Ifriqiya from 1543 to 1569.

== Succession ==
In 1542 his father Abu Abdallah Muhammad V al-Hasan set sail for Italy, intending to gather weapons and munitions to strengthen his authority. During his absence Ahmad rebelled, declaring that his father was intending to become a Christian and hand the country over to the Spanish. Abu Abdallah Muhammad returned to Tunis, but he was captured by Ahmad. Given the choice between execution and blinding, he opted for blinding and went into exile.

His departure did not secure power for Ahmad however. Francisco de Tovar, governor of the fortress of La Goulette became involved in intrigues to place on the throne a Hafsid candidate who would ensure the best interests of Spain. While Ahmad was absent from Tunis he arranged for the former caliph’s brother Abdelmalik to enter the kasbah in disguise and have himself proclaimed sultan. Just thirty six days later he died of a mysterious fever, but not before he had paid in full the tribute due to Spain under its treaty with Tunis, as well as 6,000 ducats for the upkeep of the Spanish garrison in La Goulette. The population of Tunis thereupon demanded as their ruler one of Ahmad’s brothers, Muhammad, whom Tovar was holding as a hostage. Tovar however placed Abdelmalik’s son, also called Muhammad, on the throne instead. He was a boy of twelve. Meanwhile Ahmad had managed to take refuge inland, where he succeeded in winning over the Arab tribes to his cause. He was eventually able to retake the kasbah, and the young Muhammad fled into Spanish protection.

== Relations with Spain and the Ottomans ==
Having ousted Spain’s puppet rulers, Ahmad sought to open diplomatic initiatives with the Ottomans, communicating with Dragut and sending an embassy to Istanbul. He also refused to deal with the commander of the Spanish galleys, Francisco de Mendoza. He blockaded the fortress of La Goulette, and its governor, Tovar, urged Emperor Charles V to restore his father Hasan. In November 1565, when Malta was on alert against Ottoman attack, the Viceroy of Sicily Don García de Toledo wrote to Philip II of Spain of his concerns about the Spanish fort in La Goulette, which he said "would not last more than twenty days" if attacked by a Turkish fleet. "The best thing for La Goulette would be to drive out the king from Tunis and build a fort in this city on the estuary side linked with La Goulette, and there would be no other king but Your Your Majesty, and... I think that we could get from them [i.e. the inhabitants of Tunis] the amount necessary for the expenses of the two forts.”

In 1550 the Spanish conquered Mahdia. They intended to restore Ahmad’s father Moulay Hasan to power, but plan failed when Hasan died, possibly poisoned by Ahmad’s agents. The Spanish then tried to instal Ahmad’s son as governor of the city, but ultimately withdrew to reinforce their positions in La Goulette. Ahmad could neither risk a new Spanish invasion nor rely on Ottoman support. He signed new treaties of peace and friendship with Spain on 24 January 1547, 5 January 1548 and 28 December 1550. This last treaty was for a period of six years that Charles V agreed to extend on 6 June 1555. In August 1566 Ahmad explained to Don Sancho de Leiva the dilemma in which he found himself, "seeing himself in such peril that he dared neither break with the Turks nor detach from them, because if at the moment he did so, the Spaniards, who are his protectors, put an end to the truce, he would very quickly find himself lost, his forces unable to defend himself against so many powers.”

While the Spanish controlled La Goulette and, briefly, Mahdia, the Ottomans were strengthening their position in the south and centre of Tunisia. Dragut took Djerba in 1549, Mahdia in 1554 after its Spanish abandonment, Gafsa in 1556 and Kairouan in 1558.

== Ottoman reconquest and exile ==
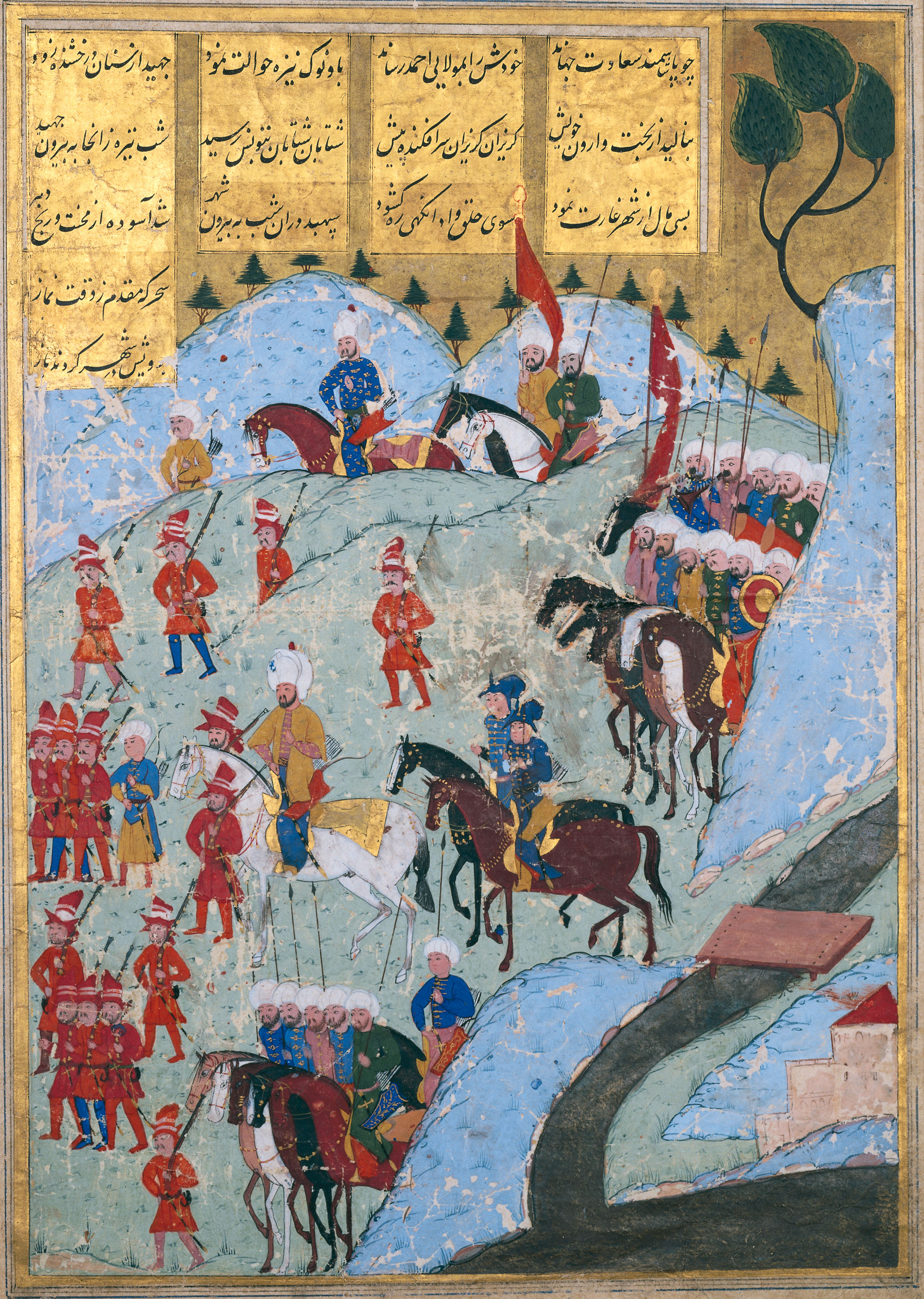
The Ottoman Army Marching On Tunis In 1569

In 1569 the pasha of Algiers Uluç Ali, supported by the Ottoman sultan Selim II, decided to seize Tunis. Faced with this threat, Ahmad approached the Spanish governor of La Goulette, Don Alonso Pimentel for military assistance. However, the governor barely had sufficient forces to defend La Goulette and could not place any troops at his disposal of the sultan. Ahmad’s forces were defeated at skirmishes in Béja and Sidi Ali El Hattab. His troops scattered and he hurriedly sought refuge in the fortress of La Goulette. Uluç Ali entered Tunis without firing a shot in December 1569 but was not able to take La Goulette.

In 1573 a Spanish army under Don John of Austria retook Tunis, but did not restore Ahmad to the throne as he was too unpopular. Instead the Spanish brought his brother Mouley Mohammed from Palermo where he had been in exile, and made him sultan. Ahmad himself went into exile in Palermo with his sons. There he was assigned a pension of 850 escudos a year. He died of the plague at Termini Imerese (Sicily) in 1575.

Ahmad left behind a wife and two sons. He bequeathed one of them, called “el Cojo” (the Lame), most of his fortune (eight thousand of his twelve thousand escudos) because of this son’s desire to return to his homeland and live as a Muslim. The other son, also named Ahmad (Hamida), lived in Naples and wished to be baptized. This angered his father and he reduced his inheritance to only two thousand escudos (the same amount assigned to his mother). In August 1575, a few days after Ahmad’s death, his son was baptised in Naples and took the new name Carlos de Austria, as Don John of Austria was his godfather. On his death in 1601 he bequeathed his estate to the monastery of Santa Maria la Nova in Naples. He had a son, Enrique de Austria, who was born after his father’s conversion and baptized at birth. Enrique lived in Naples on a monthly stipend of 120 escudos that, on his death, passed to his widow Luisa de Austria.

== Portrait ==
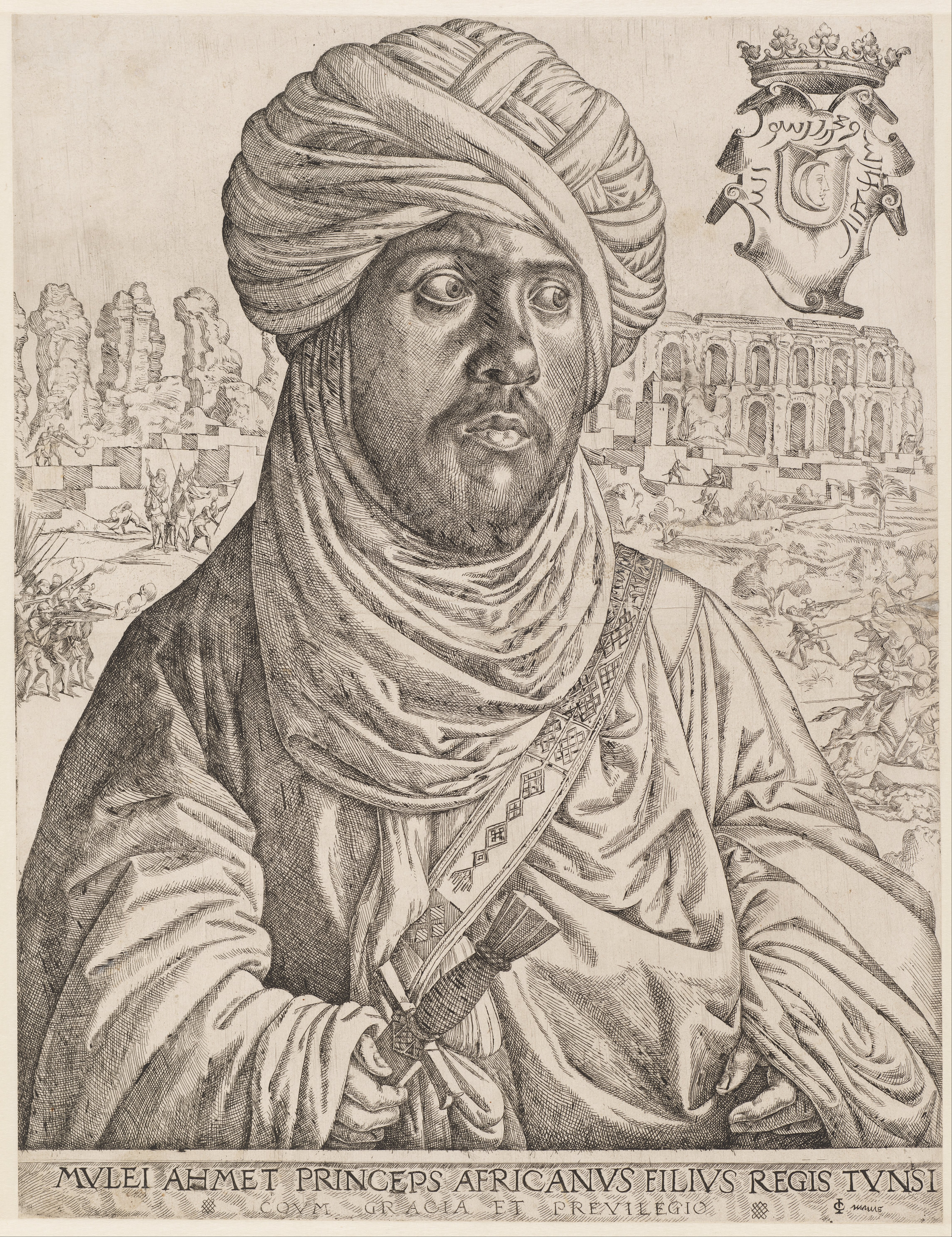
Mulay Ahmad print by Vermeyen

Rubens’ portrait of Moulay Ahmad was executed around 1609, long after the subject’s death. It was based on a portrait by Jan Cornelisz Vermeyen, now lost and known from a print. Rubens’ portrayal is idealized and exotic and it later served as a model for the Balthazar in several of Rubens's depictions of the Adoration of the Magi.

== See also ==
- Capture of Mahdia (1550)
- Conquest of Tunis (1574)
