= Conquest of Tunis (1534) =

Ottoman conquest of Tunis in 1534

Date	1534
Location	Tunis
Result	Ottoman victory

Belligerents
Hafsid dynasty	Ottoman Empire

Commanders and leaders
Muley Hasan	Hayreddin Barbarossa

Strength
Unknown	Unknown

Casualties and losses
Heavy	Unknown

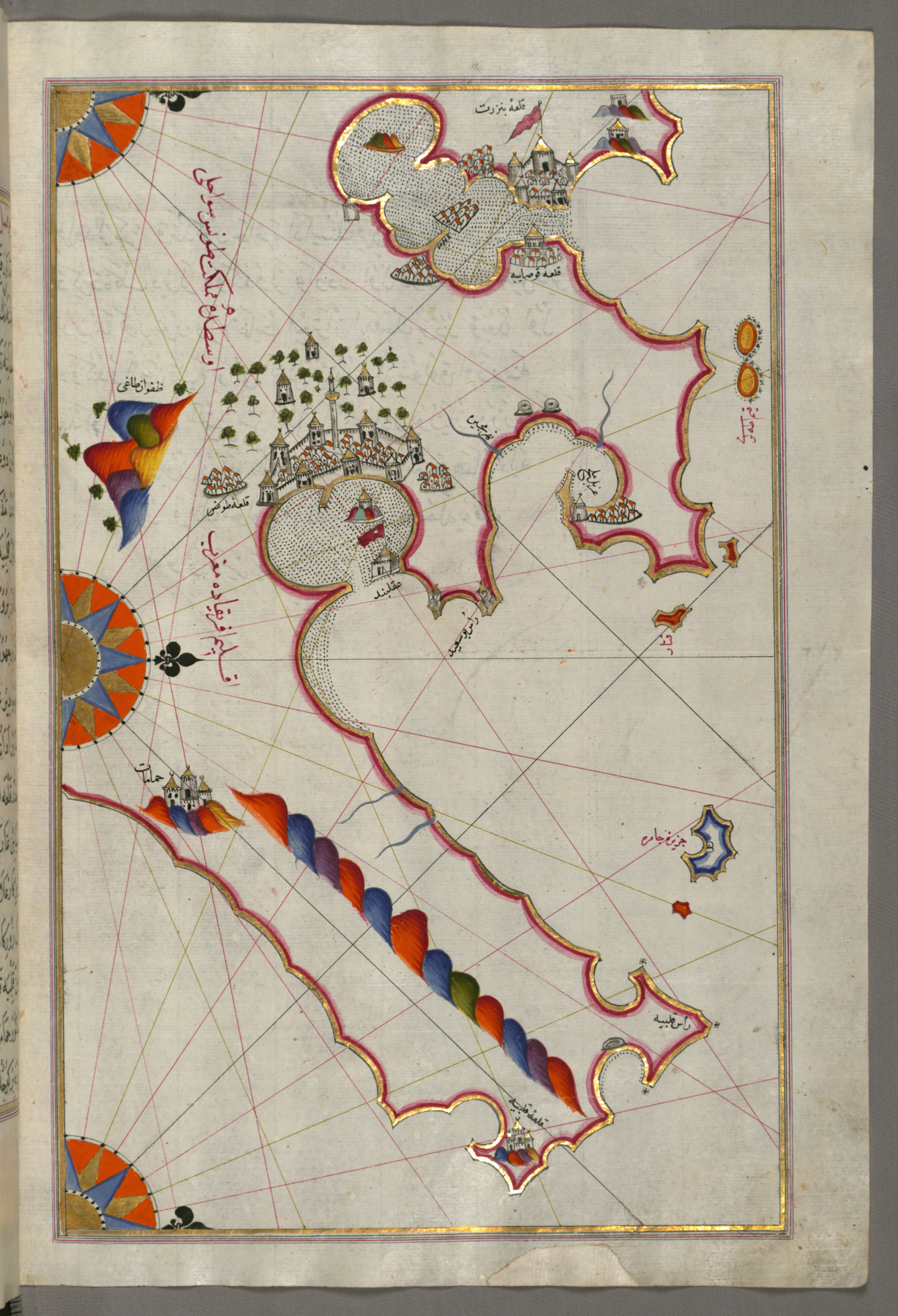
Historic map of Tunis by Piri Reis. The Walters Art Museum

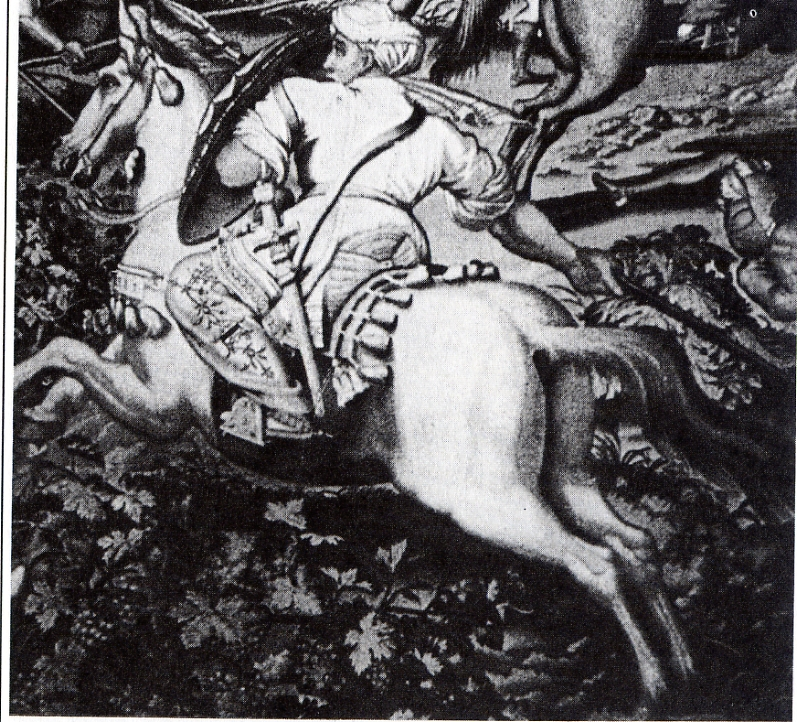
Scene of the battle of Tunis in 1534, showing a Sipahi of the Eyalet of Tunis fighting Spanish. Spanish tapestry from the Alcázar of Seville, 1554.

The conquest of Tunis occurred on 16 August 1534 when Hayreddin Barbarossa captured the city from the Hafsid ruler Muley Hasan.

In 1533, Suleiman the Magnificent ordered Hayreddin Barbarossa, whom he had summoned from Algiers, to build a large war fleet in the arsenal of Constantinople. Altogether 70 galleys were built during the winter of 1533–34, manned by slave oarsmen, including 1,200 Christian ones. With this fleet, Barbarossa conducted aggressive raids along the coast of Italy, until he landed in Tunis on 16 August 1534, ousting the local ruler, theretofore subservient to the Spanish, the Hafsid Regent Muley Hasan.

Barbarossa thus established a strong naval base in Tunis, which could be used for raids in the region, and on nearby Malta. Tunis was a highly strategic location, controlling the passage from the west to the eastern basin of the Mediterranean.

In 1535 however, upon the plea of Muley Hasan, Emperor Charles V mounted a counter-offensive and retook the city in the conquest of Tunis of 1535.
