= Robert Brunschvig =

French historian (1901–1990)

- Born: 6 October 1901; Bordeaux
- Died: 16 February 1990 (aged 88); Paris
- Known for: Professor of Islamic studies and historian

Robert Brunschvig (6 October 1901 – 16 February 1990) was a French historian, orientalist and professor at the University of Paris.

Born in Bordeaux, Brunschvig was educated at the École normale supérieure. After his agrégation, he taught at the Lycée Carnot in Tunis from 1922 to 1930. After a year at the Lycée Montaigne in Paris, he taught at the University of Algiers from 1932 to 1946. He then taught at Bordeaux from 1947 to 1955, and at the Sorbonne until his retirement in 1968.

He was elected a Fellow of the British Academy (FBA) in 1973.
