= Hafsid dynasty =

1229–1574 Sunni Berber dynasty in North Africa

Hafsid dynasty الحفصيون
- 1229–1574
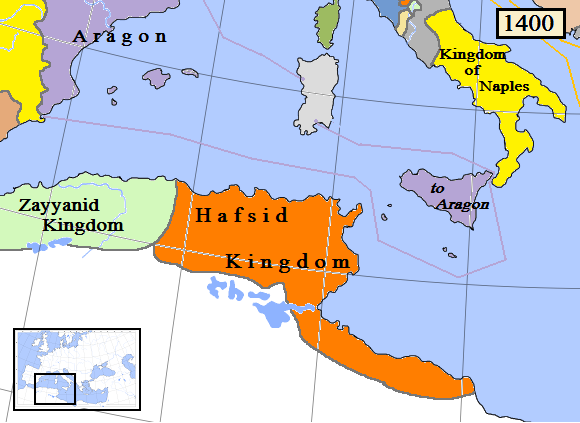
- Realm of the Hafsid dynasty in 1400 (orange)
- Capital: Tunis
- Common languages: Arabic; Berber languages
- Religion: Sunni Islam; (School: Maliki; Creed: Ash’ari); Judaism
- Government: Monarchy
- Sultan and Caliph
  - 1229–1249: Abu Zakariya
  - 1574: Muhammad VI
- History
  - Established: 1229
  - Conquest of Tunis: 1535
  - Ottoman conquest: 1574
- Currency: Gold dinar Silver dirham
Preceded by
Almohad Caliphate
Succeeded by
Ottoman Tunisia
Regency of Algiers
Spanish Tripoli
Kingdom of Kuku
Ottoman Tripolitania
- Today part of: Tunisia; Algeria; Libya

The Hafsid dynasty (Arabic: الحفصيون, romanized: al-Ḥafṣiyūn) was a Sunni Muslim dynasty of Berber descent that ruled Ifriqiya (modern day Tunisia, western Libya, and eastern Algeria) from 1229 to 1574. The dynasty was founded by Abu Zakariya Yahya, who was initially appointed governor of the region by the Almohad caliph before declaring his independence.

Under the reigns of Abu Zakariya and his successor, al-Mustansir (r. 1249–1277), the Hafsids consolidated and expanded their power, with Tunis as their capital. After al-Mustansir's death, internal conflicts resulted in a division between an eastern branch of the dynasty ruling from Tunis and a western branch ruling from Béjaïa and Constantine. A reunification took place under Abu Yahya Abu Bakr II (r. 1318–1346), but his death was followed by another crisis during which the Marinids, based in present-day Morocco, invaded briefly. Eventually, unity was re-established by Abu al-Abbas Ahmad II (r. 1370–1394), who inaugurated the apogee of Hafsid power and influence across the region, which continued under Abu Faris Abd al-Aziz II (r. 1394–1434) and Abu 'Amr 'Uthman (r. 1435–1488). After this, their power gradually declined. During the 16th century, as the Ottoman Empire encroached on the region, the Hafsids were propped up by Spain until the final Ottoman conquest of Tunis in 1574 put an end to their reign.

The Hafsid period in Ifriqiya was also marked by important cultural and intellectual activity, encouraged in part by Abu Zakariya Yahya's decision to welcome Andalusi migrants and refugees. The medieval historian, Ibn Khaldun, was born in Tunis during this time. Hafsid architectural patronage included, among other things, the first madrasas in the Maghreb.

== History ==
=== Almohad Ifriqiya ===
The Hafsids were of Berber descent, although to further legitimize their rule, they claimed Arab ancestry from the second Rashidun caliph Omar. The ancestor of the dynasty (from whom their name is derived), was Abu Hafs Umar ibn Yahya al-Hintati, a Berber from the Hintata tribal confederation, which belonged to the greater Masmuda confederation in present-day Morocco. He was a member of the Council of Ten, one of the highest Almohad political bodies, and a close companion of Ibn Tumart, the Almohad movement's founder.

The son of Abu Hafs, Abu Muhammad Abd al-Wahid ibn Abi Hafs, was appointed by the Almohad caliph Muhammad al-Nasir as governor of Ifriqiya (generally present-day Tunisia, eastern Algeria, and western Libya) where he ruled from 1207 to 1221. He was established in Tunis, which the Almohads had chosen as the province's administrative capital. His appointment came in the wake of the defeat of Yahya Ibn Ghaniya, who had launched a serious attack against Almohad authority in the region. Abu Muhammad Abd al-Wahid was ultimately quite effective in keeping order. The caliph had granted him a significant degree of autonomy in governing, partly to help persuade him to accept this difficult position in the first place. This laid the groundwork for a future Hafsid state.

When Abu Muhammad Abd al-Wahid died in 1221, the Almohad chiefs in Ifriqiya initially elected his son, Abu Zayd Abd al-Rahman, as the next governor. However, the Almohad caliph in Marrakesh, Yusuf II al-Mustansir, had not consented to this and was able to overrule this and appoint his own relative to the position. As Almohad authority weakened over the following years, local opposition to the Almohad governor compelled the Almohad caliph Abdallah al-Adil to appoint another Hafsid family member to the post in 1226. He chose Abu Muhammad Abdallah, a grandson of Abu Hafs. Abu Muhammad Abdallah's brother, Abu Zakariya Yahya, arrived in Tunis before him and began to reestablish order. When al-Ma'mun, the brother of Abdallah al-Adil, rebelled against the latter's authority from al-Andalus, Abu Zakariya sided with him, whereas Abu Muhammad Abdallah remained loyal to the caliph in Marrakesh. Al-Ma'mun's eventual victory resulted in Abu Zakariya being placed in charge of Ifriqiya in 1228.

=== Rise to power ===
A year later, in 1229, al-Ma'mun officially renounced Almohad doctrine. Abu Zakariya used this as a pretext to repudiate his authority and to declare himself independent. By this point, Al-Ma'mun did not have the means to stop him or to reassert control over Ifriqiya. Initially, Abu Zakariya had his name mentioned in the khutba (the sermon during Friday prayer) with the title of amir, but in 1236 or 1237 he began to adopt the caliphal title of Amir al-Mu'minin, in direct challenge to the Almohad caliph in Marrakesh. He also initially organized the state around the Almohad elites, portraying his regime as a continuation of the Almohad system and placing Hafsid family members and Almohad shaykhs (tribal chiefs) in most important positions. He created the post of shaykh al-muwahhidin ('Chief of the Almohads'), often held by a Hafsid family member, who served as the ruler's deputy and to whom all the Almohad chiefs answered.

Abu Zakariya annexed Constantine (Qusantina) and Béjaïa (Bijaya) in 1230. In 1234, he chased Yahya Ibn Ghaniya out of the countryside south of Constantine in 1234, ending this lingering threat. In 1235 he captured Algiers and then established his authority as far as the Chelif River to the west. In the following years he subdued various rural tribes, such as the Hawwara, but allowed some of the Banu Tujin tribes in the central Maghreb to govern themselves as small vassal states that secured his western borders. He welcomed many refugees and immigrants from al-Andalus who were fleeing the advance of the Reconquista. He appointed some of them to important political positions and recruited Andalusi military regiments as a way of counteracting the power and influence of traditional Almohad elites.

For a time, the Nasrid ruler of Granada in al-Andalus, Ibn al-Ahmar, briefly acknowledged Abu Zakariya's suzerainty in an attempt to enlist his help against Christian forces. Ultimately, Hafsid intervention on the Iberian Peninsula was limited to sending a fleet to Muslim Valencia's aid in 1238. Abu Zakariya showed more interest in trying to recreate some of the former authority of the Almohads over the Maghreb and he made attempts to extend his control further west. In 1242, he captured Tlemcen from the Zayyanids, but the Zayyanid leader Yaghmurasan evaded him. The two leaders eventually came to an agreement, with Yaghmurasan continuing to rule in Tlemcen but agreeing to formally recognize Abu Zakariya's authority. That same year, Sijilmasa and Ceuta (Sabta) also recognized his authority, though these would later fall under Marinid control. This policy of western expansion ended with Abu Zakariya's death (1249).

=== Consolidation and division ===
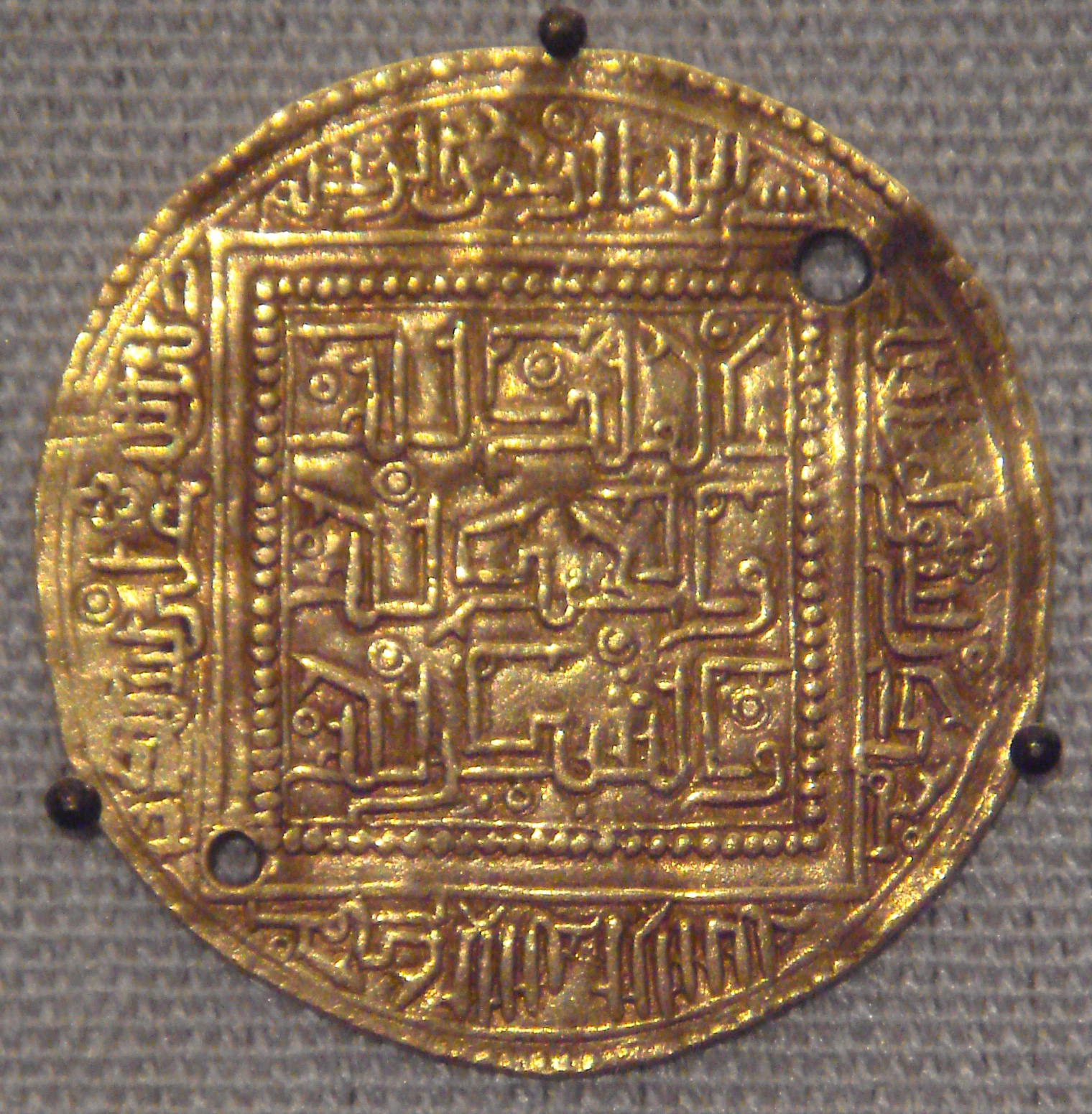
Coin of the Hafsids with ornamental Kufic, from Béjaïa, Algeria, 1249–1276.

His successor, Muhammad I al-Mustansir (r. 1249–1277), focused on consolidating the Hafsid state in Ifriqiya. The state benefited from expanding trade with both Europe and the Sudan region (south of the Sahara). In the western Maghreb (present-day Morocco), the Marinids, who had not yet fully established their rule in the region, formally recognized his authority in 1258. With the fall of Baghdad, the home of the Abbasid caliphs, that same year, the Hafsids were briefly seen as the most important rulers of the Muslim world. The Sharif of Mecca, Abu Numayy, temporarily recognized him as caliph in 1259.

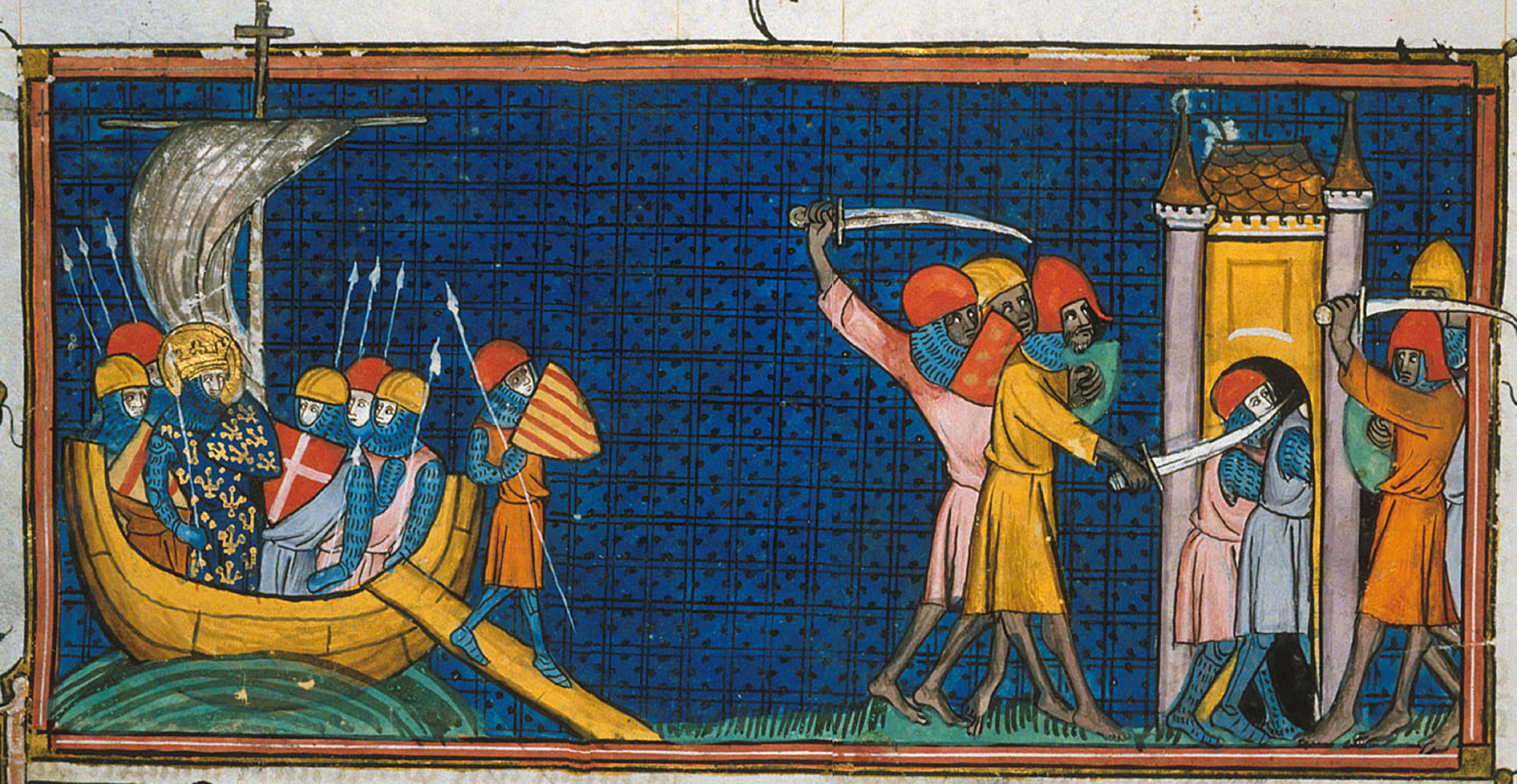
Louis IX of France lands at Tunis in 1270; French soldiers attempting to enter the city are killed by Tunisian soldiers. (Grandes Chroniques de France)

It was during his reign that the failed Eighth Crusade took place, led by Louis IX of France. After landing at Carthage, Louis died of dysentery in the middle of his army decimated by disease in 1270.

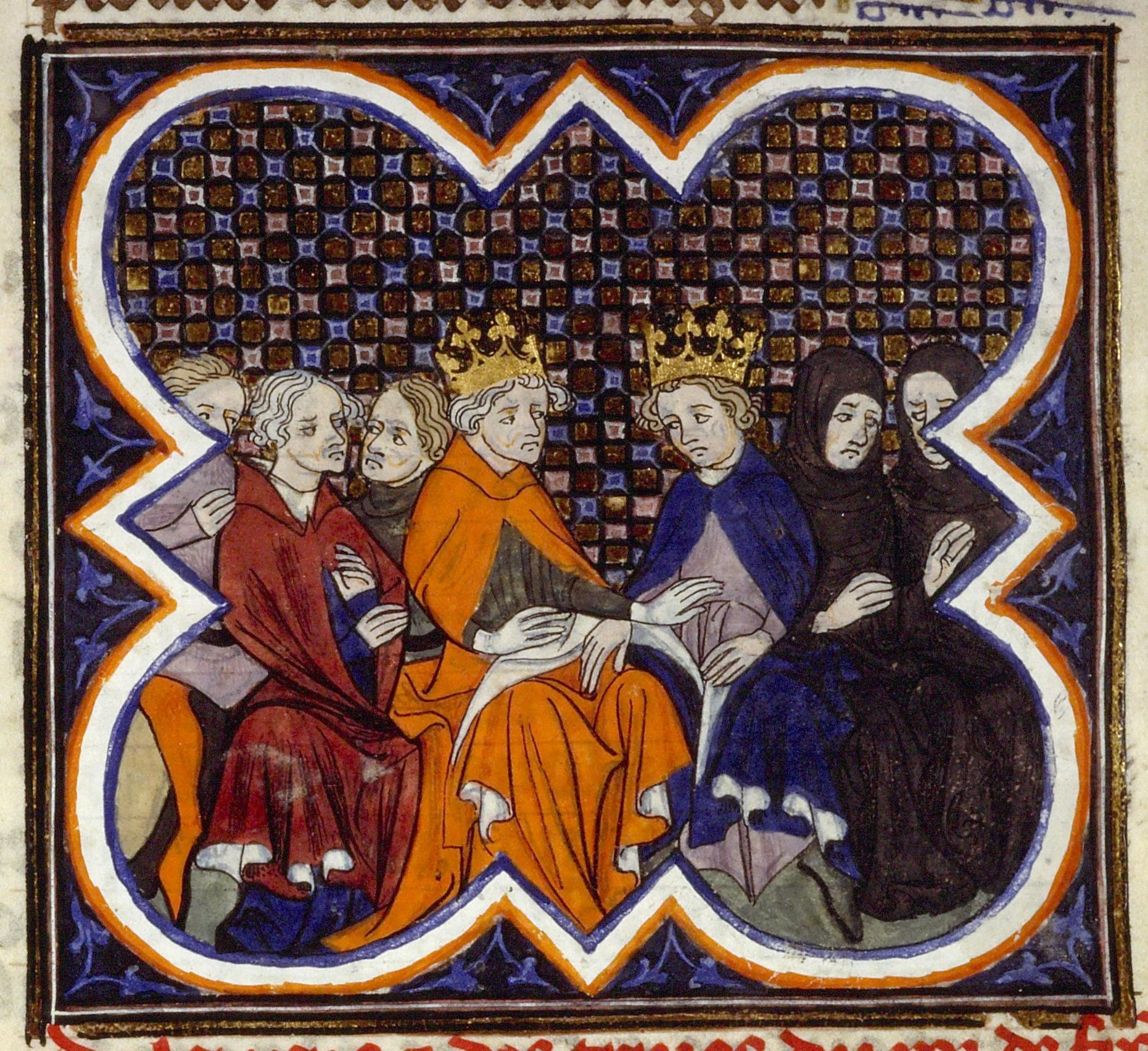
Philip III of France concludes the Treaty of Tunis with Hafsid sultan Muhammad I al-Mustansir. (1270)

After al-Mustansir's death in 1277, the Hafsids were riven by internal conflict, aggravated by interference from Aragon. This resulted in a split in the dynasty: one branch ruled from Tunis in the east and another branch ruled from Béjaïa (Bijaya) and Constantine (Qusantina) in the west. This division continued to characterize Hafsid politics for much of its history, with the balance of power sometimes shifting from one side to another and with intermittent successes at unifying both branches under one rule. After the initial split, the first successful reunification took place under Abu Yahya Abu Bakr II (r. 1318–1346), the ruler of the western branch who managed to take control of Tunis.

From around the end of the 13th century onward, the Hafsids could no longer rely on the Almohad legacy to legitimize their rule. Over the course of the 13th century, the incorporation of Andalusi migrants into both the state and the army, as well as the employ of European Christian mercenaries, left the old Almohad elites as a smaller faction within the ruling system who caused instability rather than providing it. Abu Yahya Abu Bakr II's predecessor in Tunis, Abu Zakariya Ibn al-Lihyani (r. 1311–1317), signalled a further break with the Almohad past by having the name of Ibn Tumart (the Almohad founding figure) dropped from the Friday khutba.

=== Marinid invasions and internal crisis ===
Abu Yahya Abu Bakr's rule remained unstable and he resorted to making alliances with the Zayyanids and Marinids to the west. His agreement with the Marinid ruler, Abu al-Hasan (r. 1331–1348), included a marriage to his sister, who subsequently died during a failed Marinid expedition in Spain, followed by another marriage to his daughter. When Abu Yahya Abu Bakr died in 1346, his intended heir, Abu'l Abbas, was killed in Tunis by his brother, Umar, who seized power. Abu'l Abbas's chamberlain, Abu Muhammad Abdallah ibn Tafrajin, sent a letter to Abu al-Hasan urging him to intervene and invade Ifriqiya. Abu al-Hasan, having already conquered Tlemcen in 1337, seized the opportunity to further expand. He conquered Tunis in 1347 and the Hafsid governors in the region accepted his authority.

The invasion, however, disturbed the balance of power in favour of the Bedouin Arab tribes, whom the Marinids were unable to sway. Ibn Tafrajin, who had hoped to be placed in power by the Marinids, fled to Egypt. The situation in Ifriqiya devolved into further disorder and internal rivalries, and Abu al-Hasan was forced to return west in 1349, partly to deal with a coup d'état by his son, Abu Inan. Ibn Tafrajin returned to Ifriqiya and, with Bedouin support, installed another young son of Abu Yahya Abu Bakr, Abu Ishaq, as ruler. Abu Inan, having successfully taken the throne from his father, invaded Ifriqiya again and captured Tunis in August 1357, but he was soon forced by his own troops to abandon the region. He returned west, retaining control only of Constantine and the cities of the central Maghreb for a time.

During the mid-14th century, plague epidemics brought to Ifriqiya from Sicily caused a considerable fall in population, further weakening the Hafsid realm. To stop raids from southern tribes during plague epidemics, the Hafsids turned to the Banu Hilal to protect their rural population.

=== Apogee ===
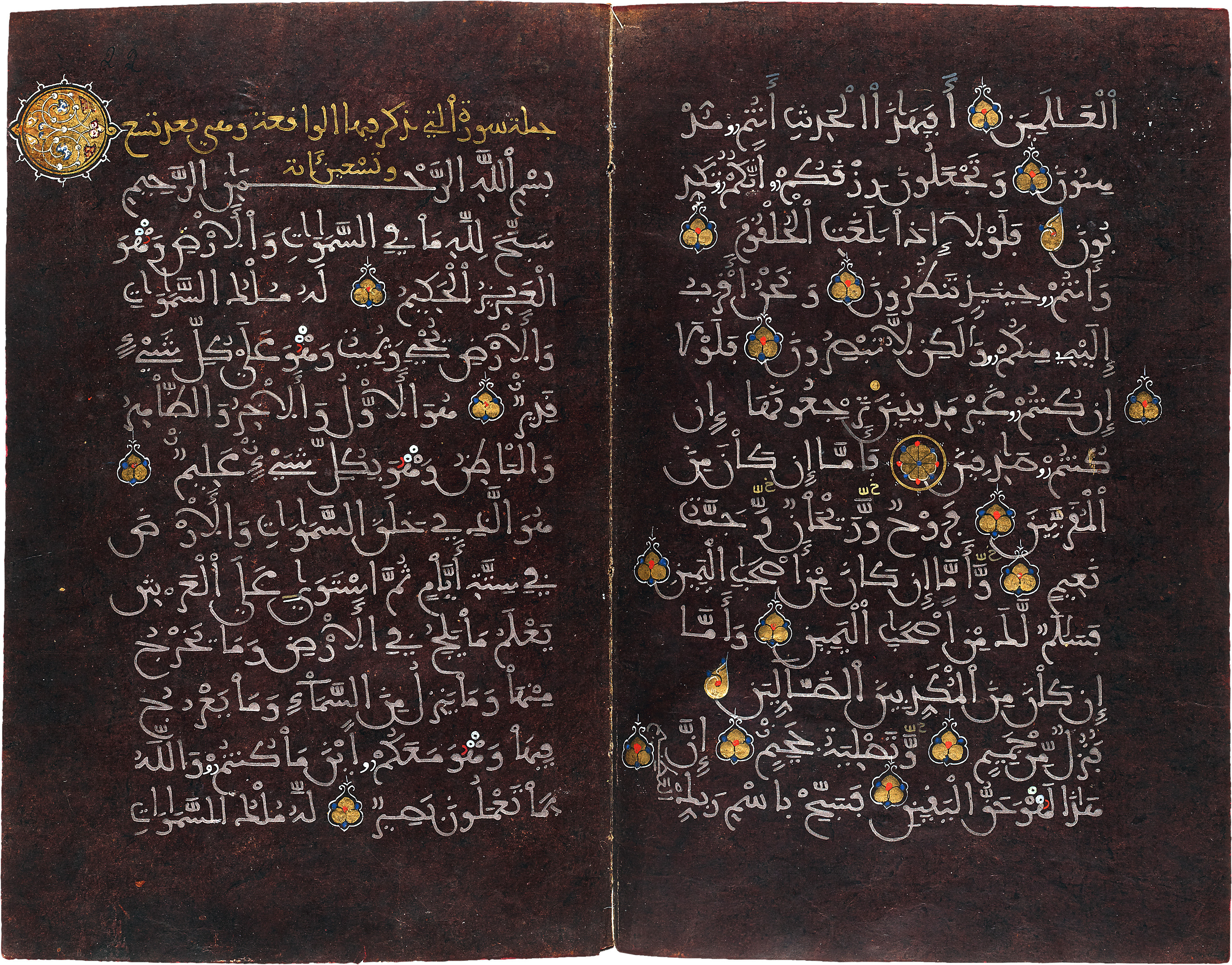
Double page from the Qur'an manuscript endowed to the Kasbah Mosque by sultan Abu Faris Abd al-Aziz II in March 1405. Bibliothèque nationale de France.

After the Marinid threat ended, attempts to reunify the Hafsids failed until Abu al-Abbas Ahmad II (r. 1370–1394), the emir of Béjaïa and Constantine, conquered Tunis in 1370. A capable ruler and military leader, he reestablished Hafsid authority on stronger terms, centralizing power to a greater extent than ever before. Meanwhile, the Zayyanids and Marinids were occupied by internal matters. The Almohad-based institutions of the state, such as the office of shaykh al-muwahhidin, also lost any remaining importance after this time.

Abu Faris Abd al-Aziz II's reign (r. 1394–1434) was considered the apogee of Hafsid power and prosperity by contemporary writers. He further consolidated his dynasty's power in Ifriqiya and extended his influence over the Zayyanids and Marinids (and the Wattasids who succeeded the latter).

The beginning of his reign was not easy since the cities of the south revolted against him. However, the new sultan quickly regained control: he reoccupied Tozeur (1404), Gafsa (1401), and Biskra (1402), subdued tribal power in the regions of Constantine and Béjaïa (1397–1402), and appointed governors of these regions to be elected officers. He also intervened against his western and eastern neighbors. He annexed Tripoli (1401) and Algiers (1410–1411). In 1424, he defeated the Zayyanid sultan, Abu Malik Abd al-Wahid, and placed another Zayyanid, Abu Abdallah Muhammad IV, on the throne of Tlemcen as his vassal. In 1428, the latter became embroiled in another war with Abu Malik Abd al-Wahid – who had now won his own support from the Hafsids – and was eventually replaced by yet another Zayyanid relative with Abu Faris Abd al-Aziz's help in 1431. Around the same time (probably in 1426), Abu Faris Abd al-Aziz also helped to install Abd al-Haqq II on the Marinid throne in Fez – under the regency of Abu Zakariya Yahya al-Wattasi – and thus obtained from him a recognition of Hafsid suzerainty.

In 1429, the Hafsids attacked the island of Malta and took 3000 slaves, although they did not conquer the island. Kaid Ridavan was the military leader during the attack. The profits were used for a great building programme and to support art and culture. However, piracy also provoked retaliation from the Christians, which several times launched attacks and crusades against Hafsid coastal cities such as the Barbary crusade (1390), the Bona crusade (1399) and the capture of Djerba in 1423.

Abu Faris Abd al-Aziz II died in 1434 during another expedition against Tlemcen. His successor, Abu 'Amr 'Uthman, had the longest reign of any Hafsid (r. 1435–1488). He largely continued the strong rule of his predecessors, but he had to contend with greater challenges, including internal politics, restive Bedouin tribes in the south, and the Wattasids in the west.

Uthman conquered Tripolitania in 1458 and appointed a governor in Ouargla in 1463. He led two expeditions to Tlemcen in 1462 and 1466 and made the Zayyanids his vassals, while the Wattasid state in Morocco also formally accepted his authority. The entire Maghreb was thus briefly under Hafsid suzerainty.

=== Fall ===
In the 16th century, the Hafsids became increasingly caught up in the power struggle between Spain and the Ottoman Empire-supported Corsairs. The Ottomans conquered Tunis in 1534 and held it for one year, driving out the Hafsid ruler Moulay Hassan. A year later the King of Spain and Holy Roman Emperor Charles V seized Tunis, drove the Ottomans out and restored Muley Hassan as a Habsburg tributary. Due to the Ottoman threat, the Hafsids were vassals of Spain after 1535. The Ottomans again conquered Tunis in 1569 and held it for four years. Don Juan of Austria recaptured it in 1573. The Ottomans reconquered Tunis in 1574, and Muhammad VI, the last Caliph of the Hafsids, was brought to Constantinople and was subsequently executed due to his collaboration with Spain and the desire of the Ottoman Sultan to take the title of Caliph as he now controlled Mecca and Medina.

== Society ==
=== Demographic developments ===
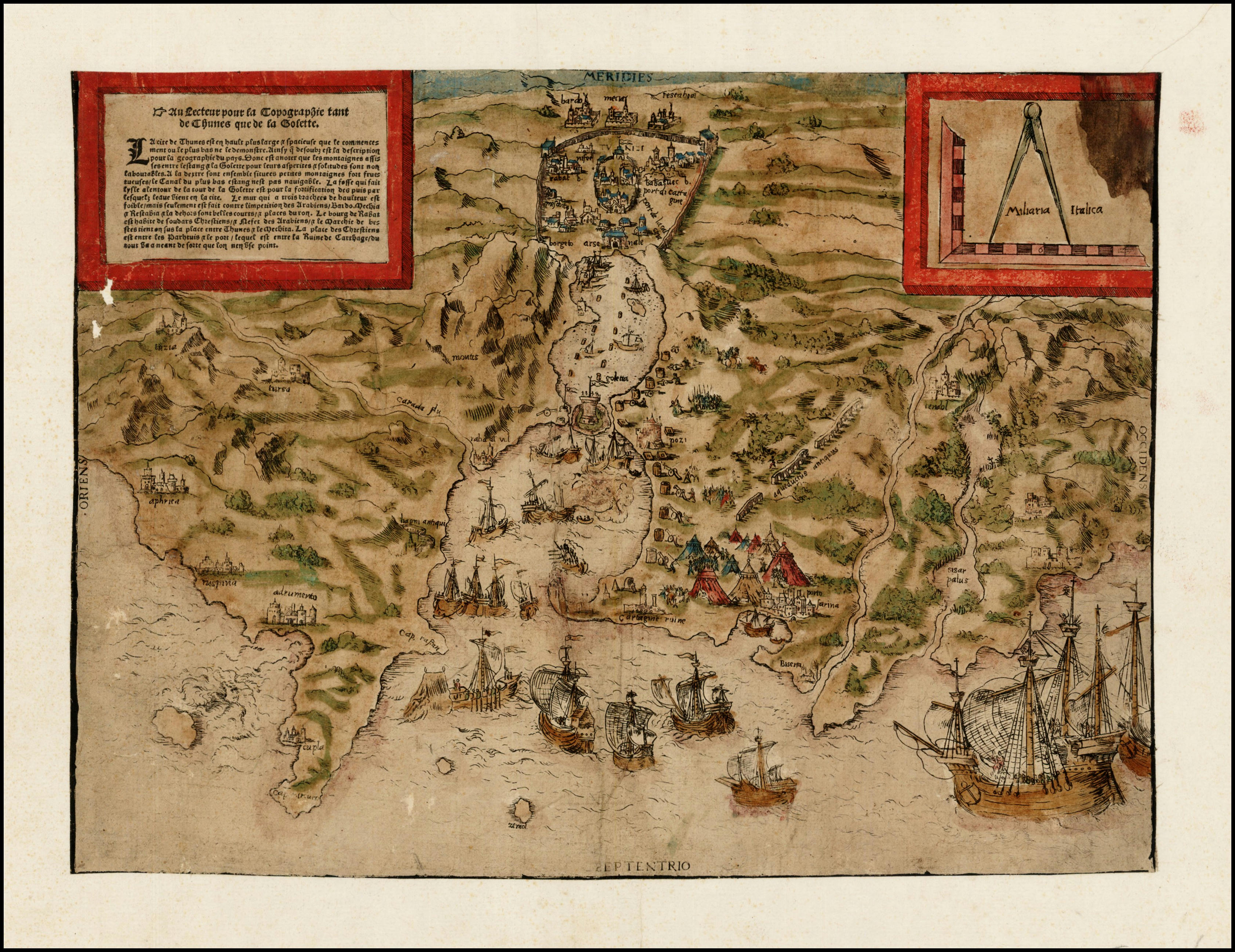
View of Tunis c. 1560 (Agostino Veneziano)

The demographics of Ifriqiya changed considerably during the Hafsid period and in the period leading up to it. The large-scale influx of Arab Bedouin tribes into the countryside during the preceding centuries promoted the Arabization of Ifriqiya. Aside from some relatively isolated region such as Djerba and the Nafusa Mountains, where Berber languages continued to be spoken, nearly all of Ifriqiya became fully Arabized during this era. Additionally, and perhaps also due in part to the Bedouin migrations, the urban population became concentrated along coastal cities instead of inland towns, though major oases and inland centres like Kairouan and Constantine remained significant. By the mid-14th century, the population of Tunis had grown to 100,000, making it one of the largest cities in the world at the time.

Andalusi migrants and refugees, who fled the advance of the Christian conquests in the Iberian Peninsula, became an important element of the urban population. These migrants were culturally Arab and followed the Maliki legal school (maddhhab) of Sunni Islam. The Hafsids relied upon them heavily as scribes, bureaucrats, and other government officials.

=== Religion ===
The Hafsid rulers continued to follow Almohad doctrine initially, at least officially, but Almohadism was not widely followed among the rest of the population. The Hafsids tolerated the activities of Sunni islamic scholars (ulama) from the regionally dominant Maliki school and eventually, during the 14th century, these scholars came to occupy most religious offices in the state. Tunis also replaced Kairouan, the former traditional capital of Ifriqiya, as the main center of religious scholarship. Ibn 'Arafa, who served as the imam of the Zaytuna Mosque in Tunis from 1355 to 1401, was one of main figures in this Maliki revival. In turn, the Malikis provided support to the Hafsid resurgence in the later 14th century.

Among other things, the Malikis served as a counterweight to the growing influence of Sufi saints. Cults based around these saints had grown in importance across the country, especially in the countryside and among the Arab tribes there. The Hafsids remained wary of this trend, which undermined centralized authority, and thus allied with the more urban Maliki scholars. Nonetheless, Sufism grew into one of the most important aspects of Islam in the region, with zawiyas (Sufi religious complexes) founded in many locations, sometimes under the protection of local tribes, and reached some level of accommodation with central authorities.

=== Non-Muslims ===
Under Almohad rule, Jews were treated poorly, and their communities nearly disappeared. Under the Hafsids, a policy of tolerance returned and allowed their communities to recover. Jews were prominent as merchants, moneylenders, and craftsmen. The recovery was also aided by the arrival of Jewish refugees fleeing persecution on the Iberian Peninsula, particularly after their 1492 expulsion from Spain. Jews elected a leader who represented them before the sultan and were allowed to govern themselves according to rabbinical law, though Islamic law and tribunals still had priority where relevant.

What was left of indigenous Christianity in Ifriqiya had disappeared in the 13th century under Almohad rule. In contrast again with the Almohads, the Hafsids showed a marked toleration for Christianity, in part because they sought commercial ties with European Christian states, who saw this toleration as a requisite for normal relations. Treaties were struck with individual states that also laid out the conditions under which Christians lived in Hafsid domains. These included rights, such as diplomatic representation by a consul, as well as restrictions, such as prohibiting merchants from bringing their spouses to live with them. Most of these Christians were merchants from countries around the Mediterranean such as Catalonia, southern France, and the maritime republics of Italy.

Starting sometime in Abu Zakariya's reign (r. 1229–1249), Catalonian Christian mercenaries were brought into the service of the Hafsid army as a result of Hafsid relations with the Kingdom of Aragon. The king of Aragon retained some formal authority over this mercenary corps, while other European Christians joined its ranks over time. Aragonese subjects had a dedicated fondouk, a compound that provided lodging and services, in both Tunis and Béjaïa. By the 15th century, the descendants of these and other mercenaries continued to form the ruler's personal guard but had assimilated to Arab culture.

== Economy ==
The Hafsids, with their location in Ifriqiya, was rich in agriculture and trade. Instead of placing the capital at inland cities such as Kairouan, Tunis was chosen as the capital due to its position on the coast as a port linking the Western and Eastern Mediterranean. Christian merchants from Europe were given their own enclaves in various cities on the Mediterranean coast, promoting trans-Mediterranean trade. Under the Hafsids, commerce and diplomatic relations with Christian Europe grew significantly, however piracy against Christian shipping grew as well, particularly during the rule of Abd al-Aziz II (1394–1434). The Hafsids also had a large stake in trans-Saharan trade through the caravan routes from Tunis to Timbuktu and from Tripoli to sub-Saharan Africa.

== Culture ==
=== Intellectual activity ===
The Hafsids were effective patrons of culture and education. They were the first to introduce madrasas to the Maghreb. Arabic literacy and religious education thus increased, with Kairouan, Tunis and Bijaya hosting famous university-mosques. Kairouan continued to serve as a center of the Maliki school of religious doctrine.As the political center of the country shifted to Tunis, the Great Mosque of al-Zaytuna, the city's main mosque, became the country's leading center of learning. Of great impact on culture were immigrants from al-Andalus, whom Abu Zakariya encouraged to come to his realm in the 13th century. Among the most important figures was the historian and intellectual, Ibn Khaldun, born in Tunis and of Andalusi descent.

=== Architecture ===
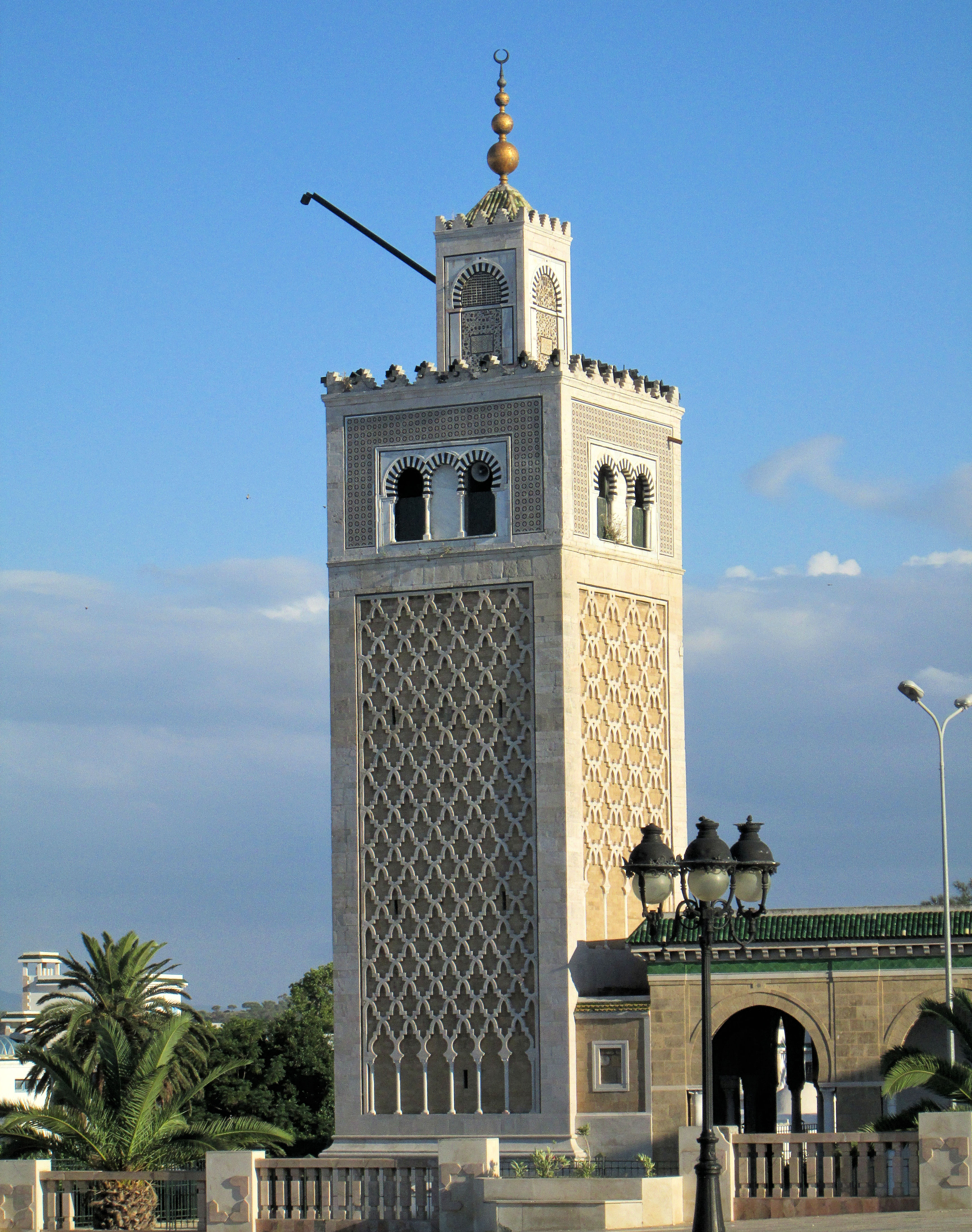
The minaret of the Kasbah Mosque of Tunis, built at the beginning of the Hafsid period in the early 1230s

The Hafsids were significant builders, particularly under the reigns of successful leaders like Abu Zakariya (r. 1229–1249) and Abu Faris (r. 1394–1434), though not many of their monuments have survived intact to the present-day. While Kairouan remained an important religious center, Tunis was the capital and progressively replaced it as the main city of the region and the main center of architectural patronage. Unlike the architecture further west, Hafsid architecture was built primarily in stone (rather than brick or mudbrick) and appears to have featured much less decoration. In reviewing the history of architecture in the western Islamic world, scholar Jonathan Bloom remarks that Hafsid architecture seems to have "largely charted a course independent of the developments elsewhere in the Maghrib."

The Kasbah Mosque of Tunis was one of the first works of this period, built by Abu Zakariya (the first independent Hafsid ruler) at the beginning of his reign. Its floor plan had noticeable differences from previous Almohad-period mosques but the minaret, completed in 1233, bears very strong resemblance to the minaret of the earlier Almohad Kasbah Mosque in Marrakesh. Other foundations from the Hafsid period in Tunis include the Haliq Mosque (13th century) and the al-Hawa Mosque (1375). The Bardo Palace (today a national museum) was also begun by the Hafsids in the 15th century, and is mentioned in historical records for the first time during the reign of Abu Faris. The Hafsids also made significant renovations to the much older Great Mosque of Kairouan – renovating its ceiling, reinforcing its walls, and building or rebuilding two of its entrance gates in 1293 – as well as to the Great Mosque of al-Zaytuna in Tunis.

The Hafsids also introduced the first madrasas to the region, beginning with the Madrasa al-Shamma῾iyya built in Tunis in 1238 (or in 1249 according to some sources). This was followed by many others (almost all of them in Tunis) such as the Madrasa al-Hawa founded in the 1250s, the Madrasa al-Ma'ridiya (1282), and the Madrasa al-Unqiya (1341). Many of these early madrasas, however, have been poorly preserved or have been considerably modified in the centuries since their foundation. The Madrasa al-Muntasiriya, completed in 1437, is among the best preserved madrasas of the Hafsid period.

== Flags ==
According to French historian Robert Brunschvig, the Hafsid dynasty and its founding tribe, Hintata, were represented specifically with a white flag; he states : "Among the Hafsid standards carried in the parades stood out, apart, closer to the sultan and held by a man on horseback, a white standard, the "victorious standard" (al-alam al-mansûr). It is with good reason that some wanted to find in this white standard that of the Almohads, of the same color, reproducing in turn that which the Fatimids had adopted." Egyptian historiographer Al-Qalqashandi (d. 1418) mentioned white flags when he spoke about the Almohad flag in Tunisia, where he stated that: "It was a white flag called the victorious flag, and it was raised before their sultan when riding for Eid prayers or for the movement of the makhzen slaves (which were the ordinary people of the country and the people of the markets)." Historian Charles-André Julien also speaks of Hafsid sovereigns doing parades with their court while hoisting their own white standard, overshadowing multicolored flags of embroidered silk.

The Book of Knowledge of All Kingdoms, written by a Franciscan friar in the 14th century, describes the flag of Tunis as being white with a black moon at its center. Other cities within modern Tunisia and eastern Algeria were also reported having white flags with a moon.

Flags of Hafsids on portolans and from other sources

Early red flag with white or yellow crescent of the 14th century, reported by Marino Sanudo (ca. 1321), Pietro Vesconte (1325), Angelino Dulcerta (1339) and the Catalan Atlas (1385)

White with blue crescent according to Jacobo Russo, 1550 (last period of the kingdom)

== Hafsid rulers ==
S. n.	Name	Birth date	Death date	Reign	Notes
–	Abu Muhammad Abd al-Wahid ibn Abi Hafs	unknown	1222	1207–1222	Not yet a sultan, just a local minor leader.
–	Abu Muhammad Abd Allah ibn Abd al-Wahid	unknown	1229	1222–1229	Not yet a sultan, just a local minor leader.
1st	Abu Zakariya Yahya	1203	5 October 1249	1229–1249	
2nd	Muhammad I al-Mustansir	1228	1277	1249–1277	
3rd	Yahya II al-Wathiq	1249	1279	1277–1279	
4th	Ibrahim I	1234	1283	1279–1283	
5th	Abd al-Aziz I	unknown	1283	1283	
6th	Ibn Abi Umara	unknown	1284	1283–1284	
7th	Abu Hafs Umar bin Yahya	1245	1295	1284–1295	
8th	Abu Asida Muhammad II	1279	September 1309	1295–1309	
9th	Abu Yahya Abu Bakr ash-Shahid	unknown	September 1309	1309	
10th	Abu-l-Baqa Khalid An-Nasr	c.1283	1311	1309–1311	
11th	Abd al-Wahid Zakariya ibn al-Lihyani	1253	1326	1311–1317	
12th	Abu Darba Muhammad Al-Mustansir	1274	1323	1317–1318	
13th	Abu Yahya Abu Bakr II	1293	19 October 1346	1318–1346	
14th	Abu-l Abbas Ahmad	unknown	1346	1346	
15th	Abu Hafs Umar II	unknown	1347	1346–1347	
16th	Abu al-Abbas Ahmad al-Fadl al-Mutawakkil	unknown	1350	1347–1350	
17th	Abu Ishaq Ibrahim II	October or November 1336	19 February 1369	1350–1369	
18th	Abu-l-Baqa Khalid II	unknown	November 1370	1369–1370	
19th	Ahmad II	1329	3 June 1394	1370–1394	
20th	Abd al-Aziz II	1361	July 1434	1394–1434	
21st	Abu Abd-Allah Muhammad al-Muntasir	unknown	16 September 1435	1434–1435	
22nd	Abu 'Amr 'Uthman	February 1419	September 1488	1435–1488	
23rd	Abu Zakariya Yahya II	unknown	1489	1488–1489	
24th	Abd al-Mu'min	unknown	1490	1489–1490	
25th	Abu Yahya Zakariya III	unknown	1494	1490–1494	
26th	Abu Abdallah Muhammad IV al-Mutawakkil	unknown	1526	1494–1526	
27th	Muhammad V (“Moulay Hasan”)	unknown	1543	1526–1543	
28th	Ahmad III	c. 1500	August 1575	1543–1569	
Ottoman conquest (1569–1573)
29th	Muhammad VI	unknown	1594	1573–1574	

== See also ==
- Banu Thabit
- List of Sunni Muslim dynasties
