= Abu Abdallah Muhammad V al-Hasan =

Hafsid sultan of Tunis from 1526 to 1543

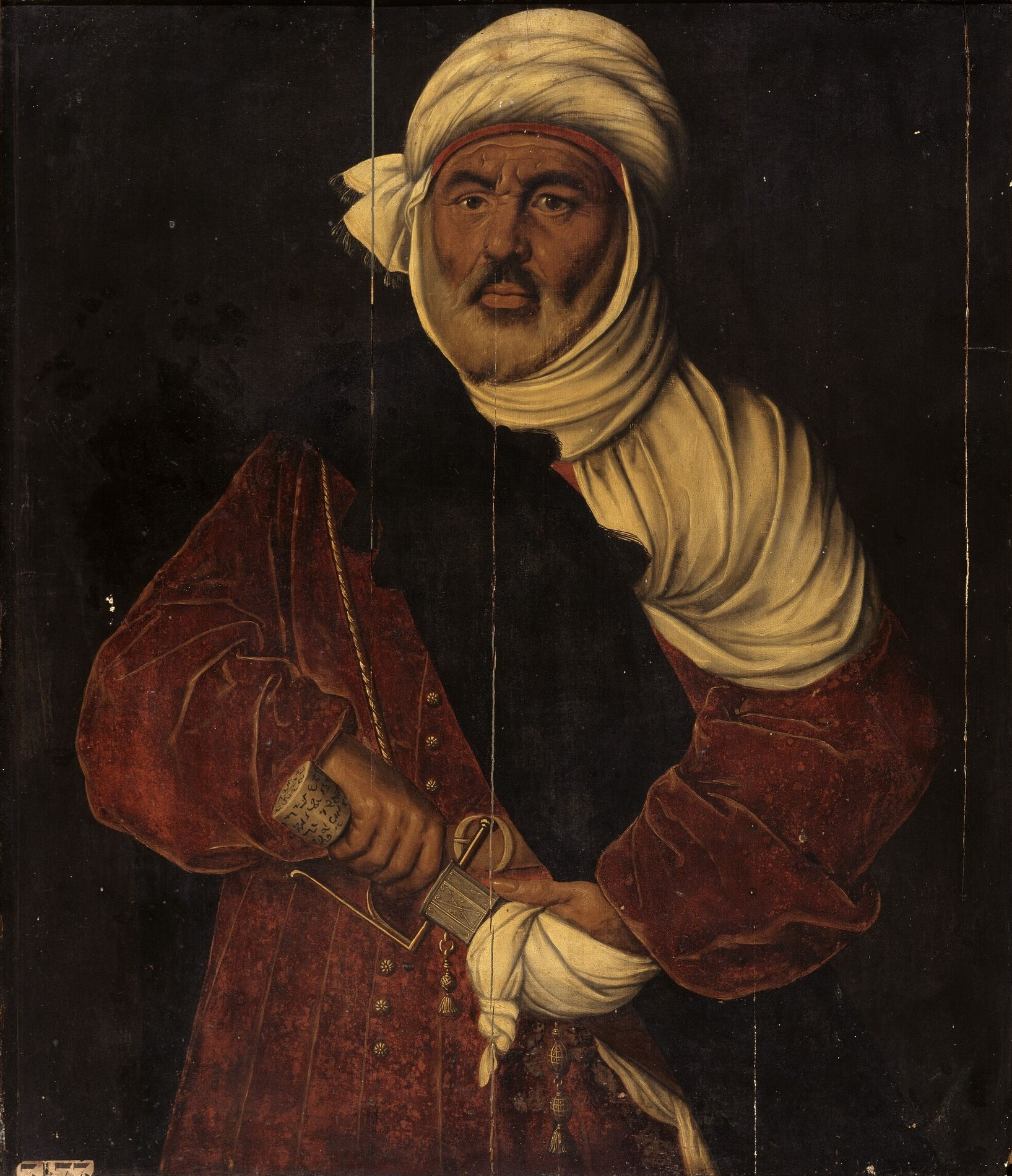

Caliph of the Hafsid Sultanate
- Reign: 1526–1543
- Predecessor: Abu Abdallah Muhammad IV al-Mutawakkil
- Successor: Abu al-Abbas Ahmad III
- Died: 1549; Hafsid Sultanate
- Dynasty: Hafsids
- Religion: Islam

Abu Abdallah Muhammad V al-Hasan (Arabic: أبو عبد الله محمد الحسن), often called “Moulay Hasan” and sometimes “Muleasses” in 16th century writings, was the Hafsid caliph of Tunis from 1526 to 1543.

== Succession struggles ==
His father Abu Abdallah Muhammad IV al-Mutawakkil had originally intended for his oldest son to succeed him, but his wife prevailed on him to name Abu Abdallah Muhammad instead. As soon as he assumed power, Abu Abdallah Muhammad had most of his brothers and other family members executed, although his brother Rashid was able to flee to Algiers where he took refuge with Hayreddin Barbarossa. In 1531 Abu Abdallah Muhammad sent an embassy to Suleiman the Magnificent in an attempt to secure Ottoman support against Hayreddin Barbarossa, but it did not meet with a friendly reception and the Ottoman ruler promptly directed Hayreddin to take Tunis.

== Invasion of 1534 ==
On August 19, 1534, Barbarossa anchored off La Goulette with a fleet and announced that he had come to restore Rashid to the throne. As soon as the people of Tunis learned of this news, they stormed the palaces of Abu Abdallah Muhammad who barely had time to flee. A delegation of notables then went to La Goulette to receive Rashid but Barbarossa landed 9,000 men, seized the Kasbah and proclaimed Suleiman the Magnificent as rightful ruler of Tunis.

Abu Abdallah Muhammad then sought assistance from Emperor Charles V to regain his throne. Charles, fearing increased Corsair attacks on the coasts of Spain and Italy, equipped a fleet of 400 vessels under Andrea Doria to retake Tunis and led the campaign himself.

== Invasion of 1535 and dependency on Spain ==
The Christian force succeeded in driving Hayreddin out and he fled back to Algiers. Abu Abdallah Muhammad was restored to the throne. He was obliged to sign a treaty, dated 5 August 1535, acknowledging that he held his crown as a vassal of Spain, and agreeing to pay for the cost of a Spanish garrison in La Goulette as well as regular tribute.

In 1537 a number of Tunisian cities, including Sousse and Kairouan rebelled against Abu Abdallah Muhammad. A fresh appeal to Charles V brought a force from Sicily which was not however successful in defeating the rebellion. In 1539 a new fleet under Andrea Doria restored a number of rebel towns to the caliph's rule, including Kelibia, Sfax, Sousse and Monastir, where a Spanish garrison was left. As soon as that garrison was withdrawn in 1540, the coastal towns revolted again, and this time they placed themselves under the protection of Dragut.

== Overthrow and exile ==
In 1542 Abu Abdallah Muhammad set sail for Italy, intending to gather weapons and munitions. During his absence his son Ahmad rebelled, declaring that his father was intending to become a Christian and hand the country over to the Spanish. Abu Abdallah Muhammad returned to Tunis in the company of a mercenary, Giovanni Battista Loffredo, but he was captured by Ahmad. Given the choice between execution and blinding, he opted for blinding and went into exile.

After spending several years in Naples and Sicily, in 1548 Abu Abdallah Muhammad travelled to Augsburg to meet Charles V and he was also received by Pope Paul III. He died while on a new expedition with Andrea Doria to take Mahdia in 1549.

== Legacy ==
Because of his colourful life, his links to Christian rulers and his time in exile in Europe, Abu Abdallah Muhammad was well known to European historians of his own time and following periods. Various anecdotes were recounted about him, many apocryphal, emphasising his moral failings. His life was described in works such as The General History of the Turks by Richard Knolles, which described him as “a man of insatiable Covetousness, unstaied Lust, horrible Cruelty, hated both of God and Man; who having by Treachery slain eighteen of his Brethren, or that which worse is, cruelly burnt out their Eyes, doth so reign alone, that he hath left him neither Kinsman nor Friend.”

Knolles also translated another work that mentioned him, The six bookes of a common-weale by Jean Bodin who asked: “And why in our time was Muleasses thrust out of his kingdome, and so lost his estate, but for intemperance? and yet neverthelesse was so drowned in delights, as that returning out of Germanie, without hope that the emperour Charles the fift[h] (in whom his greatest trust was) would afford him any aid, and banished as he was out of his kingdom, yet spent he an hundred crowns upon the dressing of one peacock, as Paulus Ioui∣us reporteth... yet such was the judgement of God upon him, as that by the commaundement of his sonnes he had his eyes put out with an hot barre of Iron, by little and little drying up the humors of them, and deprived of his kingdome also.”

In 1607 or 1608 a play was produced in London, written by John Mason with the title An Excellent Tragedy of Mulleasses the Turke, and Borgias Governour of Florence. The eponymous character may have been created drawing from the characteristics said to have been possessed by the historical Abu Abdallah Muhammad, but the plot bears no relationship to his life.

There is a painted portrait of “Muleasses the Turk” by a 17th-century Italian artist, which identifies him as “king of Tunis”.
