= Chelif River campaign =

Chelif River Campaign
- Part of Campaigns of Abu Zakariya Yahya
- Map of Chelif River
Date	1235
Location	Chelif River , Algeria
Result	Hafsid victory

Belligerents
Banu Mandil; Banu Tudjin	Hafsid dynasty

Commanders and leaders
Abd al-Qawi (POW)	Abu Zakariya Yahya

Strength
Unknown	Unknown

Casualties and losses
Unknown	Unknown

The Chelif River campaign took place in 1235 and was part of the military expeditions of the first Hafsid caliph, Abu Zakariya Yahya. It was fought between his army and the tribes of the valley, including the Banu Tujin and the Banu Mandil. The campaign ended with the annexation of the Chelif River valley, opening access to the route towards Morocco.

== Background ==
The Banu Tujin and Banu Mandil were two Zenata tribes that, following the collapse of the Almohad Caliphate, came to control the Chelif River valley. They were the principal rivals of the Zayyanids of Tlemcen.

== Campaign ==
In 1235, Abu Zakariya Yahya marched against the Banu Tujin in the Ouarsenis valley and captured their leader, Abd al-Qawi. He subsequently released him and secured the submission of the Banu Tujin. Abd al-Qawi would later go so far as to participate in the siege of Tlemcen in 1242.

As for the Banu Mandil, Abu Zakariya Yahya did not need to fight to secure their submission. The leader of the Banu Mandil turned to him for support in the face of the Zayyanid threat.

== Aftermath ==
The new leader of the Banu Mandil, Ali ibn Mandil, requested assistance from Abu Zakariya Yahya to launch a military expedition against Tlemcen in 1241. The expedition was carried out the following year, in 1242, and the Zayyanids pledged allegiance to the Hafsids.

== Sources ==
- Dahdouh, Abdelkader (2009). منطقة تيسمسيلت بين المحطات التاريخية والمواقع الأثرية (in Arabic).
- Frémeaux, Jacques (2010). Le Maghreb médian zayânide : logiques tribales et cité-État de Tlemcen (in French).
- Bakhta, Khelili; Mansouria, Kaddour (2025). Mazouna, the Habitat of Civilization and Its Incubator - a Center for Scientific and Cultural Radiation (PDF).
- Ibn Khaldoun, Yahya (1380). أعادوا لقومهم مغراوة من الملك بموطنهم الأول من شلف وما إليه من نواحي المغرب الأوسط (in Arabic).
- Brunchvig, Robert (1940). La Berbèrie ortientale sous les Hafsides (PDF) (in French).
