= Abu Zakariya campaign in eastern Algeria =

Abu Zakariya’s campaign in eastern Algeria
- Part of Campaigns of Abu Zakariya Yahya
Date	1229–1230
Location	Béjaïa,Constantine, Algeria
Result	Hafsid victory: beginning of the Hafsid sultanate

Belligerents
Almohad Caliphate; Tribe of Eastern Algeria Supported by: Banu Mirdas; Banu Daouaouïda	Hafsid dynasty

Commanders and leaders
Idris al-Ma'mun; Sayyid Ibn Sayyid Abi Abd Allah al-Kharsani ibn Yusuf al-Ashri (POW); Sayyid Abou Imran Ibn Sayyid Abi Abd Allah al-Kharsani (POW); Cheikh of Banu Mirdas (POW); Cheikh of Daouaouïda (POW)	Abu Zakariya Yahya

Strength
Unknown	Unknown

Casualties and losses
Unknown	Unknown

The Abu Zakariya Yahya's campaign in Eastern Algeria took place from 1229 to 1230. It marked the Hafsid dynasty’s break with the Almohad Caliphate and the beginning of the independent Hafsid sultanate

== Background ==
Taking advantage of the weakening of the Almohad Caliphate and Caliph Idris al-Ma’mun's rejection of Almohad doctrine, Abu Zakariya Yahya revolted against the authority of Marrakesh. He first removed the name of the Almohad Caliphate from the prayer sermon, an act regarded as an affront to the caliph. However, due to his inability to respond effectively, the caliph was unable to take significant action against him.

== Campaign ==
In 1229, Abu Zakariya Yahya marched on Béjaïa and entered the city with little resistance. On the one hand, the Almohad Caliphate was too weakened to mount an effective response; on the other hand, Abu Zakariya Yahya sought to avoid destroying the city. Béjaïa was one of the principal economic centers of North Africa, largely due to its port, and its destruction would have been detrimental to the future Hafsid Sultanate. The governor of the city, Sayyid Abu Imran ibn Sayyid Abi Abd Allah al-Kharsani, was captured and sent as a prisoner to Mahdia.

Earlier that same year, Abu Zakariya Yahya besieged Constantine for several days. With the assistance of the jurist Ibn al-Nas, he captured the city and its governor, Sayyid ibn Sayyid Abi Abd Allah al-Kharsani ibn Yusuf al-Ashri. Abu Zakariya Yahya appointed Ibn al-Nu’man as governor of Constantine and sent the captured governor to Mahdia.

== Aftermath ==
After capturing and imprisoning the leaders of Constantine and Béjaïa, as well as the leaders of the Banu Mirdas and the Dawawida, who had joined forces against the sultan, Abu Zakariya Yahya completed the conquest of Ifriqiya. His realm now extended from Sirte to Kabylia.

== Sources ==
- Fierro, Maribel (2011). The Western Islamic World Eleventh to Eighteenth Centuries (PDF). Cambridge university press.
- Storia, lingo. Dinastia Hafside Per Principianti Sovrani, politica, vita di corte, commercio mediterraneo, religione ed eredità della Tunisi medievale (in Italian).
- Ibn Khaldoun, Yahya (2000). Kitab al-Ibar wa Diwan al-Mutada wa al-Khabar vol.6 (in Arabic). Khalil Shihadeh, Dar al-Fikr, Lebanon.
- Brunchvig, Robert (1940). La Berbérie Ortientale sous les Hafsides des origines à la fin du XVe Siècle (PDF) (in French). Librairie d’Amérique et d’Orient.
