= Hawwara expedition =

- Part of Campaigns of Abu Zakariya Yahya
Date	1238
Location	Algeria–Tunisia border
Result	Hafsid victory

Belligerents
Hawwara	Hafsid dynasty

Commanders and leaders
Unknown	Abu Zakariya Yahya

Strength
Unknown	Unknown

Casualties and losses
All the survivors are enslaved	Unknown

The Hawwara expedition was a punitive campaign launched in 1238 by the Hafsid caliph Abu Zakariya Yahya against the Hawwara tribe. It ended with the enslavement of the Hawwara contingent.

== Background ==
The Hawwara were a large tribe whose branches were dispersed throughout the Maghreb. In this case, the reference is to the branch settled along the border between present-day Tunisia and Algeria, more specifically between Tébessa and Béja. This branch was affiliated with the Arab Banu Sulaym tribe, which was hostile to the Hafsid caliph Abu Zakariya Yahya.

== Expedition ==
In 1238, Abu Zakariya Yahya sent his army to punish the Hawwara for their rejection of the Hafsid dynasty and their attacks on travellers, whom they robbed. The Hawwara contingent was completely defeated during the battle, and the survivors were enslaved.

== Aftermath ==
After punishing the Hawwara, Abu Zakariya Yahya had effectively consolidated his authority in Ifriqiya and began pursuing more ambitious objectives. In 1242, he extended his influence to Tlemcen, bringing the Zayyanids into a vassal relationship with the Hafsid dynasty. These developments also marked the emergence of Hafsid ambitions to expand westward towards Morocco and Al-Andalus.

== Sources ==
- Gast, Marceau (2011). Houara (in French). Encyclopédie Berbère.
- Brunchvig, Robert (1940). La Berbèrie orientale sous les Hafsides (PDF) (in French).
- Rouighi, Ramzi (2011). The Making of a Mediterranean Emirate.
