= Siege of Tlemcen (1242) =

- Part of Campaigns of Abu Zakariya Yahya
Date	1242
Location	Tlemcen
Result	Hafsid decisive victory: The Kingdom of Tlemcen is officially a vassal of the Hafsid

Belligerents
Hafsid dynasty	Kingdom of Tlemcen

Commanders and leaders
Abu Zakariya Yahya	Yaghmurasen ibn Zyan (surrendered)

Strength
Unknown	Unknown

Casualties and losses
Unknown	Unknown

The siege of Tlemcen took place in 1242 and marked an important stage in the Campaigns of Abu Zakariya Yahya. It opposed the forces of the Kingdom of Tlemcen to those of the Hafsids, and ended with the defeat of Tlemcen, leading to its vassalization.

== Background ==
In 1226, Emir Abu Zakariya Yahya broke away from the Almohads and began an expansion toward the west, which brought him to Tlemcen in 1242.

== Course of events ==
The Hafsids took position in the surroundings of Tlemcen. Yaghmurasen Ibn Zyan marched out with his troops, but the Hafsids responded by harassing his forces, which were forced to retreat behind the city walls. Abu Zakariya Yahya and his troops then breached the city's defenses, prompting the flight of King Yaghmurasen Ibn Zyan and his family.

== Aftermath ==
The siege of Tlemcen resulted in the vassalization of the Kingdom of Tlemcen and opened the road to Morocco for the continuation of the Hafsid sultan's campaigns.
