= Al-Hawa Mosque =

Mosque in Tunis, Tunisia

al-Hawa Mosque
- جامع الهواء
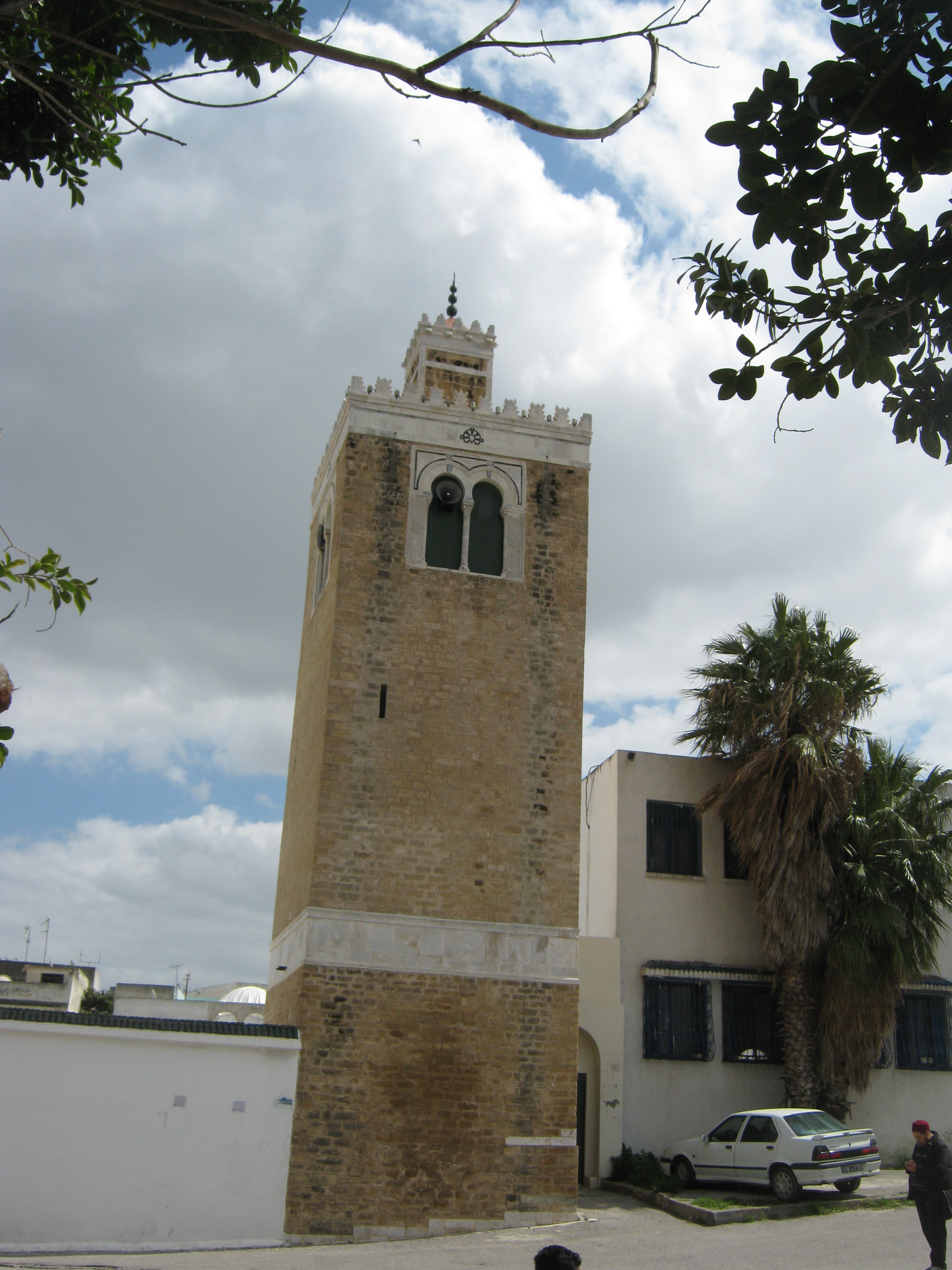
- Minaret of the mosque

- Location within Tunisia

Religion
- Affiliation: Islam
- Branch/tradition: Sunni

Location
- Location: Tunis, Tunisia
- Interactive map of al-Hawa Mosque
- Coordinates: 36°47′34″N 10°09′55″E

Architecture
- Type: Mosque
- Style: Hafsid

The al-Hawa Mosque (Arabic: جامع الهواء; also transliterated as al-Haoua Mosque in French), also known as the Tawfiq Mosque, is a historic mosque in Tunis, Tunisia. It was first built in the 13th century under the Hafsids and later renovated in the 18th century under the Husainids. It is an official Historical Monument.

== History ==
This mosque was built circa 1252 by Princess Atf, the widow of the first Hafsid sultan, Abu Zakariya Yahya (d. 1249), and mother to his successor, Muhammad I al-Mustansir. Around the same time, Atf also commissioned the construction of an accompanying madrasa, the Madrasa al-Hawa or Madrasa al-Tawfiqiya, which was the second madrasa built in Tunis (the first being the Shamma'iya Madrasa). The complex was built in what was then a suburb on the outskirts of the old city of Tunis.

The mosque was used as an educational institution by Andalusi immigrants to the city. As it later fell into ruin, it became an "outdoor mosque", on a hill overlooking the gardens and orchards in a place called "Rawdha Essououd". Under the rule of Bey Husayn (1705–1735), the mosque was renovated.

== Architecture ==
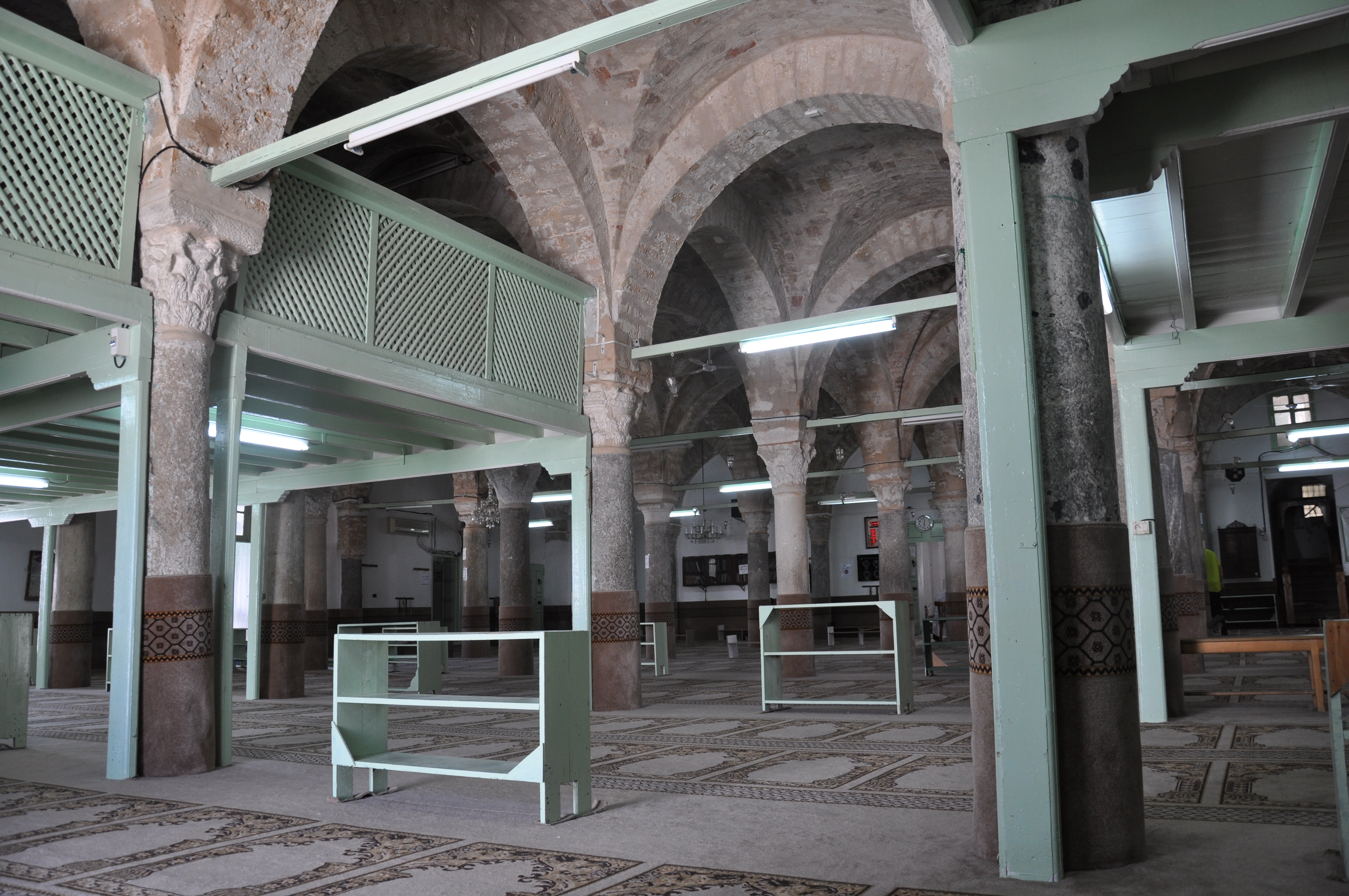
Interior of the mosque's prayer hall

The mosque consists of a hypostyle prayer hall without a traditional courtyard. The prayer hall is divided by rows of columns into 42 square bays, each bay covered by a brick-built groin vault of reinforced by arch bands. The columns and capitals are spolia from older Christian buildings, as these materials were still available in the country at the time.

The bay in front of the mihrab is covered by a dome with a cylindrical drum. On the inside, the transition between the square bay and the round dome is achieved by four squinches carved with scallop-like grooves. This is a feature with local precedents dating back to Aghlabid architecture in the 9th century.
