= Conquest of Algiers (1234) =

- Part of Campaigns of Abu Zakariya Yahya
Date	1234
Location	Algiers, Almohad Caliphate
Result	Hafsid victory

Belligerents
Almohad Caliphate	Hafsid dynasty

Commanders and leaders
Ibn al Hakam (surrendered)	Abu Zakariya Yahya

Strength
Unknown	Unknown

Casualties and losses
Unknown	Unknown

The Siege of Algiers took place in 1234 as part of the expansion campaigns of the Hafsid sultan Abu Zakariya Yahya. The siege pitted the Almohad forces of Algiers, led by the city's governor, Ibn al-Hakam, against the Hafsid forces commanded by Abu Zakariya Yahya. It ended with the Hafsid conquest of Algiers.

== Background ==
Following the fragmentation of the Almohad Caliphate into three separate dynasties, the city of Algiers attempted to establish an independent government under Ibn al-Hakam.

Taking advantage of the weakness of the last Almohad governors in the Maghreb, Abu Zakariya Yahya expanded his territories through a series of military campaigns. In 1229, he conquered Béjaïa and Constantine. In 1234, he advanced on Algiers with the aim of subjugating its governor, Ibn al-Hakam.

== Conquest ==
In 1234, Abu Zakariya Yahya marched on Algiers. On the advice of the city's leading figures, the Almohad governor hastened to pledge allegiance to the Hafsid sultan. Abu Zakariya Yahya thus entered the city without encountering any resistance.

== Aftermath ==
Following the conquest of Algiers, Abu Zakariya Yahya completed his conquest of the central Maghreb and appointed his son, Abu Yahya, to govern the region.

== Sources ==
- Moussaoui, Zaineb (2009). "مدينة الجزائر في العصور الوسطى". CRASC. centre de recherche en anthropologie sociale et culturelle.
- Malakh, Abdul Jalil (2015). الدولة الموحدية في المغرب الأوسط (in Arabic). Gharaïa University.
- Ibn Hajar al-asqalani, Ahmad (1972). الدرر الكامنة في أعيان المائة الثامنة (in Arabic).
- Piesse, Louis (1862). Itinéraire historique et descriptif de l'Algérie, comprenant le Tell et le Sahara (in French). Hachette.
