= Abd-Allah (Hafsid) =

Almohad governor of Ifriqiya from 1226 to 1228

Abu Muhammad Abdullah ibn Abd al-Wahid أبو عبدالله ابن أبي محمد ابن عبد الواحد

Almohad governor of Ifriqiya
- In office 1226–1228
- Preceded by: Abū Zayd al-Mušammar
- Succeeded by: Abu Zakariya Yahya

Personal details
- Parent: Abu Muhammad Abd al-Wahid ibn Abi Hafs (father)

Abu Muhammad Abdullah ibn Abd al-Wahid (Arabic: أبو عبدالله ابن أبي محمد ابن عبد الواحد), was the Almohad governor of Ifriqiya from 1226 to 1228.

== Life ==
Abdullah was the son of the Almohad governor of Ifriqya, Abu Muhammad Abd al-Wahid ibn Abi Hafs, whom the Almohads made the governor of Ifriqiya to better control the nomads of the Banu Hilal tribe.

In 1226, the Almohad caliph al-Adil replaced the governor Abu Zayd with Abu Muhammad Abdullah. In 1228, his brother Abu Zakaria Yahya I rebelled against him. Abdullah marched from Tunis to Qayrawan to confront his brother in battle, but his troops deserted him and Abu Zakariya overthrew him, forcing him to be content with the title of Sheikh and to devote himself to religious life.

== Literature ==
- Yver G. Ḥafṣids // Encyclopaedia of Islam, primera edición (1913-1936). Editada por M. Th. Houtsma, TW Arnold, R. Basset, R. Hartmann. Brill Online, 2016. Referencia. 20 de febrero de 2017
