= Kasbah Mosque, Tunis =

Mosque in Tunis, Tunisia

Kasbah Mosque
- جامع القصبة
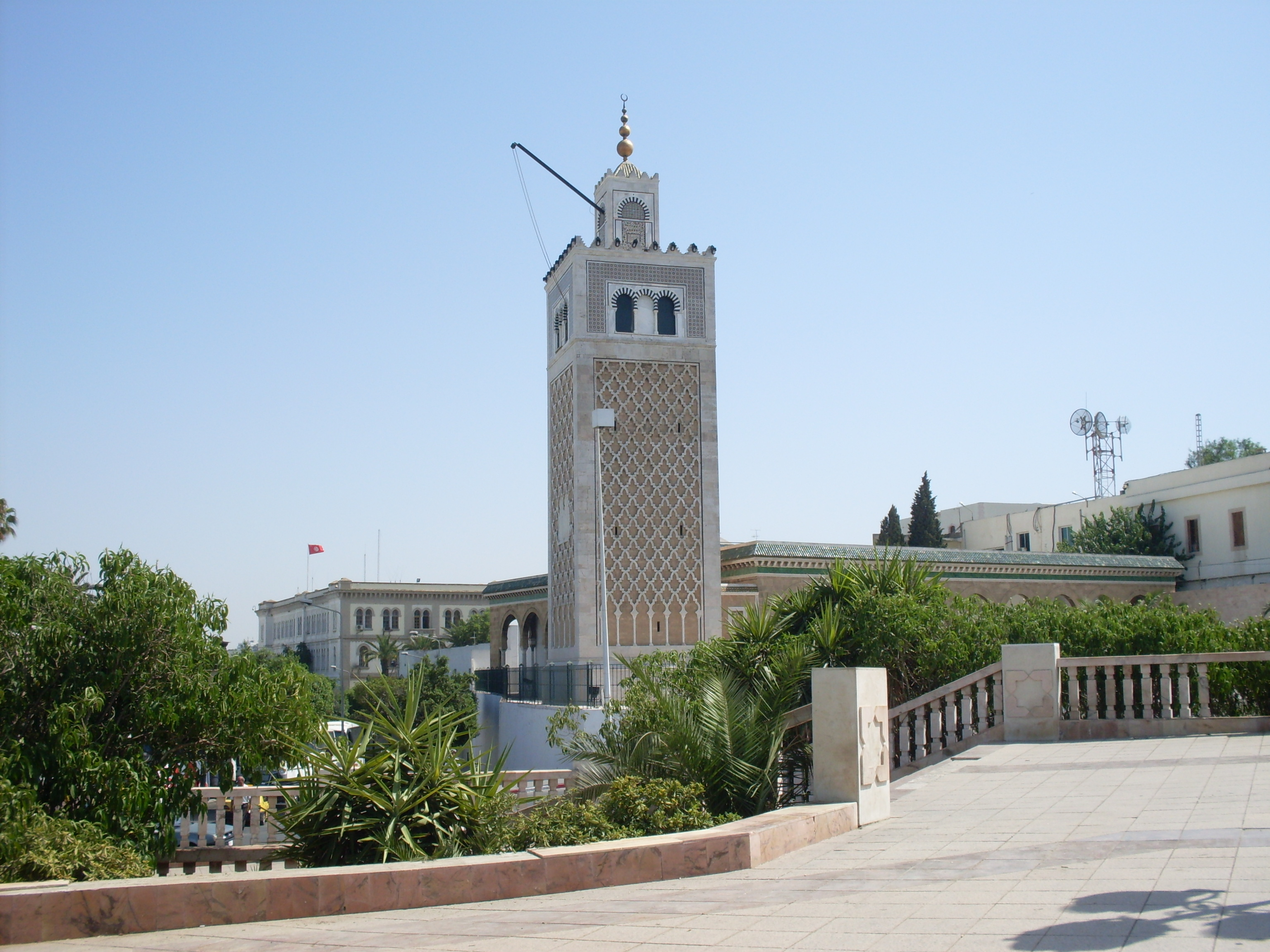

Religion
- Affiliation: Sunni Islam

Location
- Interactive map of Kasbah Mosque
- Coordinates: 36°47′48″N 10°10′04″E

Architecture
- Architect: Ali ibn Muhammad ibn Qasim
- Type: Mosque
- Style: Moorish (Hafsid)
- Established: 1230–1231
- Completed: 1233

Kasbah Mosque (Arabic: جامع القصبة ; French: Mosquée de la Casbah) is a mosque in the Tunis, Tunisia. It stands in the Kasbah district of the historic medina of Tunis. It was built between 1230 and 1233 on the orders of the first Hafsid ruler, Abu Zakariya Yahya, to serve as the main Friday mosque of the Kasbah.

== History ==
The mosque was commissioned by Abu Zakariya Yahya (r. 1230–1249), in 1230 or 1231, shortly after he declared his independence from the Almohads in 1229. He became the founder of the Hafsid dynasty which ruled Ifriqiya (roughly present-day Tunisia) until the 16th century. The architect was Ali ibn Muhammad ibn Qasim. The minaret was completed in 1233. It was the first Friday mosque to be built in Tunis after Al-Zaytuna Mosque. The mosque was built in the Kasbah, the citadel or seat of government in the city which was first established by the Almohads. Shortly before the mosque's foundation, Abu Zakariya had begun construction of a new palace for himself in the Kasbah.

Initially, the mosque was a place of prayer reserved for the rulers who lived in the Kasbah, but it later became a public mosque for the Friday prayer open to the whole city. The mosque was renovated under Ottoman rule in 1584, at which point its wooden minbar was replaced with a stone minbar.

== Architecture ==
The mosque has a rectangular prayer hall that is deeper than it is wide, which was unusual for Almohad-style mosques of the era. The prayer hall is divided into seven "naves" between rows of horseshoe arches, with nine arch spans for each nave. The arches are supported on marble columns with Hafsid-period capitals. The hall is roofed by a series of groin vaults. The mihrab (niche symbolizing the direction of prayer) in the southeast wall is decorated with marble paneling and flanked by decorative colonettes, although most of it is no longer preserved in its original condition. Above and in front of the mihrab is a dome sculpted in intricate muqarnas (stalactite-like decoration). This decorative technique was common in more western regions of North Africa but the muqarnas dome of this mosque is almost unique in Ifriqiya (Tunisia) and was unparalleled in other Hafsid architecture.

The design of the minaret is directly inherited from Almohad architecture further west. In particular, it resembles the design of the minaret of the Kasbah Mosque in Marrakesh, Morocco, in both its overall form and in the decoration of its facades. The four facades are covered in two different sebka or lozenge-like motifs. However, unlike the mosque in Marrakesh, which was made in brick, the main structure and the decoration of this minaret are made of stone, reflecting the ancient local traditions of stone cutting. The upper part of the minaret is decorated with triple horseshoe-arch-shaped windows surrounded by a zone covered with tiles. The minaret's style influenced the look of later minarets in Tunisia and was often copied. Examples of this influence are the minaret of the 17th-century Great Mosque of Testour and the modern minaret of the Al-Zaytuna Mosque.

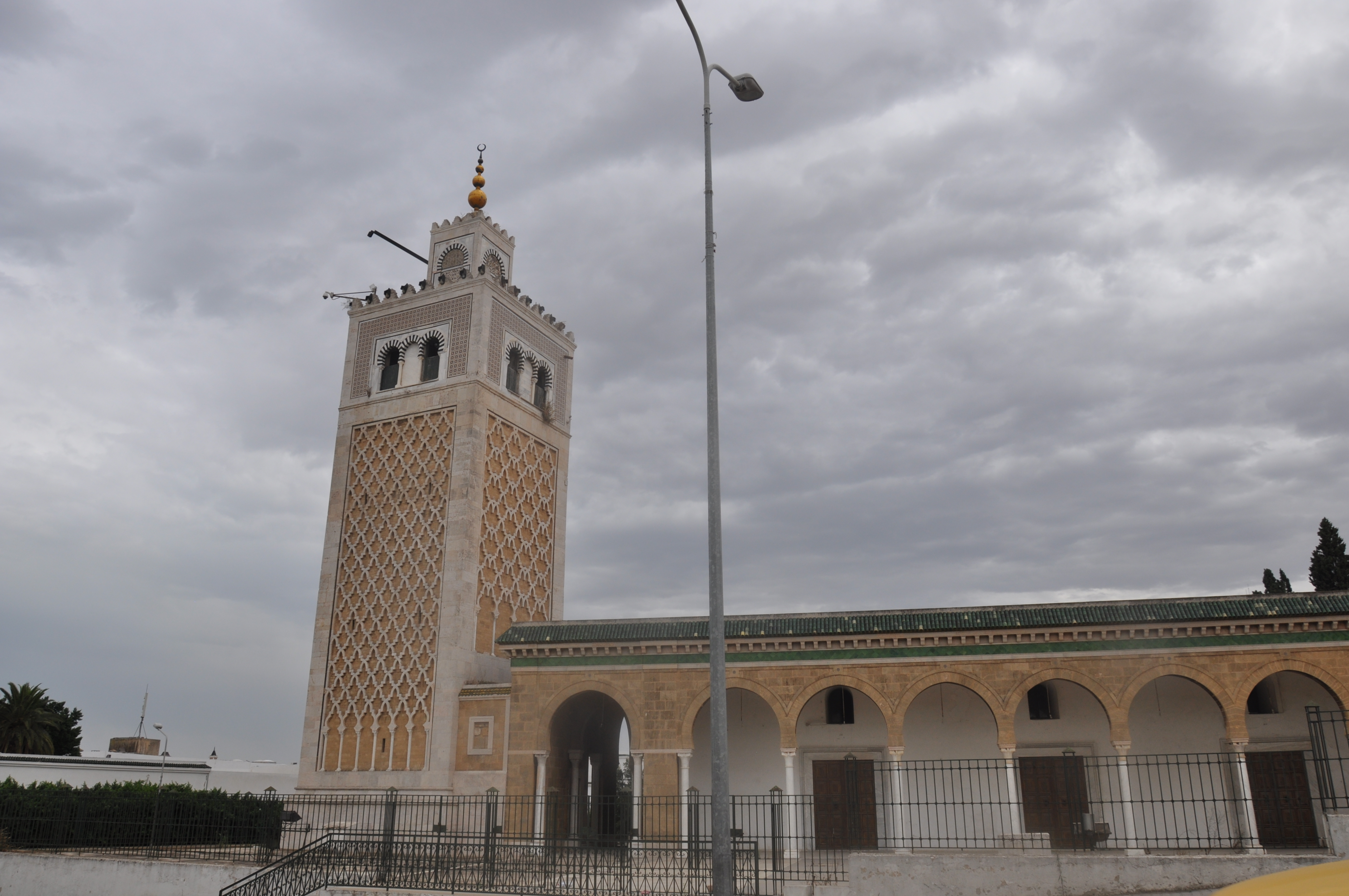
Front of the mosque, with an arcade or portico along its façade (right)

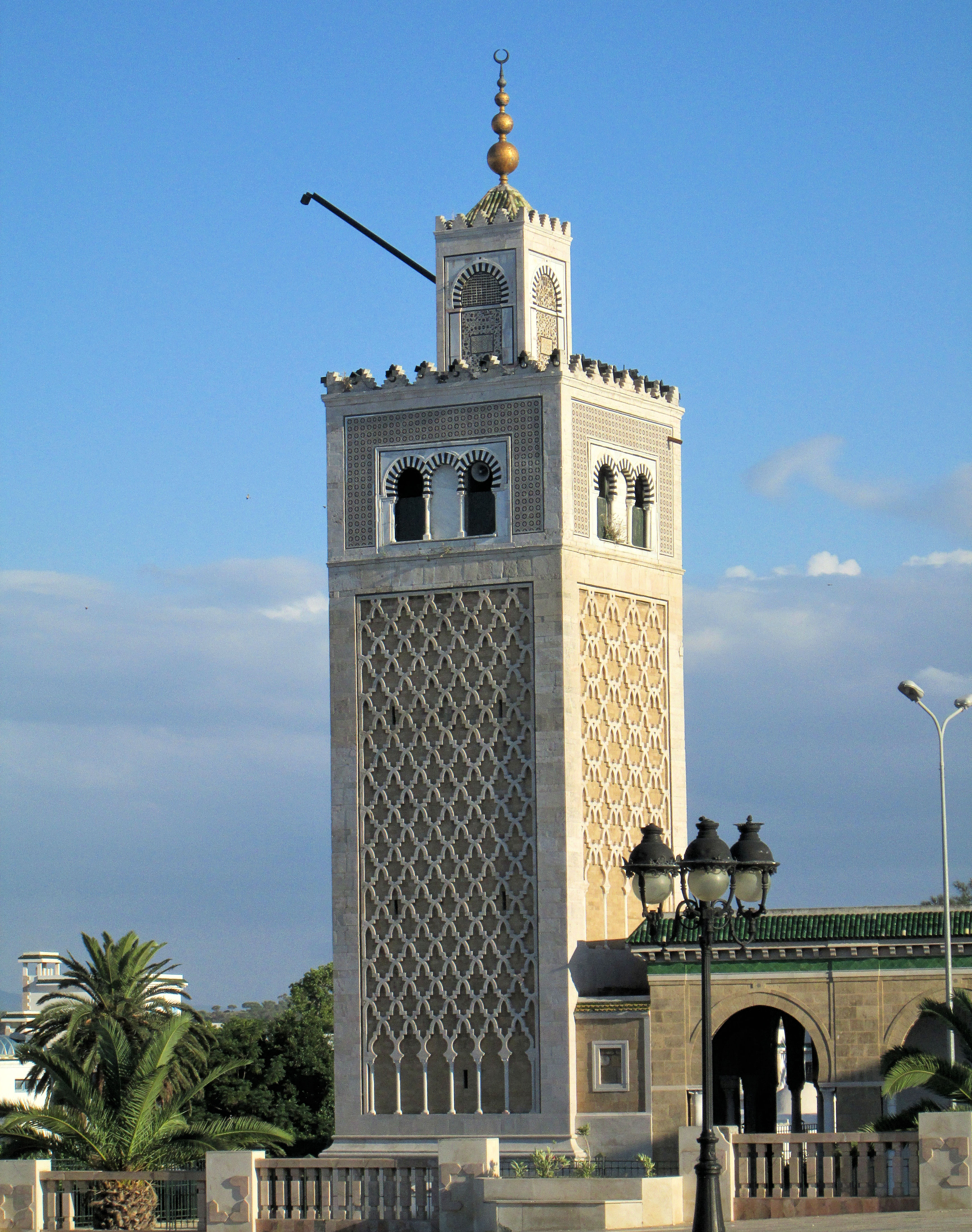
View of the minaret

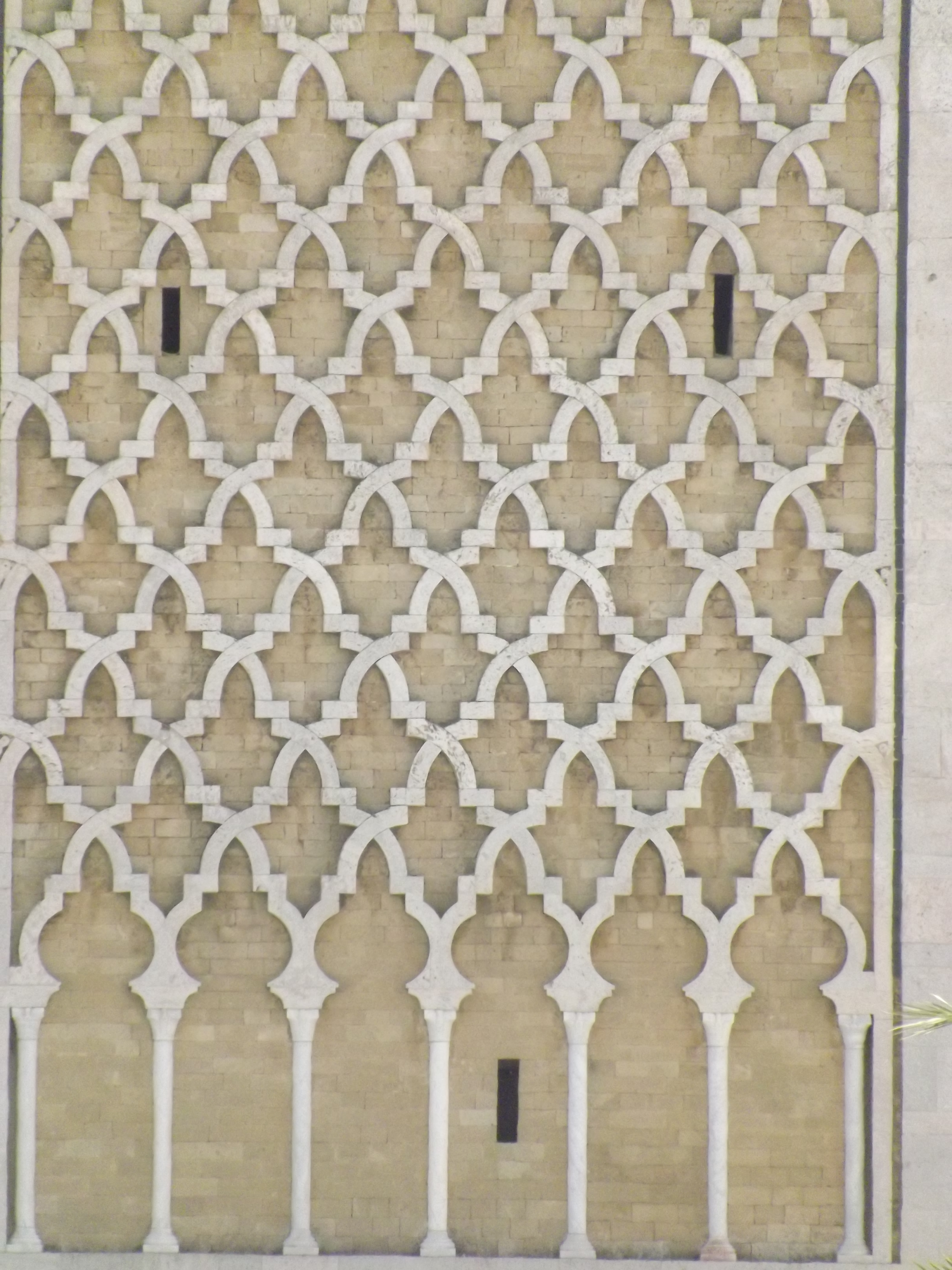
Sebka motif on one of the façades of the minaret

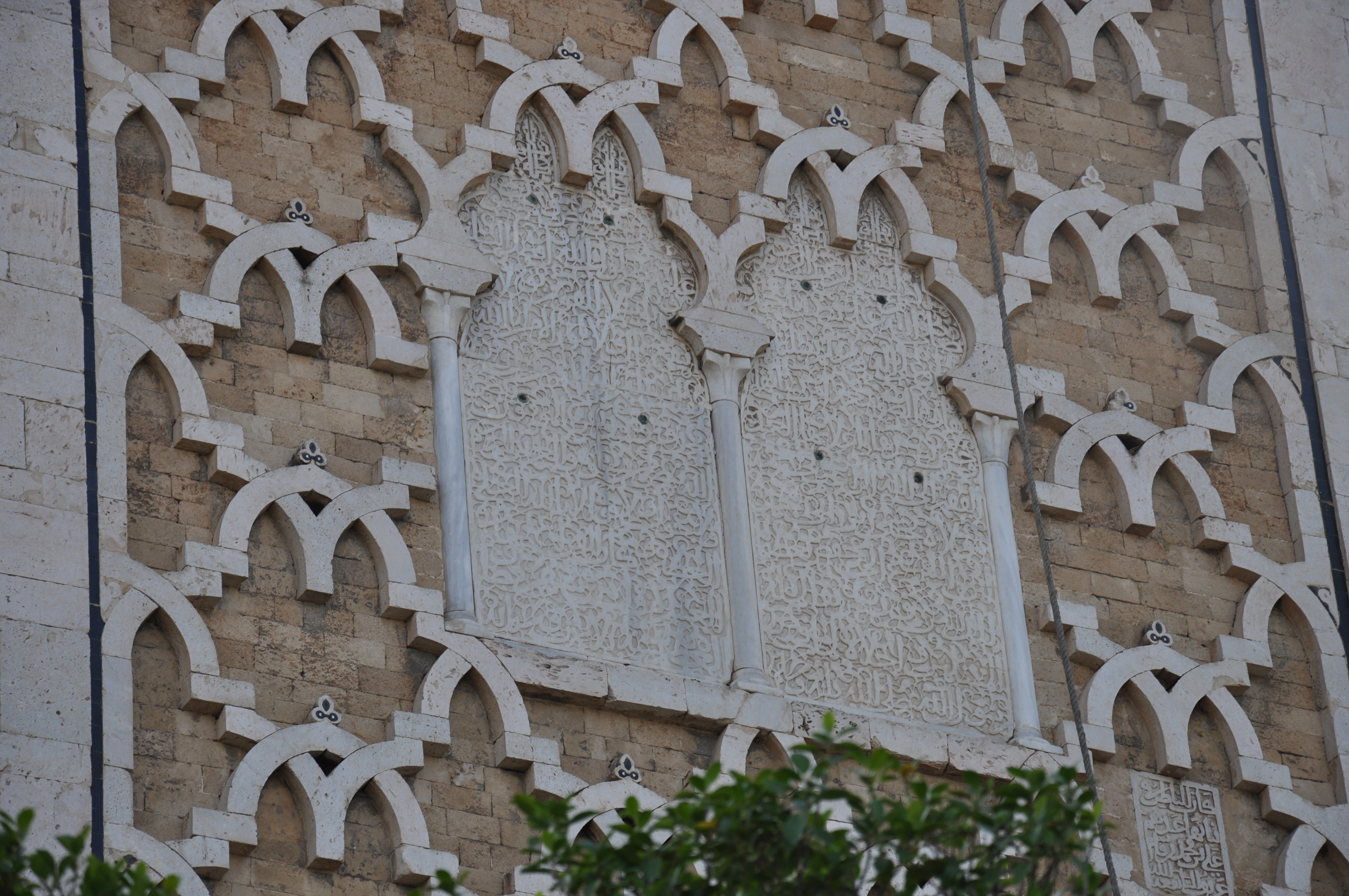
Panel carved with foundation inscription on the minaret

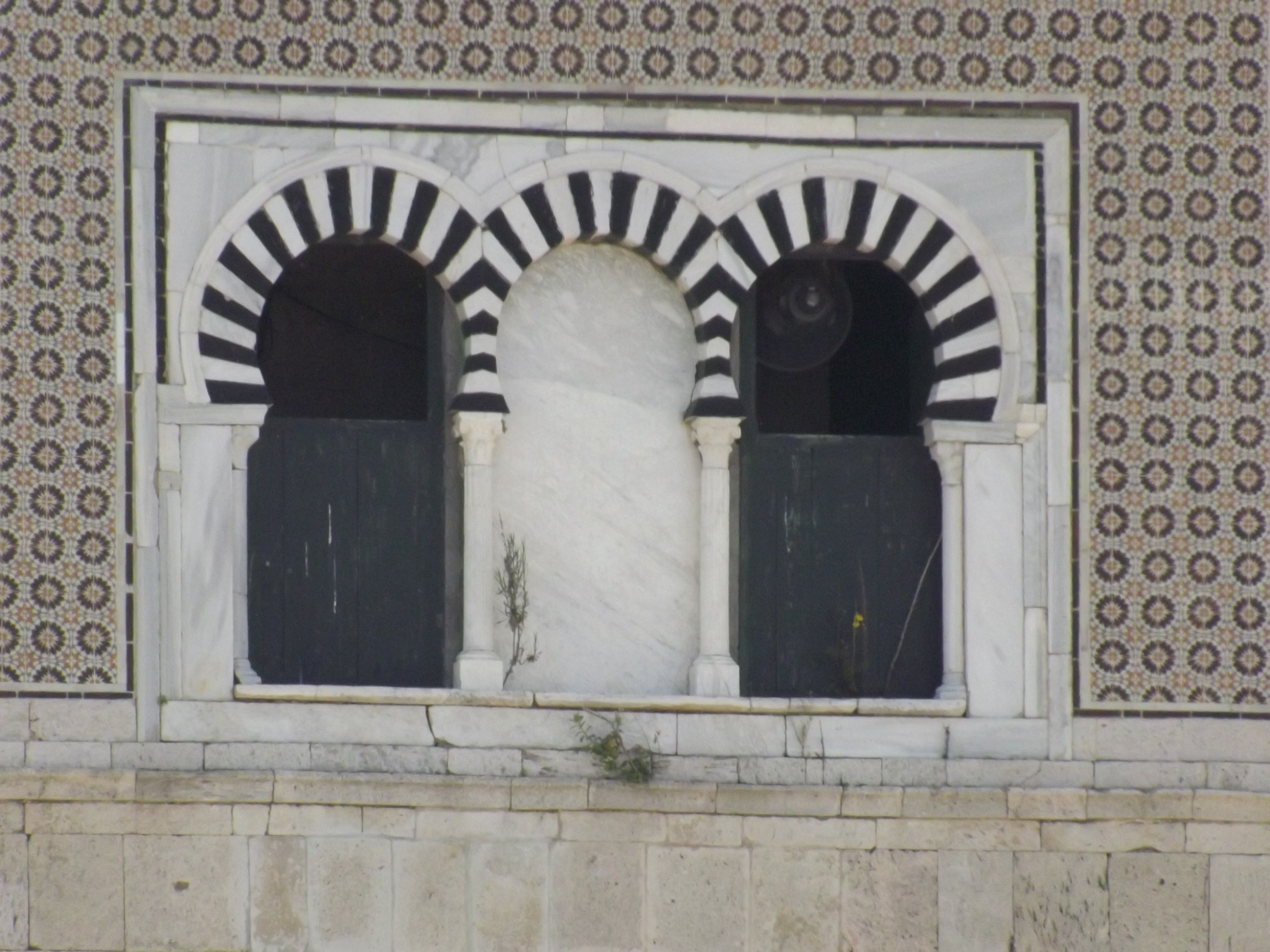
Decoration of the upper part of the minaret
