= Abdellia Palace =

Coordinates: 36.8800°N 10.3248°E

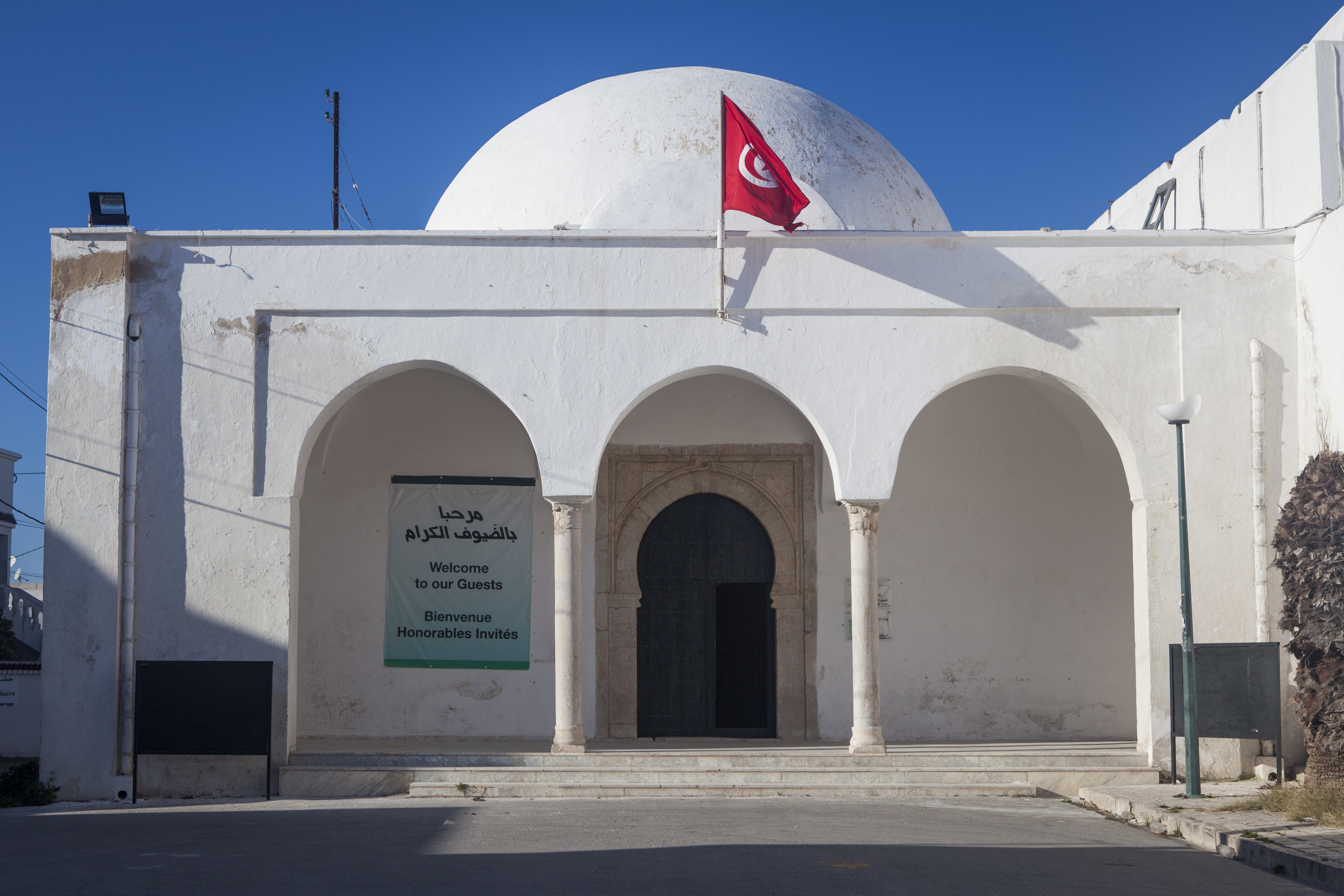
View of the Abdellia Palace

Abdellia Palace (Arabic: قصر العبدلية) is a palace located in La Marsa, a town in the northern suburbs of the capital of Tunisia, Tunis.

It is built in 1500 (905 AH) by Abu Abdallah Muhammad IV al-Mutawakkil when he was in power. In the 17th and 18th century it became a summer residence for the Muradids and Husainids and a fortified shelter from external threats.

Among personalities who inhabited the palace, Mahmud ibn Muhammad (1814–1824), his son Al-Husayn II ibn Mahmud and the British consuls Richard Wood and Thomas Reade can be cited.

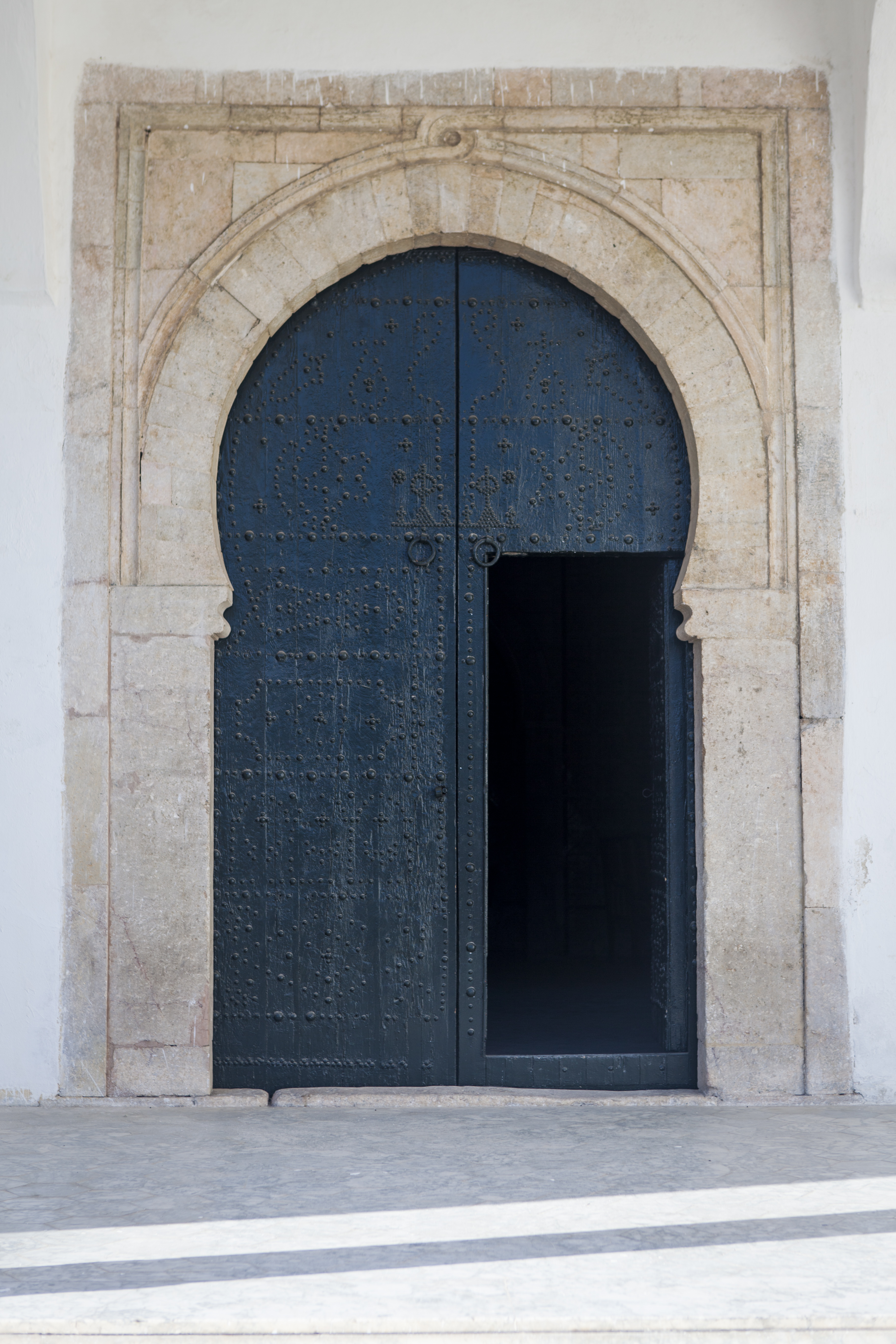
Palace gate

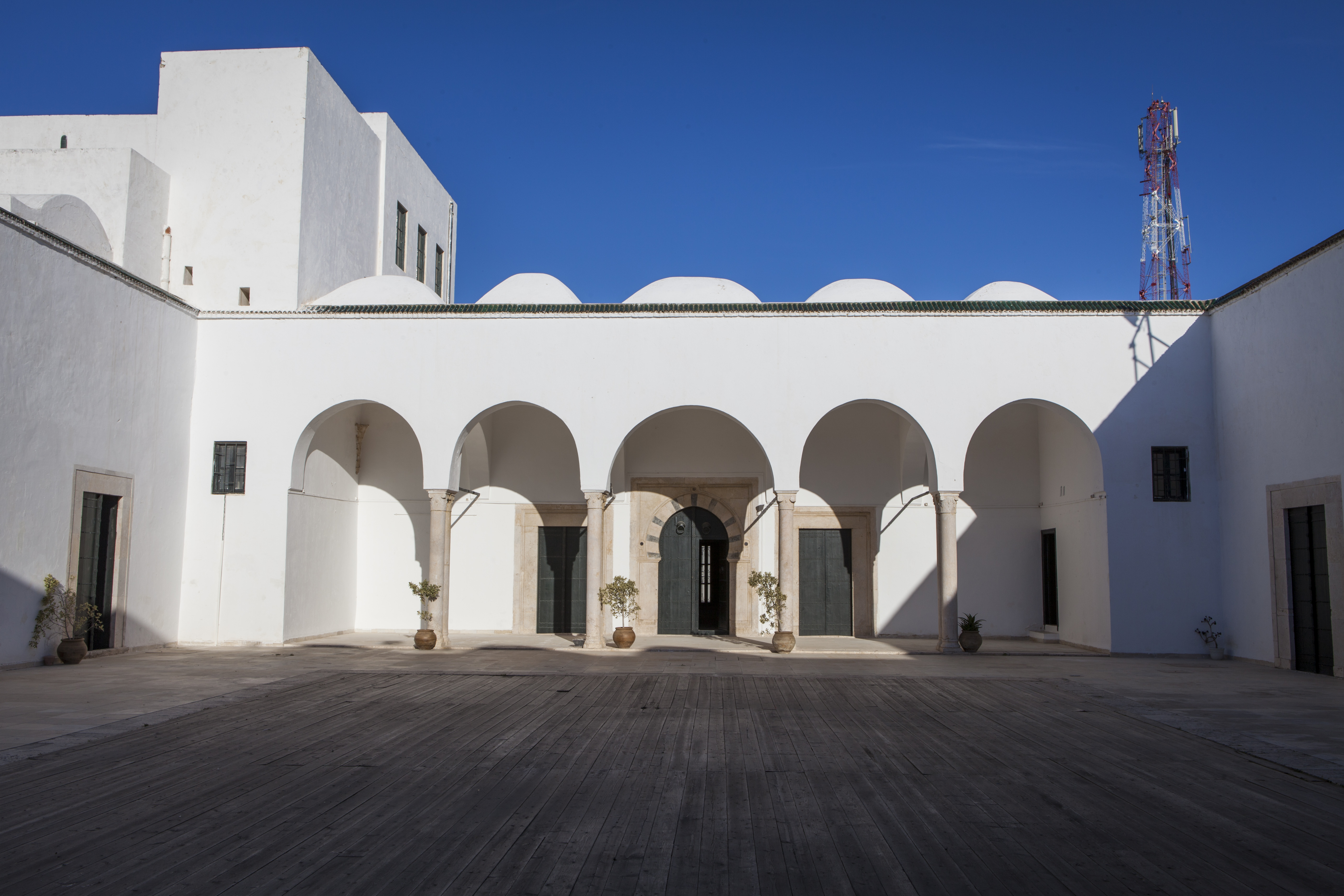
Palace patio

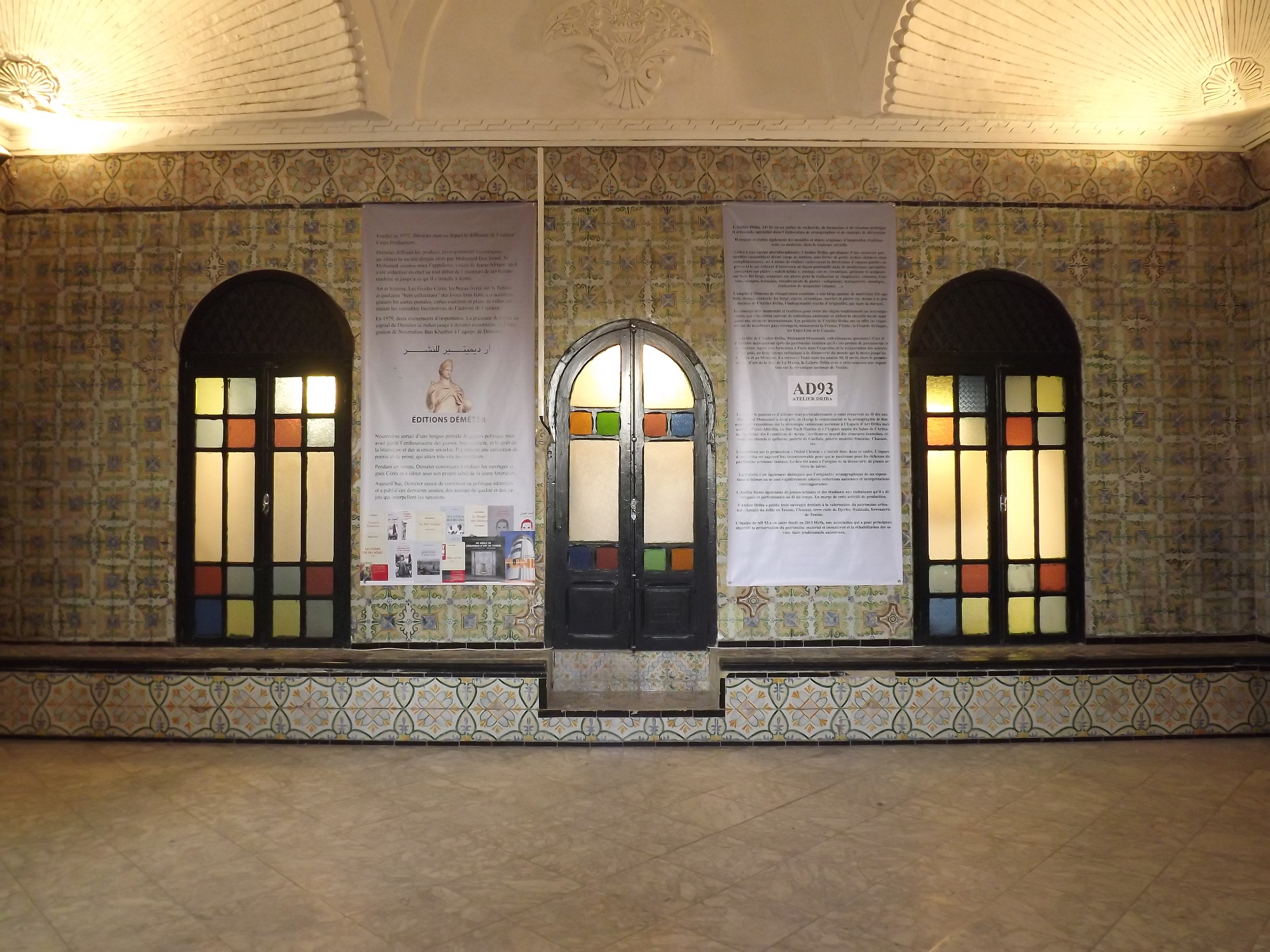
Interior view
