= Abu Muhammad Abd al-Wahid ibn Abi Hafs =

Almohad governor of Ifriqya from 1207 to 1221

Abu Muhamad Abd Al-Wahid ibn Abi Hafs أبو محمد عبد الواحد بن أبي حفص

Almohad governor of Ifriqiya
- In office 1207–1221
- Succeeded by: Abū l-ʿAlāʾ Idrīs ibn Yūsuf

Personal details
- Died: 25 February 1221 Tunis
- Parent: Abu Hafs Umar ibn Yahya al-Hintati (father)

Abu Muhammad Abd al-Wahid ibn Abi Hafs al-Hintati (Arabic: أبو محمد عبد الواحد بن أبي حفص, d. 25 February 1221), or simply Abd al-Wahid, was the Almohad governor of Ifriqiya from 1207 to 1221 and the father of the first Hafsid sultan Abu Zakariya Yahya.

== Life ==
Abd al-Wahid belonged to the Hintata, a Berber tribe of the High Atlas mountains of Morocco. His father Abu Hafs Umar ibn Yahya al-Hintati was a tribal chief of the Hintata and a close companion of Ibn Tumart who contributed to the triumph of the Almohads, occupying important positions in their government.

In October 1205, Abd al-Wahid led a cavalry of 4,000 soldiers and crushed in a battle at Jabal Tājrā southeast of Qābis Yahya ibn Ghaniya, the Banu Ghaniya warlord who attempted to conquer the Maghreb from the Almohads. In January 1206, in the company of the Almohad Caliph Muhammad al-Nasir, he obtained the surrender of al-Mahdia, whose governor, 'Ali ibn Ghazi, cousin of Yahya, rallied to the Almohad cause. Before leaving for Morocco, the caliph entrusted the administration of the province of Abd al-Wahid, one of his trusted lieutenants. This strengthened the authority of Abd al-Wahid to such an extent that his successors ceased to consider themselves governors and freed themselves from the rule of the Almohads in 1229. The new kingdom soon extended its power to Béjaïa and a number of neighboring regions.

Abd al-Wahid was succeeded Abū l-ʿAlāʾ Idrīs ibn Yūsuf, a grandson of the Almohad caliph Abd al-Mumin.

Abd al-Wahid died in Tunis on 25 February 1221.

== Bibliography ==
- Baadj, Amar S. (2015). Saladin, the Almohads and the Banu Ghaniya. Leiden: Brill. ISBN 978-90-04-29620-6.
- Brunschwig, Robert (1940). La Berberie Orientale sous les Hafsides. Adrienne-Maisonneuve.
- Idris, H. R. (1986) [1971]. "Ḥafṣids". In Lewis, B.; Ménage, V. L.; Pellat, C.; Schacht, J. (eds.). Encyclopaedia of Islam. Vol. III (2nd ed.). Leiden, Netherlands: E. J. BRILL. ISBN 9004081186.
- Garnier, Sébastien (2018). "Perched on the Shoulders of Giants? Looking at the Almohad Empire in the Hafsid Chronicles". Arabica. 65 (5–6): 563–593. doi:10.1163/15700585-12341500.
