= Awlad Mandil =

Awlad Mandil or Banu Mandil were a ruling family of the Maghrawa, a Berber dynasty, that controlled several territories in North Africa approximately from c. 1160 to 1372. The Maghrawa were a prominent Berber tribe influential in the medieval history of the western Maghreb, with the Awlad Mandil family playing a key role in regional governance and politics during the later Almohad and Marinid periods.

== History ==
Khazrun ben Falful is said to be the first ancestor of the Banu Khazrun, the ruling dynasty of Tripoli from 1001 to 1146. Several branches are said to originate from the Banu Khazrum, the main ones being the rulers of Tripoli and Chelif. This last one originated from Abu Nas, whose son was Ibn Abu Nas, from whom Mandil I descended, the Almohad governor of Chelif c. 1160. His son, Abd al-Rhaman ben Mandil also became governor of Chelif c. 1180.

Mandil II ben Abd al-Rahman was governor of Chelif, Uarsenis, Madiyya (Médéa) and Mitidja c. 1190-1126 and died in 1126 at the hands of Yahya Ibn Ghaniya, who occupied Mitidja. Mandil II had several sons, the first of which was Al Abbas ben Mandil, governor of Chelif 1226-1249, who lost his fathers gains in wars against the Banu Tudjin. He was forced back into the heartlands of lower Chelif. However, the intervention of the Hafsids in the area changed Al Abbas' fortunes. In exchange for becoming a buffer vassal state for the Hafsids, al-ʿAbbas received Mliana, Ténès, Brechk and Cherchell.

Other sons of Mandil II included, Muhammad I ben Mandil, heir of his brother 1249-1263 (killed by Aid); Aid ben Mandil, governor of Uersenis and Madiyya 1263-1269; Umar ben Mandil, emir of Maghrawa 1269-1278. He was installed with the assistance of the Yaghmurasen, to whome he gave Milliana

Muhammad ben Thabit became the emir from 1294 to 1295 in the absence of his father. The Abdalwadid dynasty occupied their lands in 1295. Rashid ben Thabit ben Mandil asked for help from the Marinid dynasty of Morocco (1295), but the emirate was assigned to Umar ben Waghram ben Mandil (c. 1299-13002). Rashid revolted in Mazuna and defeated Umar ben Waghram, ruling the Maghrawa 1302-1310, allied to Hafsid dynasty of Bugia (Bidjaya) after 1307. In 1310 Rashid died, and his son Ali ben Rashid was deposed by the Hafsid dynasty, migrating to Morocco with his followers. In 1342, after a defeat of Hafsid against Marinids, he took Mliana, Tenes, Brechk and Cherchel, reestablishing the emirate of Maghrawa, however he committed suicide after being defeated by the Addalwadid (1351/1352). His son Hamza ben Ali moved to Morocco. He come back to Chelif and revolted with the help of the Maghrawa (1371) against Marinids, but was defeated in 1371, and fled to the lands of the tribe of Banu Husayn (that revolted against Marinids with the help of Abdalwadids) and took the title of emir of Titteri. Upon his defeat in Timzught, he was captured and executed (1372).
