= Campaigns of Abu Zakariya Yahya =

1229–1249 military campaigns

Abu Zakariya Yahya's campaign
Date	1229–1249
Location	Maghreb
Result	Hafsid decisive victory: the Maghreb is conquered by the Hafsid

Belligerents
Hafsid dynasty	Almohads; Kingdom of Tlemcen; Marinid dynasty Banu Ghaniya

Commanders and leaders
Abu Zakariya Yahya	Yahya ben Ghaniya; Yaghmurasen ibn Zyan

Strength
Unknown	Unknown

Casualties and losses
Unknown	Unknown

The campaigns of Abu Zakariya Yahya refer to several military expeditions carried out throughout the reign of the first Hafsid emir, Abu Zakariya Yahya, mainly taking place in the Maghreb region.

== Campaigns ==
Even before the Hafsids declared independence, Abu Zakariya Yahya had already broken away from the Almohad Caliphate. In 1230, he revolted and launched two military expeditions, during which he conquered Béjaïa and Constantine, thereby expanding his territory eastward.

In 1236, the Hafsids continued their expansion by subjugating the Banu Tudjin and Banu Mandil tribes. This allowed them to seize control of Algiers and advance as far as the Chelif River.

Later, in 1235, the Hafsid emir captured Tripoli, Libya, bringing the surrounding Arab populations under his control. This enabled him to consolidate his authority over the entire region of Ifriqiya.

One year after the official independence of the Hafsid dynasty in 1236, Abu Zakariya Yahya repelled the well-known Banu Ghaniya tribe near Miliana, killing their leader Yahya ibn Ghaniya in 1237.

In 1242, Abu Zakariya Yahya annexed Tlemcen, where he defeated Yaghmurasen Ibn Zyan, ruler of the Kingdom of Tlemcen, forcing him and his family to flee. After the battle, he compelled Yaghmurasen to recognize Hafsid suzerainty over Tlemcen, effectively annexing the entire Kingdom of Tlemcen.

He concluded his campaigns in Morocco, where cities such as Ceuta and Sijilmasa first submitted to his rule, followed later by Meknes and Tangier.
