= Abu Zakariya Yahya =

Sultan of the Hafsid Sultanate from 1229 to 1249

Abu Zakariya Yahya ibn Abu Muhamad Abd Al-Wahid أبو زكريا يحيى بن أبو محمد عبد الواحد
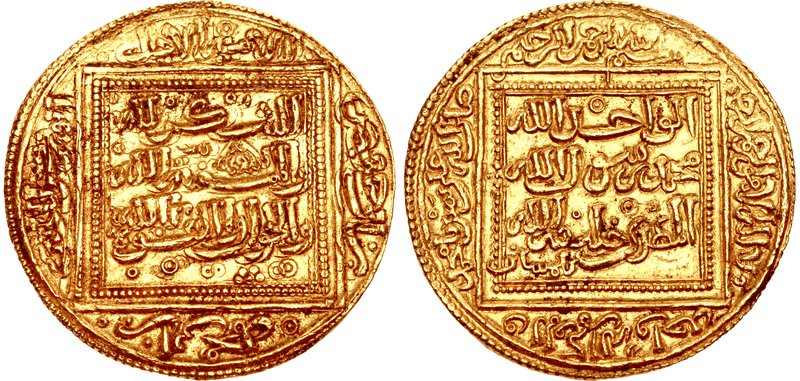
- Gold dinar of Abu Zakariya Yahya From Tlemcen.

1st Sultan of the Hafsid Sultanate
- Reign: 1229–1249
- Successor: Muhammad I al-Mustansir

Almohad governor of Ifriqiya
- Reign: 1228–1229
- Predecessor: Abd-Allah
- Born: 1203; Marrakesh, Almohad dynasty
- Died: 5 October 1249 (aged 45–46); Tunis, Hafsid dynasty
- Dynasty: Hafsids
- Father: Abu Muhammad Abd al-Wahid ibn Abi Hafs
- Religion: Islam

Abu Zakariya Yahya (Arabic: أبو زكريا يحيى بن أبو محمد عبد الواحد, full name Abu Zakariya Yahya I ibn Abu Muhamad Abd Al-Wahid; 1203 – 5 October 1249) was the founder and first sultan of the Hafsid dynasty in Ifriqiya. He was the grandson of Abu Hafs Umar ibn Yahya al-Hintati, the leader of the Hintata and second in command of the Almohads after Abd al-Mu'min.

== Life ==
Abu Zakariya Yahya was born in 1203 in Marrakesh. His father Abu Muhammad Abd al-Wahid ibn Abi Hafs was the Almohad governor of Ifriqya from 1207 to 1221. His grandfather Abu Hafs Umar ibn Yahya al-Hintati was a chief of the Hintata and a close companion of Ibn Tumart. By 1228 Abu Zakariya was the Almohad governor of Gabès and then of Tunis. Later in 1228 he rebelled against his brother Abu Muhammad Abdullah, who had been governor of Ifriqiya from 1226. In response, Abd-Allah marched from Tunis to Qayrawan to confront his brother in battle, but his troops deserted him and Abu Zakariya overthrew him, forcing him to be content with the title of Sheikh and to devote himself to religious life. Abu Zakariya then succeeded as head of the Hafsids.

In 1229 Abu Zakariya rebelled once more against central authority after he heard that the Almohad caliph in Marrakesh al-Ma'mun, had overthrown and killed two of his brothers and that he had cancelled the creed of Ibn Tumart. Additionally, al-Ma'mun instructed the Imams to insult Ibn Tumart in the mosques and cancelled the call to prayer in Berber.

=== Conquests ===
Abu Zakariya moved to expand his influence in the vicinity of his young state, and marched his army to Constantine and Béjaïa in 1229.

The Almohads were preoccupied with internal differences and sedition, and the revolutions that were taking place in Andalusia and in the Maghreb. So Abu Zakariya faced little resistance in annexing the territory of the Almohads.

=== Independence from the Almohads ===
Abu Zakariya returned to Tunis after his successful campaigns and declared independence in 1229. He subsequently annexed Tripoli in 1234, Algiers in 1235, Chelif River 1236, and subdued important tribal confederations of the Berbers from 1235 to 1238.

In July 1242 he captured Tlemcen, forcing the Sultan of Tlemcen to become his vassal and formed a series of small states between areas under his control and the states of the Western Maghreb.

In December 1242, the Almohad caliph Abd al-Wahid II died, leaving Abu Zakariya as the most powerful ruler of the Maghreb. At this time the Hafsids also occupied the Berber emirate of Siyilmasa which they were to retain for 30 years. By the end of Abu Zakariya's reign, the Marinid Dynasty of Morocco and several Muslim princes in Al-Andalus paid him tribute and acknowledged his nominal authority.

=== Trade and architecture ===
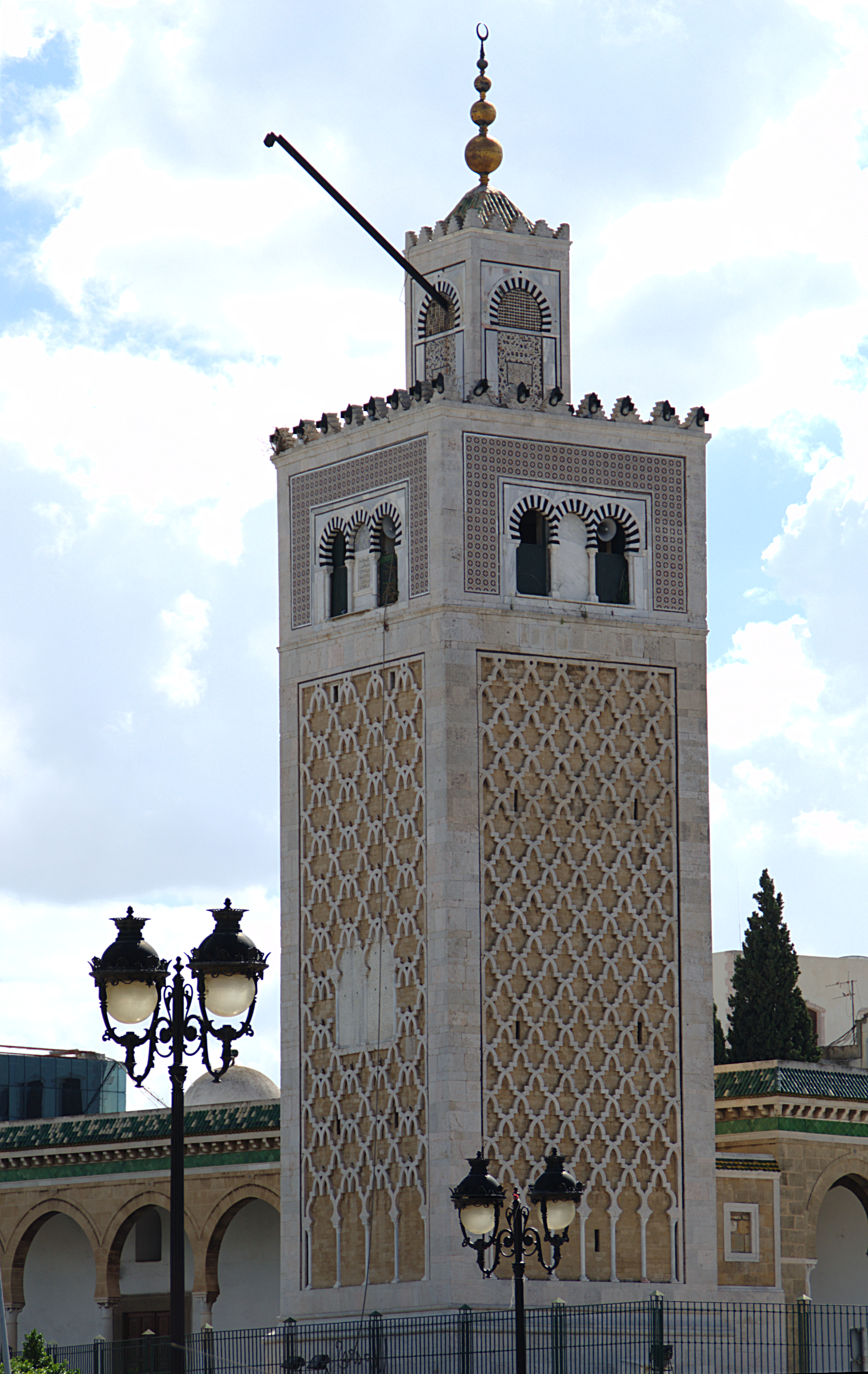
Minaret of the Kasbah Mosque, Tunisia, built by order of Abu Zakariya

Abu Zakariyya established his capital in Tunis where mosques, madrasas, souks and other buildings were built. Amongst this work was the Madrasa al-Shammā'iyya and the mosque of the Kasbah.

He began diplomatic and commercial relations with Emperor Frederick II of Swabia, the Crown of Aragon, Provence, Languedoc, with Venice, Pisa and Genoa. From 1239 he approached the Kingdom of Sicily, to which he paid an annual tribute in exchange for freedom of trade and the supply of Sicilian wheat. As Tunis's maritime trade increased, it became an important economic and cultural centre. During his reign Tunis offered refuge to those fleeing the Reconquista. Abu Zakariya welcomed to his court many notables and scholars from Andalusia.

Abu Zakariyya allowed Jews who had forcibly converted to Islam in the Almohad era to return to Judaism, returning to live in relatively normal conditions. Synagogues closed or destroyed in the Almohad era were reopened or rebuilt. The Jews played a very important role in the economic policy and foreign trade developed by Abu Zakariyya.

A skilful general, his ability to utilise the military power of the tribesmen enabled him to establish a strong state. His Hafsid dynasty brought peace, prosperity and stability to Tunisia.

Abu Zakariya died in 1249. His successor was Muhammad al-Mustansir, who proclaimed himself Caliph in 1256 and continued the policies of his father.

== Sources ==
- Julien, Charles-André. Histoire de l'Afrique du Nord, des origines à 1830, Payot, Paris, 1994.

Preceded by -	Hafsid dynasty 1229–1249	Succeeded by Muhammad I al-Mustansir
