= Siege of Nefta =

1441 battle in Nefta, Tunisia

- Part of Hafsid-Arab war
Date	1441
Location	Nefta, Tunisia
Result	Hafsid Victory: Nefta is incorporated into the territory Hafsid

Belligerents
Hafsid Dynasty	Banu Khalad

Commanders and leaders
Abu 'Amr 'Uthman	4 Governor of the Banu Khalaf †

Strength
Unknown	Unknown

Casualties and losses
Unknown	Heavy

The Battle of Nefta took place in 1441 and pitted the forces of the Hafsid dynasty under Caliph Abu 'Amr 'Uthman against the rebel tribe of the Banu Khalaf, who ruled Nefta. The conflict ended with the conquest of the city and the execution of its four governors.

== Background ==
After the death of Abu Faris Abd al-Aziz II, his grandson, Abu 'Amr 'Uthman, was known for having built many Madrasas in the country. However, for 17 years, he had to suppress several revolts by Arab tribes that rebelled against his authority.

== Battle ==
As the caliph's chamberlain, Abu al-Qasim Ibn Outtou, approached, the four rebel governors withdrew into their castles. However, after being abandoned by their subjects, they surrendered to the Sultan and were all executed.

== Aftermath ==
After the conquest, the sultan appointed Qaids to govern the city. His campaigns in the south of the country came to an end in 1451, and he succeeded in reunifying the region while preventing Arab dynasties from coming to power.
