= Abu Abd-Allah Muhammad al-Muntasir =

Hafsid Sultanate Caliph from 1434 to 1435

Caliph of the Hafsid Sultanate
- Reign: July 1434 – 16 September 1435
- Predecessor: Abu Faris Abd al-Aziz II
- Successor: Abu 'Amr 'Uthman
- Died: 16 September 1435; Hafsid Sultanate
- Dynasty: Hafsids
- Religion: Islam

Abu Abd-Allah Muhammad al-Muntasir (Arabic: أبو عبد الله محمد المنتصر الثاني) was the Hafsid caliph of Ifriqiya from 1434–1435.

== Life ==
Abu Abd-Allah Muhammad al-Muntasir was the son of Abu Abdallah Muhammad al-Mansour and a Christian concubine from Valencia known as Rīm. His father was the son and heir apparent of Abu Faris Abd al-Aziz II but he died before his father in 1430. Thereupon Abu Faris took the unusual step of declaring his grandson heir, when convention dictated that he choose another of his sons.

Fighting quickly broke out between his uncles over the succession. Abu Abd-Allah captured his uncle al-Mu’tamid and had him blinded. He also had his own brother Abu-l Fadl arrested. While he was on a military expedition in the South two more Hafsid princes rebelled, Abu-Yahya Zakariya and his brother. They fled to Constantine but were lured back to Tunis with an offer of clemency before they too were apparently executed. Abu Abd-Allah himself died of illness while on campaign against rebel Bedouin in September 1435. During his brief reign he was responsible for the building of a public water fountain at Bab Saadoun and a madrasa named after him, also in Tunis.

After his death disorder continued until all rebels were eventually subdued by his brother and successor Abu 'Amr 'Uthman.

| Preceded by Abu Faris Abd al-Aziz II | Hafsid dynasty 1434-1435 | Succeeded by Abu 'Amr 'Uthman |
