= Abu-l-Hasan Ali =

Abu-l-Hasan Ali may refer to:

- Abu-l-Hasan Ali (Hafsid prince) (died 1352), rebel Hafsid prince during the reign of Abu 'Amr 'Uthman
- Abu'l-Hasan Ali of Granada (died 1485), twenty-first ruler of the Emirate of Granada
- Abul Hasan Ali Hasani Nadwi (1913–1999), Indian Islamic scholar
