= Caliphate of Abu Bakr =

Abu Bakr's rule as caliph

Abu Bakr أَبُو بَكْر
- Khalifat Rasul Allah; Raḍiya Ilāhu ʿAnhū
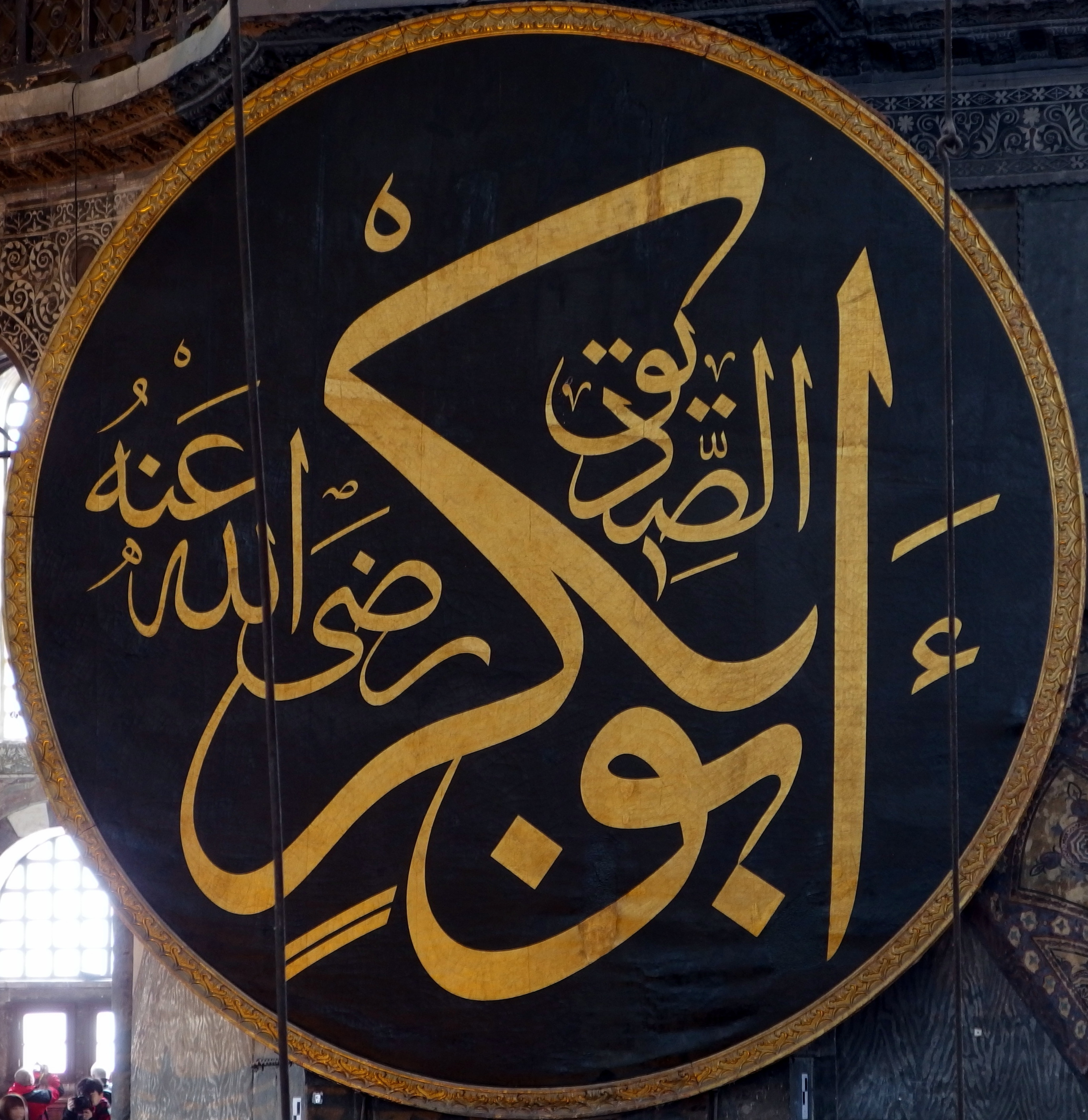
- Calligraphic seal featuring Abu Bakr's name, on display in the Hagia Sophia, Istanbul

1st Caliph of the Rashidun Caliphate
- Reign: 8 June 632 – 23 August 634
- Predecessor: Position established Muhammad (as Messenger of God)
- Successor: Umar
- Born: Abd Allah ibn Abi Quhafa c. 573; Mecca, Hejaz, Arabia
- Died: 23 August 634 (aged 60) (22 Jumada al-Thani 13 AH); Medina, Hejaz, Rashidun Caliphate
- Burial: Al-Masjid an-Nabawi, Medina
- Spouse: Qutayla bint Abd al-Uzza; Umm Ruman; Asma bint Umais; Habibah bint Kharijah
- Issue: Asma; Abd al-Rahman; Abd Allah; Aisha; Muhammad; Umm Kulthum
Names
- Abd Allah ibn Abi Quhafa عَبْد ٱللَّٰه بْن أَبِي قُحَافَة
- Father: Abu Quhafa
- Mother: Umm al-Khayr
- Brothers: Mu'taq; Utaiq; Quhafah
- Sisters: Fadra; Qurayba; Umm Amir
- Tribe: Quraysh (Banu Taym)
- Religion: Islam
- Occupation: Businessman, public administrator, economist

The Caliphate of Abu Bakr refers to the tenure of Abu Bakr as the first caliph of the Muslim community following the death of the Islamic prophet Muhammad in 632 CE (11 AH). His caliphate, spanning approximately two years from 632 to 634 CE proved foundational to the subsequent history of Islam and the Rashidun Caliphate. Abu Bakr was the first of the four Rightly Guided Caliphs recognised by Sunni Islam.

During his caliphate, Abu Bakr successfully suppressed the Ridda Wars (Wars of Apostasy), consolidated Muslim authority over the Arabian Peninsula, oversaw the initial compilation of the Quran into a single manuscript, and launched early military campaigns into Byzantine Syria and Sasanian Iraq campaigns that would eventually produce one of the most rapid territorial expansions in world history under his successor Umar ibn al-Khattab.

== Background ==
Abu Bakr was born as Abdullah ibn Abi Quhafa around 573 CE in Mecca to the Banu Taym clan of the Quraysh tribe. A prosperous merchant, he was among the earliest converts to Islam and remained one of Muhammad's closest companions throughout Muhammad's life. The epithet al-Siddiq "the Truthful" or "the Testifier to Truth" was conferred upon him for his immediate acceptance of the Isra and Mi'raj (Night Journey).

Upon Muhammad's death on 8 June 632 CE, the Muslim community faced crisis of succession. Muhammad had left no designated successor. A gathering of the Ansar at the Saqifah Banu Sa'ida convened to determine leadership. Senior Companions, including Umar ibn al-Khattab and Abu Ubayda ibn al-Jarrah, arrived and argued that leadership of the community must rest with the Quraysh of Mecca because of the lineage or else the Arabia will not accept authority. Abu Bakr was subsequently nominated and accepted as caliph, with Umar and Abu Ubayda among the first to pledge allegiance (bay'ah).

== The Ridda Wars (632–633 CE) ==
The most immediate and severe challenge confronting Abu Bakr's caliphate was the widespread apostasy and tribal rebellion that erupted across Arabia following Muhammad's death. This series of conflicts is collectively known as the Ridda Wars (Wars of Apostasy). Many Arabian tribes interpreted their political and religious obligations as having been personal to Muhammad, and consequently refused to pay zakat to Medina, or rejected Islam altogether.

=== Nature of the Revolts ===
The revolts took several distinct forms. Some tribes maintained Islam but refused to remit zakat to Medina, viewing the tax as a personal compact with Muhammad. Others followed self proclaimed prophets who had emerged to challenge Muhammad's message. False prophets included Musaylima ibn Habib of the Banu Hanifa in Yamama, Tulayha ibn Khuwaylid of the Asad tribe, and Sajah bint al-Harith, a prophetess among the Tamim. A separate revolt in Yemen was led by the Abna (Persian settlers) and supported by the chieftain Qays ibn Makshuh.

=== Abu Bakr's response ===
Abu Bakr took a firm and uncompromising stance. Over the objection of some senior Companions including Umar who initially counselled leniency towards those who withheld zakat Abu Bakr declared that he would fight any tribe that distinguished between prayer and zakat, stating: "By God, I will fight whoever separates prayer from zakat." His position was that the obligations of Islam were indivisible.

He organised eleven military columns and dispatched them simultaneously to different regions of Arabia. Command of the most critical campaign against Musaylima in Yamama was entrusted to Khalid ibn al-Walid, the pre-eminent Muslim general of the era. Khalid had already subdued Tulayha at the Battle of Buzakha and then defeated the Banu Tamim, advancing methodically through northern and central Arabia.

=== Battle of Yamama (633 CE) ===
The decisive engagement of the Ridda Wars took place at Yamama in central Arabia, where Musaylima commanded the Banu Hanifa, considered the most formidable of the rebel forces. Khalid ibn al-Walid led the Muslim army in a fiercely contested battle in which the Muslims initially faced significant pressure. The turning point came when Khalid reorganised his forces and the fighting culminated in the Hadiqat al-Mawt ("Garden of Death"), a walled enclosure where Musaylima made his last stand and was killed, traditionally said to have been struck down by Wahshi ibn Harb.

The battle was extremely costly for the Muslim side. Among the dead were an estimated 360 to 700 huffaz (memorisers of the Quran), a loss that directly prompted the subsequent effort to compile the Quran in written form. With Musaylima's death, organised resistance across Arabia collapsed rapidly, and the peninsula was consolidated under Medinan authority by late 633 CE.

== Compilation of the Quran ==
Among the most enduring legacies of Abu Bakr's caliphate was initiating the first systematic compilation of the Quran into a single written manuscript. During the lifetime of Muhammad, Quranic verses had been preserved both through oral memorisation by the huffaz and through scattered written records on materials such as palm leaves, flat stones, and bones. No single bound volume existed.

The heavy losses of huffaz at the Battle of Yamama alarmed Umar ibn al-Khattab, who urged Abu Bakr to authorise a formal compilation before further losses could occur. Abu Bakr was initially reluctant, cautious about undertaking something Muhammad himself had not done. Convinced by Umar's argument, he entrusted the task to Zayd ibn Thabit, a young and highly regarded scribe who had served as one of Muhammad's own secretaries and was himself a memoriser of the Quran.

Zayd gathered written fragments and verified them against the recollections of multiple witnesses, applying a rigorous standard requiring both a written source and the testimony of two reliable witnesses for each verse. The resulting manuscript, known as the Suhuf (sheets or codex), was kept in Abu Bakr's custody and passed after his death to Umar, then to Umar's daughter Hafsa. This codex later served as the authoritative source for the standardised Uthmanic codex produced under the third caliph Uthman ibn Affan.

== Early Military Campaigns ==
=== Syria ===
In the final months of his caliphate, Abu Bakr authorised and organised the first Muslim military incursions into Byzantine-controlled Syria. In early 634 CE, four armies were dispatched under separate commanders: Abu Ubayda ibn al-Jarrah, Amr ibn al-As, Yazid ibn Abi Sufyan, and Shurahbil ibn Hasana. Each force was assigned a distinct sector of southern Syria and Palestine. Though these campaigns had not yet produced major territorial gains at the time of Abu Bakr's death, they established the strategic foundation for the sweeping conquests that followed under Umar. Khalid ibn al-Walid was subsequently redirected from Iraq to Syria to assume overall command, arriving in time to play a leading role at the Battle of Ajnadayn in July 634 CE, shortly before Abu Bakr died.

=== Iraq ===
Concurrent with the Syrian operations, Abu Bakr dispatched Khalid ibn al-Walid to raid the agriculturally rich regions of the Euphrates valley, then under Sasanian control. Khalid's campaign opened with victories at al-Kadima (Battle of the Chains), Battle of the River, and the capture of Ubulla. These raids were not yet aimed at permanent conquest but disrupted Sasanian frontier authority and brought substantial revenue and prestige to Medina. They laid the groundwork for the full conquest of Iraq that would unfold under Umar and the general Sa'd ibn Abi Waqqas.

== Administration and Governance ==
Abu Bakr's approach to governance was characterised by personal austerity and close consultation with senior Companions. He continued his trade as a cloth merchant for a period after assuming the caliphate before the community arranged a stipend from the public treasury (bayt al-mal) sufficient for his needs, a precedent that formalised the idea of the caliph as a salaried administrator rather than one who enriched himself through office.

He upheld the administrative arrangements Muhammad had established for tax collection and tribal governance, while insisting on the indivisibility of the obligations of Islam, most notably in his stance on zakat during the Ridda Wars. He is reported to have addressed the community upon assuming leadership with words emphasising accountability: "Help me if I am right; correct me if I am wrong. The weak among you shall be strong with me until I have secured his rights, if God wills; and the strong among you shall be weak with me until I have wrested from him the rights of others."

== Death and Legacy ==
Abu Bakr fell ill in Jumada al-Awwal 13 AH (approximately August 634 CE), reportedly after bathing in cold water during winter. He died on 23 August 634 CE (22 Jumada al-Thani 13 AH) at the age of approximately 61, having served as caliph for just over two years. Before his death, he designated Umar ibn al-Khattab as his successor, consulting senior Companions to secure consensus for the choice, thereby establishing a precedent that caliph can't be chosen without consensus.

He was buried beside Muhammad in the chamber of Aisha bint Abi Bakr beneath what is now Al-Masjid an-Nabawi in Medina.

Abu Bakr's caliphate, though brief, is regarded by Sunni Muslims as foundational to the survival and expansion of the early Islamic state. His suppression of the Ridda Wars preserved the political and religious unity of Arabia that made subsequent conquests possible. His initiation of the Quranic compilation is considered one of the most consequential acts in Islamic history. In Sunni tradition he is considered the foremost of the companions of Muhammad and the first of the four Rightly Guided Caliphs. Twelver Shia Muslims hold a significantly different assessment of his succession to Muhammad, considering the rightful leadership to have belonged to Ali ibn Abi Talib.
