= Hafsid–Zayyanid war =

Hafsid-Zayyanid war (1410–1424)
Date	1410–1424
Location	Algiers, Tlemcen, Algeria
Result	Hafsid victory: vassalage of the Kingdom of Tlemcen

Belligerents
Hafsid dynasty	Kingdom of Tlemcen

Commanders and leaders
Abu Faris Abd al-Aziz II; Abdulaziz	Abd el Wahid ben Abu Hammou Zenati

Strength
Unknown	Unknown

Casualties and losses
Unknown	Unknown

The Hafsid-Zayyanid war lasted from 1410, beginning with the capture of Algiers, to 1424 with the siege of Tlemcen. It led to the vassalization of the Kingdom of Tlemcen and the flight of its sultan.

== Background ==
Before this war, Abu Faris Abd al-Aziz II normalized relations with Western Christians in order to create a militia. He also fought numerous Arab dynasties and succeeded in reunifying the southern regions of Tunisia.

== War ==
Abu Faris Abd al-Aziz II captured Algiers in 1410–1411 with little difficulty and strengthened his western frontiers, which consequently marked the beginning of the war against Abd al-Wahid ben Abu Hammou Zenati.

On December 5, 1423, Abu Faris Abd al-Aziz II marched on Tlemcen and defeated the Zayyanid sultan, then installed himself in the kasbah. The Kingdom of Tlemcen was subsequently annexed by the Hafsid sultan.

== Aftermath ==
Tlemcen remained tributary until the death of the Hafsid sultan, but in reality it stayed within the Hafsid sphere of influence until the end of the 15th century.
