= Caliphate =

Islamic form of government

A caliphate (Note: Arabic: خلافة, romanized: khilāfah [xɪˈlæːfæ]) is an institution or public office under the leadership of an Islamic steward with the title of caliph (/ˈkælɪf, ˈkeɪ-/), (Note: خليفة khalīfah [xæˈliːfæ],) a person considered a political–religious successor to the Islamic prophet Muhammad and a leader of the entire Muslim world (ummah). Historically, the caliphates were polities based on Islam which developed into multi-ethnic trans-national empires.

During the medieval period, three major caliphates succeeded each other: the Rashidun Caliphate (632–661), the Umayyad Caliphate (661–750), and the Abbasid Caliphate (750–1517). In the fourth major caliphate, the Ottoman Caliphate, the rulers of the Ottoman Empire claimed caliphal authority from 1517 until the Ottoman Caliphate was formally abolished as part of the 1924 secularisation of Turkey. The Sharif of Mecca then claimed the title, but this caliphate fell quickly after its conquest by the Sultanate of Nejd (the predecessor of modern-day Saudi Arabia), leaving the claim in dormancy. Throughout the history of Islam, a few other Muslim states, almost all of which were hereditary monarchies, have claimed to be caliphates.

Not all Muslim states have had caliphates. The Sunni branch of Islam stipulates that, as a head of state, a caliph should be elected by Muslims or their representatives. Shia Muslims believe a caliph should be an imam chosen by God from the Ahl al-Bayt (the 'Household of the Prophet'). Some caliphates in history have been led by Shia Muslims, like the Fatimid Caliphate (909–1171). From the late 20th century towards the early 21st century, in the wake of the invasion of Afghanistan by the USSR, the war on terror and the Arab Spring, various Islamist groups have claimed the caliphate, although these claims have usually been widely rejected among Muslims; the most notable example of this being the Islamic State led by Abu Bakr al-Baghdadi which declared a caliphate in its territory in Iraq and Syria in 2014.

== Etymology ==
Before the advent of Islam, Arabian monarchs traditionally used the title malik 'king', or another from the same Semitic root. The term caliph (/ˈkeɪlɪf, ˈkælɪf/) derives from the Arabic word khalīfah (خليفة,), meaning 'successor', 'steward', or 'deputy', and has traditionally been considered a shortening of Khalīfah rasūl Allāh 'successor of the messenger of God'. However, studies of pre-Islamic texts suggest that the original meaning of the phrase was 'successor selected by God'.

== History ==
=== Rashidun Caliphate (632–661) ===
==== Succession to Muhammad ====
In the immediate aftermath of the death of Muhammad, a gathering of the Ansar (natives of Medina) took place in the saqifa (courtyard) of the Banu Sa'ida clan. The meeting was thought to have convened so the Ansar could decide on a new leader of the Muslim community among themselves, with the intentional exclusion of the Muhajirun (migrants from Mecca), though this later became the subject of debate.

Nevertheless, Abu Bakr and Umar, both prominent companions of Muhammad, upon learning of the meeting became concerned of a potential coup and hastened to the gathering. Upon arriving, Abu Bakr addressed the assembled men with a warning that an attempt to elect a leader outside of Muhammad's own tribe, the Quraysh, would likely result in dissension as only they can command the necessary respect among the community. He then took Umar and another companion, Abu Ubayda ibn al-Jarrah, by the hand and offered them to the Ansar as potential choices. He was countered with the suggestion that the Quraysh and the Ansar choose a leader each from among themselves, who would then rule jointly. The group grew heated upon hearing this proposal and began to argue among themselves. Umar hastily took Abu Bakr's hand and swore his allegiance to the latter, an example followed by the gathered men.

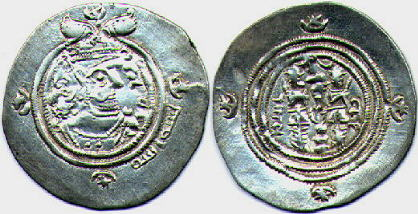
First picture; Sasanid style coins during Rashidun, (Pahlavi scripts, crescent-star, fire altar, depictions of Khosrow II, bismillāh in margin). Unlike known historical figures such as Ibn Zubayr and Mu'awiya I, there are no coins minted in the names of caliphs titled rashidun as evidence of political dominancy. Second picture; A Byzantine style coin with depictions of the Constans II holding the cross-tipped staff and globus cruciger pointing out there was no specific Islamic-religious identity with sharp boundaries in the early Islamic period.

Abu Bakr was near-universally accepted as head of the Muslim community (under the title of caliph) as a result of Saqifah, though he did face contention as a result of the rushed nature of the event. Several companions, most prominent among them being Ali ibn Abi Talib, initially refused to acknowledge his authority. Ali may have been reasonably expected to assume leadership, being both cousin and son-in-law to Muhammad. The theologian Ibrahim al-Nakha'i stated that Ali also had support among the Ansar for his succession, explained by the genealogical links he shared with them. Whether his candidacy for the succession was raised during Saqifah is unknown, though it is not unlikely. Abu Bakr later sent Umar to confront Ali to gain his allegiance, resulting in an altercation which may have involved violence. However, after six months, the group made peace with Abu Bakr and Ali offered him his fealty.

==== Rashidun caliphs ====
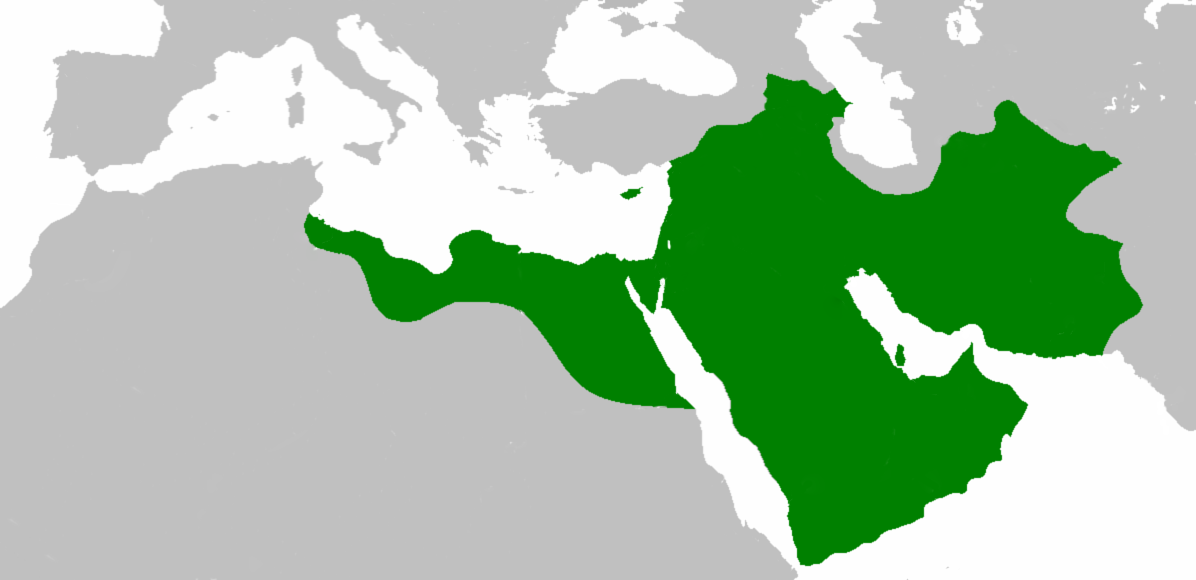
Rashidun Caliphate at its greatest extent under Uthman

Abu Bakr nominated Umar as his successor on his deathbed. Umar, the second caliph, was killed by a Persian slave called Abu Lu'lu'a Firuz. His successor, Uthman, was elected by a council of electors (majlis). Uthman was killed by members of a disaffected group. Ali then took control but was not universally accepted as caliph. He faced two major rebellions and was assassinated following a tumultuous rule that lasted only five years. This period is known as the Fitna, or the first Islamic civil war. The followers of Ali later became the Shi'a ("shiaat Ali", partisans of Ali.) minority sect of Islam and reject the legitimacy of the first three caliphs. Those who accepted all four Rāshidun Caliphs (Abu Bakr, Umar, Uthman and Ali) became the majority Sunni sect.

Under the Rāshidun, each region (Sultanate, Wilayah, or Emirate) of the caliphate had its own governor (Sultan, Wāli or Emir). Muāwiyah, a relative of Uthman and governor (wali) of Syria, succeeded Ali as caliph. Muāwiyah transformed the caliphate into a hereditary office, thus founding the Umayyad dynasty.

In areas which were previously under Sasanian Empire or Byzantine rule, the caliphs lowered taxes, provided greater local autonomy (to their delegated governors), greater religious freedom for Jews and some indigenous Christians, and brought peace to peoples demoralised and disaffected by the casualties and heavy taxation that had resulted from the decades of Byzantine–Persian warfare.

=== Ali's caliphate, Hasan and the rise of the Umayyads ===
Ali's reign was plagued by turmoil and internal strife, culminating in the Battle of Siffin. The battle lasted several months, resulting in a stalemate. To avoid further bloodshed, Ali agreed to negotiate with Mu'awiyah. This caused a faction of approximately 4,000 people, who would come to be known as the Kharijites, to abandon the fight. After defeating the Kharijites at the Battle of Nahrawan, Ali was later assassinated by the Kharijite Ibn Muljam. Ali's son Hasan was proclaimed the next caliph, but abdicated in favour of Mu'awiyah a few months later to avoid any conflict within the Muslims. Mu'awiyah became the sixth caliph, establishing the Umayyad dynasty.

=== Umayyad Caliphate (661–750) ===
The caliphate, 622–750 Expansion under Muhammad, 622–632 Expansion during the Rashidun Caliphs, 632–661 Expansion during the Umayyad Caliphate, 661–750

Beginning with the Umayyads, the title of the caliph became hereditary. Under the Umayyads, the caliphate grew rapidly in territory, incorporating the Caucasus, Transoxiana, Sindh, the Maghreb and most of the Iberian Peninsula (Al-Andalus) into the Muslim world. At its greatest extent, the Umayyad Caliphate covered approximately 5 million square miles (approximately 13 million square kilometres), making it larger than the earlier Roman Empire or contemporary Tang China.

Geographically, the empire was divided into several provinces, the borders of which changed a number of times during the Umayyad reign. Each province had a governor appointed by the caliph. However, for a variety of reasons, including that they were not elected by Shura and suggestions of impious behaviour, the Umayyad dynasty was not universally supported within the Muslim community. Some supported prominent early Muslims like Zubayr ibn al-Awwam; others felt that only members of Muhammad's clan, the Banu Hashim, or his own lineage, the descendants of Ali, should rule.

There were multiple rebellions against the Umayyads, as well as splits within the Umayyad ranks (notably, the Qays–Yaman rivalry). At the command of Yazid I, an army led by Umar ibn Sa'd and Shimr ibn Dhi 'l-Jawshan killed Ali's son Husayn ibn Ali and his family at the Battle of Karbala in 680, solidifying the Shia-Sunni split. Eventually, supporters of the Banu Hashim and the supporters of the lineage of Ali united to bring down the Umayyads in 750. However, the Shi‘at ‘Alī, "the Party of Ali", were again disappointed when the Abbasid dynasty took power, as the Abbasids were descended from Muhammad's uncle, ‘Abbas ibn ‘Abd al-Muttalib and not from Ali.

=== Abbasid Caliphate (750–1517) ===
==== Abbasid caliphs at Baghdad ====
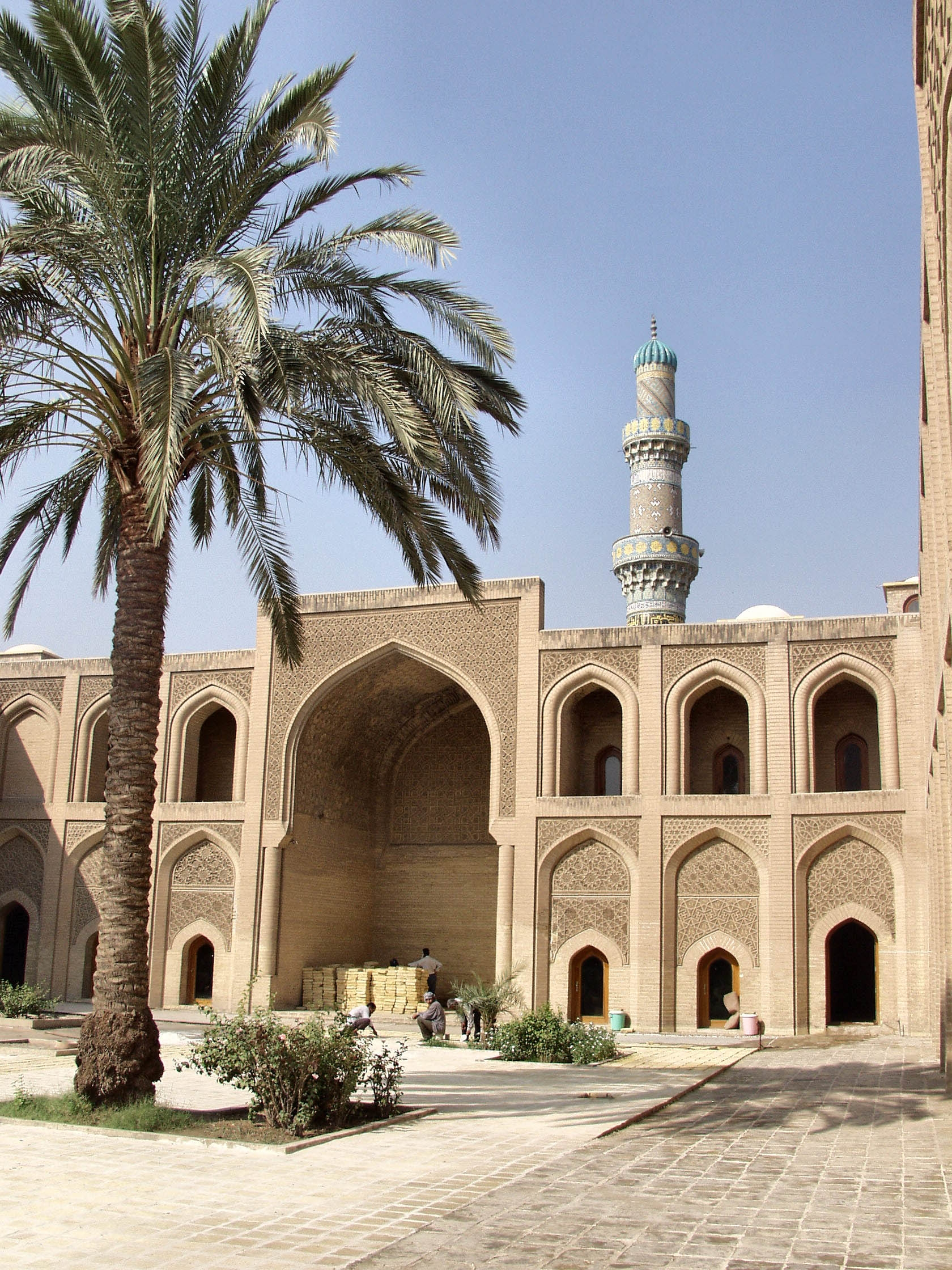
Mustansiriya Madrasah in Baghdad

In 750, the Umayyad dynasty was overthrown by another family of Meccan origin, the Abbasids. Their time represented a scientific, cultural and religious flowering. Islamic art and music also flourished significantly during their reign. Their major city and capital Baghdad began to flourish as a center of knowledge, culture and trade. This period of cultural fruition ended in 1258 with the sack of Baghdad by the Mongols under Hulagu Khan. The Abbasid Caliphate had, however, lost its effective power outside Iraq already by c. 920. By 945, the loss of power became official when the Buyids conquered Baghdad and all of Iraq. The empire fell apart and its parts were ruled for the next century by local dynasties.

In the ninth century, the Abbasids created an army loyal only to their caliphate, composed predominantly of Turkic Cuman, Circassian and Georgian slave origin known as Mamluks. By 1250 the Mamluks came to power in Egypt. The Mamluk army, though often viewed negatively, both helped and hurt the caliphate. Early on, it provided the government with a stable force to address domestic and foreign problems. However, creation of this foreign army and al-Mu'tasim's transfer of the capital from Baghdad to Samarra created a division between the caliphate and the peoples they claimed to rule. In addition, the power of the Mamluks steadily grew until Ar-Radi (934–941) was constrained to hand over most of the royal functions to Muhammad ibn Ra'iq.

==== Under the Mamluk Sultanate of Cairo (1261–1517) ====
In 1261, following the Mongol conquest of Baghdad, the Mamluk rulers of Egypt tried to gain legitimacy for their rule by declaring the re-establishment of the Abbasid Caliphate in Cairo. The Abbasid caliphs in Egypt had no political power; they continued to maintain the symbols of authority, but their sway was confined to religious matters. The first Abbasid caliph of Cairo was Al-Mustansir (r. June–November 1261). The Abbasid Caliphate of Cairo lasted until the time of Al-Mutawakkil III, who ruled as caliph from 1508 to 1516, then he was deposed briefly in 1516 by his predecessor Al-Mustamsik, but was restored again to the caliphate in 1517.

The Ottoman sultan Selim I defeated the Mamluk Sultanate and made Egypt part of the Ottoman Empire in 1517. Al-Mutawakkil III was captured together with his family and transported to Constantinople as a prisoner where he had a ceremonial role. He died in 1543, following his return to Cairo.

==== Parallel regional caliphates in the later Abbasid era ====
The Abbasid dynasty lost effective power over much of the Muslim realm by the first half of the tenth century.

The Umayyad dynasty, which had survived and come to rule over Al-Andalus, reclaimed the title of caliph in 929, lasting until it was overthrown in 1031.

===== Umayyad Caliphate of Córdoba (929–1031) =====
Map of the Caliphate of Cordoba c. 1000

During the Umayyad dynasty, the Iberian Peninsula was an integral province of the Umayyad Caliphate ruling from Damascus. The Umayyads lost the position of caliph in Damascus in 750, and Abd al-Rahman I became Emir of Córdoba in 756 after six years in exile. Intent on regaining power, he defeated the existing Islamic rulers of the area who defied Umayyad rule and united various local fiefdoms into an emirate.

Rulers of the emirate used the title "emir" or "sultan" until the tenth century, when Abd al-Rahman III was faced with the threat of invasion by the Fatimid Caliphate. To aid his fight against the invading Fatimids, who claimed the caliphate in opposition to the generally recognised Abbasid caliph of Baghdad, Al-Mu'tadid, Abd al-Rahman III claimed the title of caliph himself. This helped Abd al-Rahman III gain prestige with his subjects, and the title was retained after the Fatimids were repulsed. The rule of the caliphate is considered as the heyday of Muslim presence in the Iberian Peninsula, before it fragmented into various taifas in the eleventh century. This period was characterised by a flourishing in technology, trade and culture; a number of the buildings of al-Andalus were constructed in this period.

===== Almohad Caliphate (1147–1269) =====
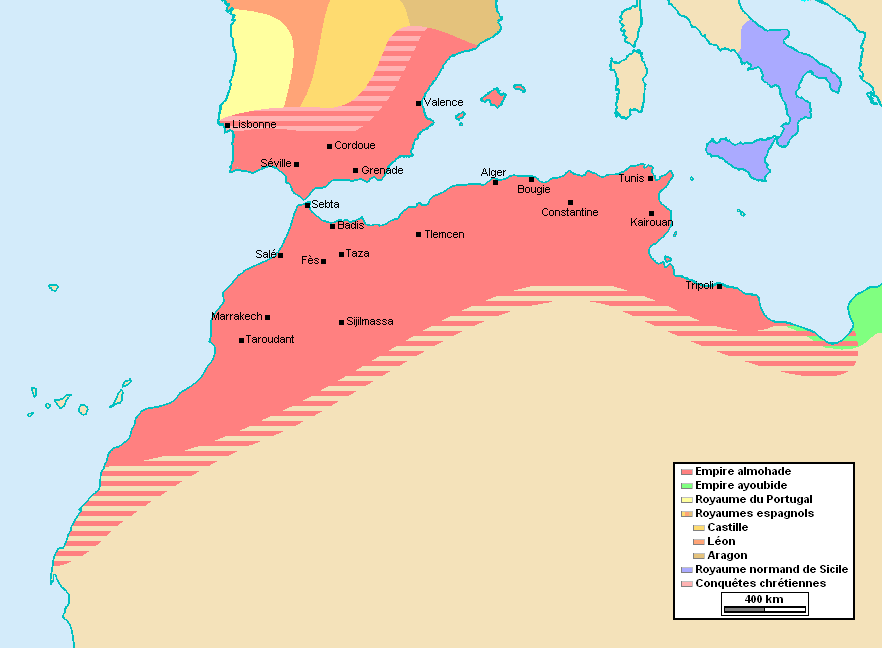
The Almohad Empire at its greatest extent, c. 1180–1212

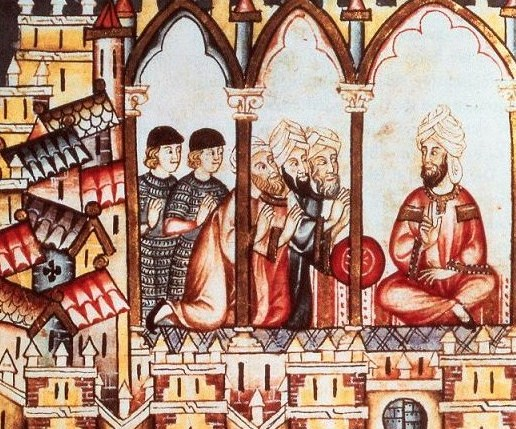
Castilian ambassadors meeting Almohad caliph Abu Hafs Umar al-Murtada

The Almohad Caliphate (Berber languages: Imweḥḥden, from الموحدون al-Muwaḥḥidun, "the Monotheists" or "the Unifiers") was a Moroccan Berber Muslim movement founded in the 12th century.

The Almohad movement was started by Ibn Tumart among the Masmuda tribes of southern Morocco. The Almohads first established a Berber state in Tinmel in the Atlas Mountains in roughly 1120. The Almohads succeeded in overthrowing the Almoravid dynasty in governing Morocco by 1147, when Abd al-Mu'min (r. 1130–1163) conquered Marrakech and declared himself caliph. They then extended their power over all of the Maghreb by 1159. Al-Andalus followed the fate of Africa, and all Islamic Iberia was under Almohad rule by 1172.

The Almohad dominance of Iberia continued until 1212, when Muhammad al-Nasir (1199–1214) was defeated at the Battle of Las Navas de Tolosa in the Sierra Morena by an alliance of the Christian princes of Castile, Aragon, Navarre and Portugal. Nearly all of the Moorish dominions in Iberia were lost soon after, with the great Moorish cities of Córdoba and Seville falling to the Christians in 1236 and 1248, respectively.

The Almohads continued to rule in northern Africa until the piecemeal loss of territory through the revolt of tribes and districts enabled the rise of their most effective enemies, the Marinid dynasty, in 1215. The last representative of the line, Idris al-Wathiq, was reduced to the possession of Marrakesh, where he was murdered by a slave in 1269; the Marinids seized Marrakesh, ending the Almohad domination of the Western Maghreb.

===== Hafsid Caliphate (1253–1574) =====
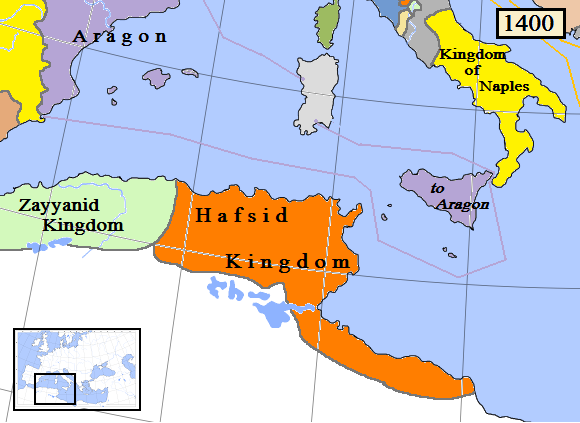
Hafsid Caliphate in 1400

The Hafsids had been governors of Ifriqiya for the Almohads but declared their independence in 1229. They claimed the succession of the Almohad Empire and their descent from Rashidun caliph Omar. The second independent Hafsid ruler Muhammad I al-Mustansir (r. 1249–1277) declared himself caliph in 1253 and under his reign, the caliphate reached a peak. After the fall of Baghdad, Marinid sultan Abu Yusuf Yaqub of Morocco, Sharif of Mecca Abu Numayy and Emir of Granada Muhammad recognized the Hafsids in 1258, 1259 and 1264 respectively. They were also potentially recognised by the Mamluks in 1260. In the mid-14th century, Morocco invaded the caliphate. The Hafsids would return to great power with Abu Faris Abd al-Aziz II (r. 1394–1434) and Abu 'Amr 'Uthman (r. 1435–1488). Between 1535 and 1574, the caliphate was caught between the Ottoman and Spanish fronts and became a protectorate until it was conquered by the Ottoman Caliphate.

=== Fatimid Caliphate (909–1171) ===
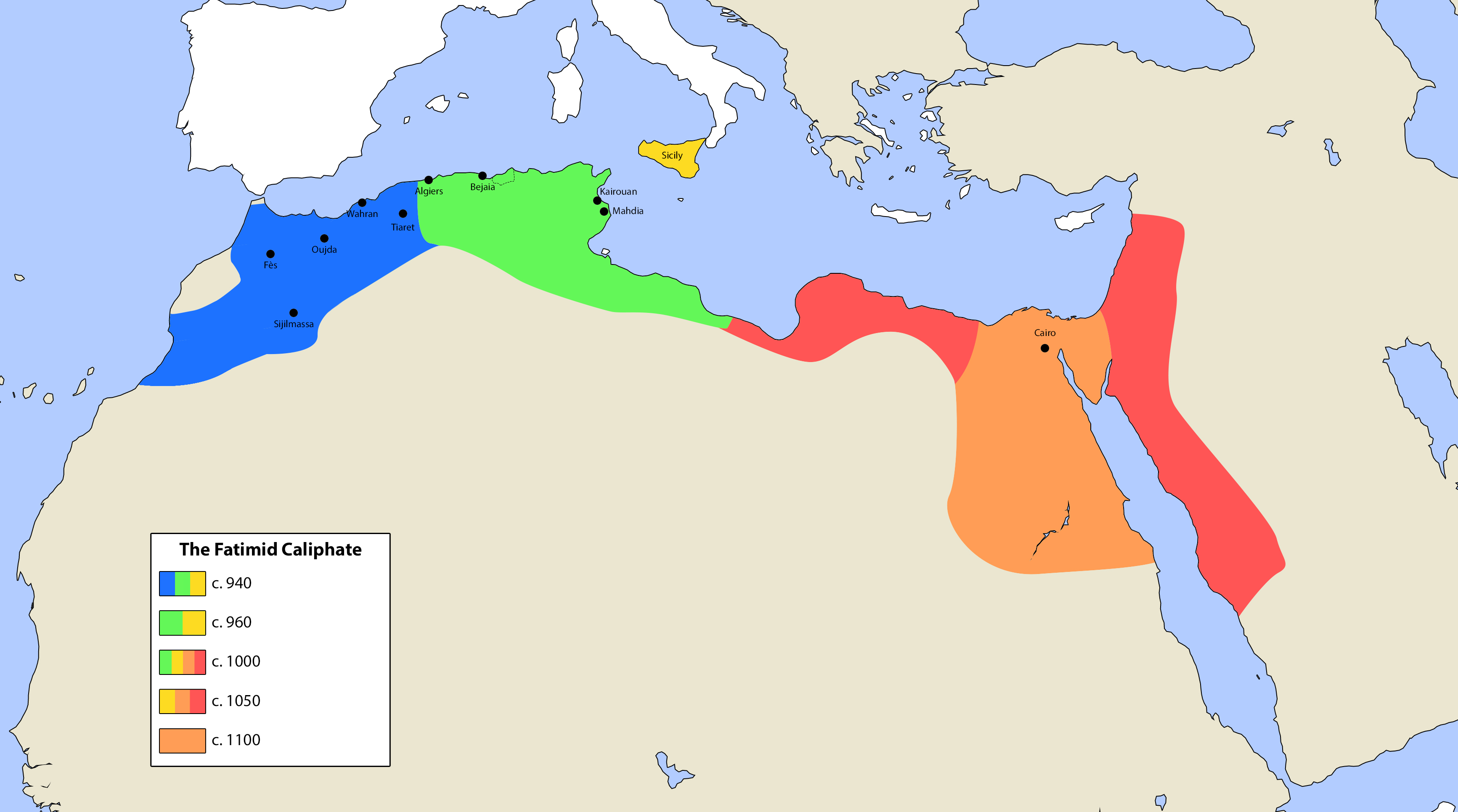
Map of the Fatimid Caliphate at its largest extent in the early eleventh century

The Fatimid Caliphate was an Isma'ili Shi'i caliphate, originally based in Tunisia, that extended its rule across the Mediterranean coast of Africa and ultimately made Egypt the centre of its caliphate. At its height, in addition to Egypt, the caliphate included varying areas of the Maghreb, Sicily, the Levant and the Hejaz.

The Fatimids established the Tunisian city of Mahdia and made it their capital city, before conquering Egypt and building the city of Cairo there in 969. Thereafter, Cairo became the capital of the caliphate, with Egypt becoming the political, cultural and religious centre of the state. Islam scholar Louis Massignon dubbed the fourth century AH /tenth century CE as the "Ismaili century in the history of Islam".

The term Fatimite is sometimes used to refer to the citizens of this caliphate. The ruling elite of the state belonged to the Ismaili branch of Shi'ism. The leaders of the dynasty were Ismaili imams and had a religious significance to Ismaili Muslims. They are also part of the chain of holders of the office of the caliphate, as recognised by some Muslims. Therefore, this constitutes a rare period in history in which the descendants of Ali (hence the name Fatimid, referring to Ali's wife Fatima) and the caliphate were united to any degree, excepting the final period of the Rashidun Caliphate under Ali himself.

The caliphate was reputed to exercise a degree of religious tolerance towards non-Ismaili sects of Islam as well as towards Jews, Maltese Christians and Copts.

The Shia Ubayd Allah al-Mahdi Billah of the Fatimid dynasty, who claimed descent from Muhammad through his daughter, claimed the title of caliph in 909, creating a separate line of caliphs in North Africa. Initially controlling Algeria, Tunisia and Libya, the Fatimid caliphs extended their rule for the next 150 years, taking Egypt and Palestine, before the Abbasid dynasty was able to turn the tide, limiting Fatimid rule to Egypt. The Fatimid dynasty finally ended in 1171 and was overtaken by Saladin of the Ayyubid dynasty.

=== Ottoman Caliphate (1517–1924) ===
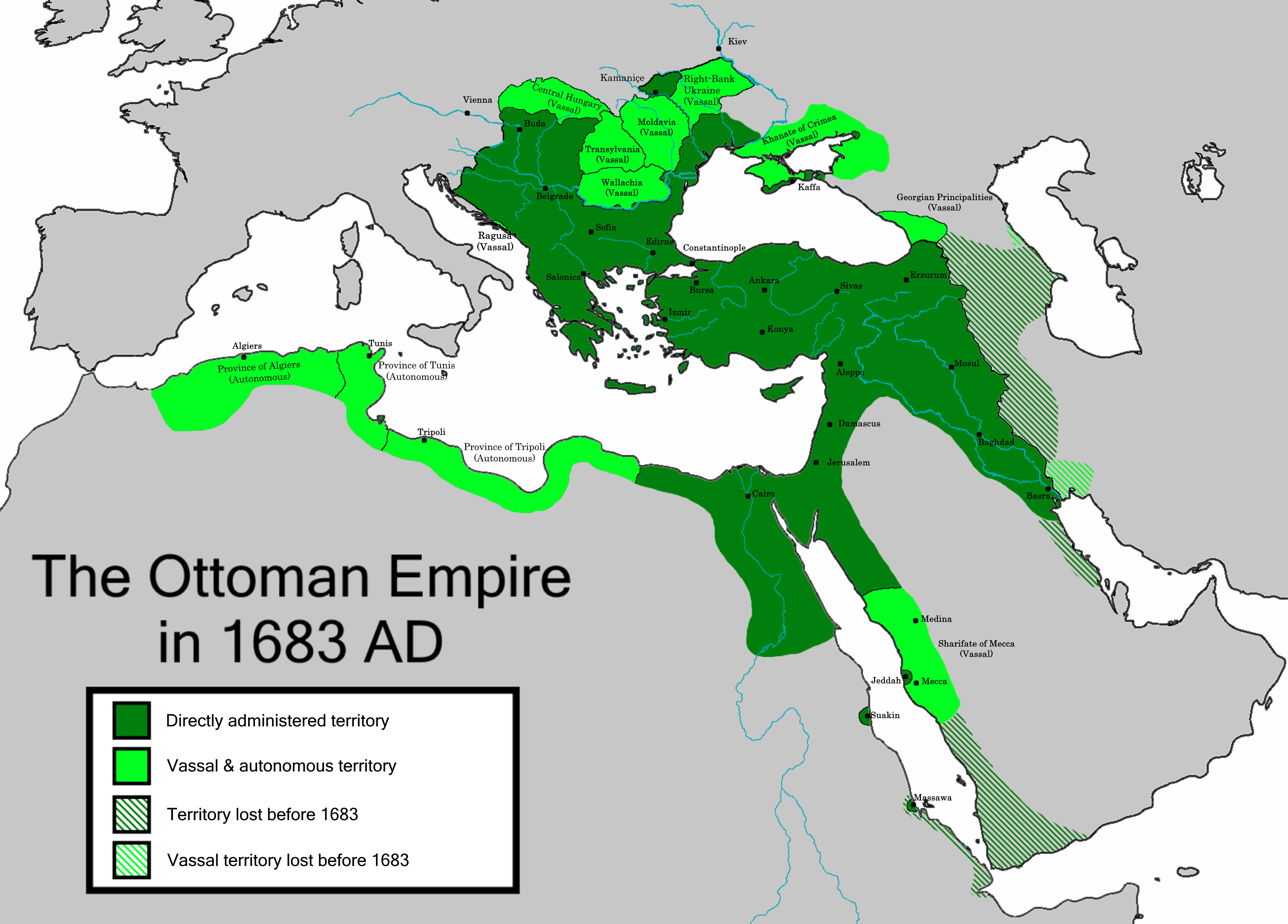
The Ottoman Empire at its greatest extent in 1683, under Sultan Mehmed IV

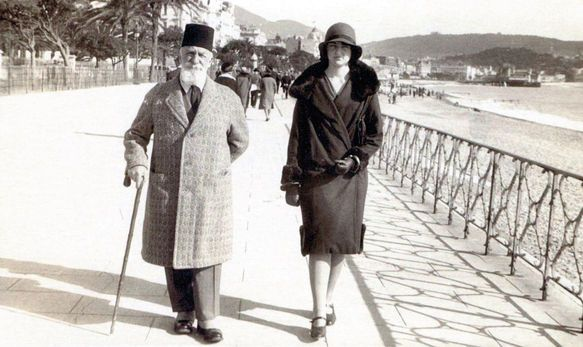
Abdulmejid II, the last caliph of Sunni Islam from the Ottoman dynasty, with his daughter Dürrüşehvar Sultan

The caliphate was claimed by the sultans of the Ottoman Empire beginning with Murad I (reigned 1362 to 1389), while recognising no authority on the part of the Abbasid caliphs of the Mamluk-ruled Cairo. Hence the seat of the caliphate moved to the Ottoman capital of Edirne. In 1453, after Mehmed the Conqueror's conquest of Constantinople, the seat of the Ottomans moved to Constantinople, present-day Istanbul. In 1517, the Ottoman sultan Selim I defeated and annexed the Mamluk Sultanate of Cairo into his empire. The Ottomans defied the Hadiths that state that the Imam or Caliph has to be from the Quraysh tribe, which was the norm until the overthrow of the Abbasid caliphate by the Ottomans who claimed the caliphate. Through conquering and unifying Muslim lands, Selim I became the defender of the holy cities of Mecca and Medina, which further strengthened the Ottoman claim to the caliphate in the Muslim world. Ottomans gradually came to be viewed as the de facto leaders and representatives of the Islamic world. However, the earlier Ottoman caliphs did not officially bear the title of caliph in their documents of state, inscriptions, or coinage. It was only in the late eighteenth century that the claim to the caliphate was discovered by the sultans to have a practical use, since it allowed them to counter Russian claims to protect Ottoman Christians with their own claim to protect Muslims under Russian rule.

The outcome of the Russo-Turkish War of 1768–1774 was disastrous for the Ottomans. Large territories, including those with large Muslim populations, such as Crimea, were lost to the Russian Empire. However, the Ottomans under Abdul Hamid I claimed a diplomatic victory by being allowed to remain the religious leaders of Muslims in the now-independent Crimea as part of the peace treaty; in return Russia became the official protector of Christians in Ottoman territory. According to Barthold, the first time the title of "caliph" was used as a political instead of symbolic religious title by the Ottomans was the Treaty of Küçük Kaynarca with the Russian Empire in 1774, when the Empire retained moral authority on territory whose sovereignty was ceded to the Russian Empire. The British would tactfully affirm the Ottoman claim to the caliphate and proceed to have the Ottoman caliph issue orders to the Muslims living in British India to comply with the British government.

The British supported and propagated the view that the Ottomans were caliphs of Islam among Muslims in British India, and the Ottoman sultans helped the British by issuing pronouncements to the Muslims of India telling them to support British rule from Sultan Selim III and Sultan Abdulmejid I.

Around 1880, Sultan Abdul Hamid II reasserted the title as a way of countering Russian expansion into Muslim lands. His claim was most fervently accepted by the Sunni Muslims of British India. By the eve of World War I, the Ottoman state, despite its weakness relative to Europe, represented the largest and most powerful independent Islamic political entity. The sultan also enjoyed some authority beyond the borders of his shrinking empire as caliph of Muslims in Egypt, India and Central Asia.

In 1899, John Hay, U.S. Secretary of State, asked the American ambassador to Ottoman Turkey, Oscar Straus, to approach Sultan Abdul Hamid II to use his position as caliph to order the Tausūg people of the Sultanate of Sulu in the Philippines to submit to American suzerainty and American military rule; the Sultan obliged them and wrote the letter which was sent to Sulu via Mecca. As a result, the "Sulu Mohammedans ... refused to join the insurrectionists and had placed themselves under the control of our army, thereby recognizing American sovereignty."

==== Abolition of the Caliphate (1924) ====
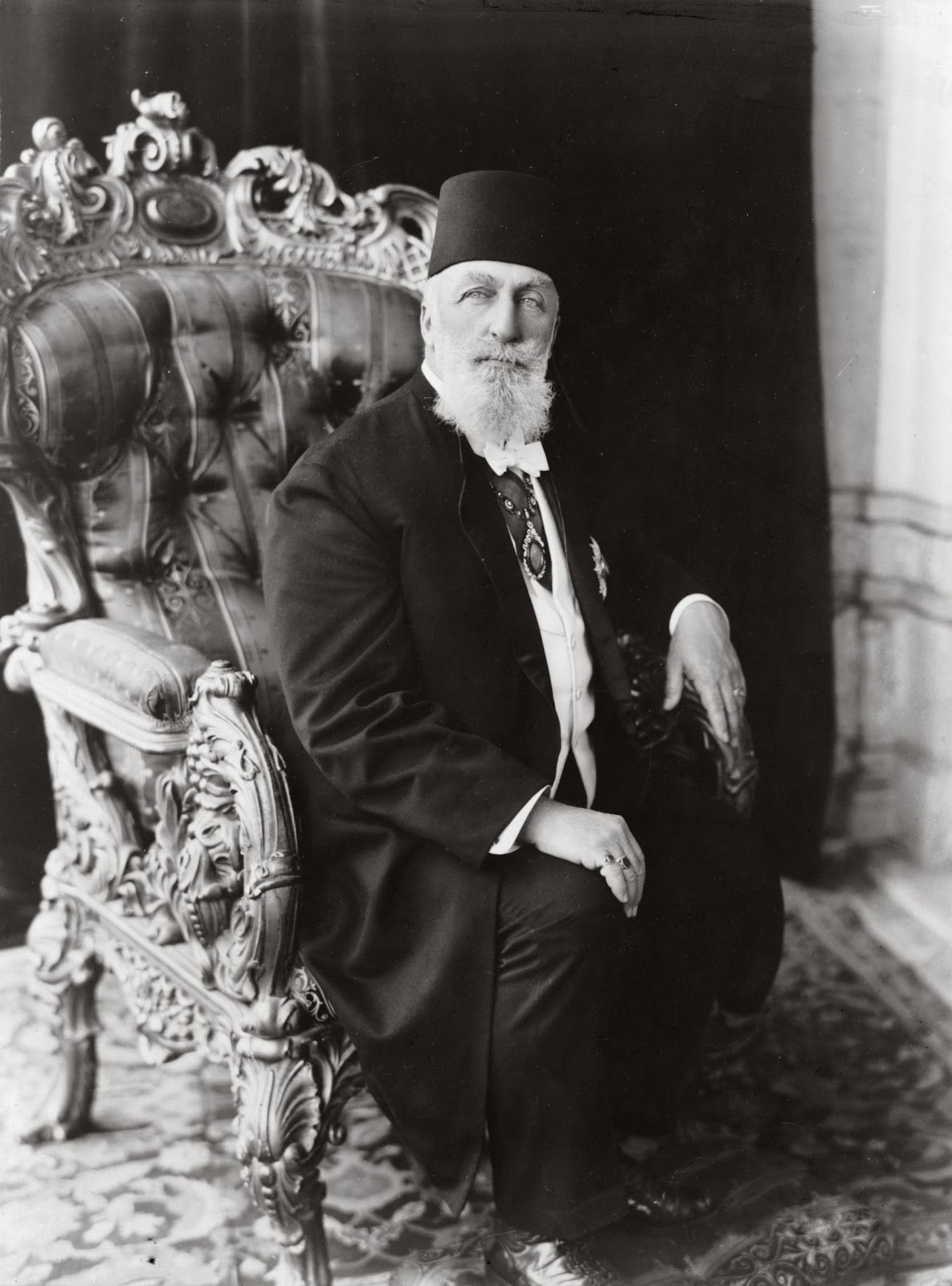
Official portrait of Abdulmejid II as caliph

After the Armistice of Mudros of October 1918 with the military occupation of Constantinople and Treaty of Versailles (1919), the position of the Ottomans was uncertain. The movement to protect or restore the Ottomans gained force after the Treaty of Sèvres (August 1920) which imposed the partitioning of the Ottoman Empire and gave Greece a powerful position in Anatolia, to the distress of the Turks. They called for help and the movement was the result. The movement had collapsed by late 1922.

On 3 March 1924, the first president of the Turkish Republic, Mustafa Kemal Atatürk, as part of his reforms, constitutionally abolished the institution of the caliphate. Atatürk offered the caliphate to Ahmed Sharif as-Senussi, on the condition that he reside outside Turkey; Senussi declined the offer and confirmed his support for Abdulmejid. The title was then claimed by Hussein bin Ali, Sharif of Mecca and Hejaz, leader of the Arab Revolt, but his kingdom was defeated and annexed by ibn Saud in 1925.

Egyptian scholar Ali Abdel Raziq published his 1925 book Islam and the Foundations of Governance. The argument of this book has been summarised as "Islam does not advocate a specific form of government". He focussed his criticism both at those who use religious law as contemporary political proscription and at the history of rulers claiming legitimacy by the caliphate. Raziq wrote that past rulers spread the notion of religious justification for the caliphate "so that they could use religion as a shield protecting their thrones against the attacks of rebels".

A summit was convened at Cairo in 1926 to discuss the revival of the caliphate, but most Muslim countries did not participate, and no action was taken to implement the summit's resolutions. Though the title Ameer al-Mumineen was adopted by the King of Morocco and by Mohammed Omar, former head of the Taliban of Afghanistan, neither claimed any legal standing or authority over Muslims outside the borders of their respective countries.

Since the end of the Ottoman Empire, occasional demonstrations have been held calling for the re-establishment of the caliphate. Organisations which call for the re-establishment of the caliphate include Hizb ut-Tahrir and the Muslim Brotherhood. The AKP government in Turkey, a former Muslim Brotherhood ally who has adopted Neo-Ottomanist policies throughout its rule, has been accused of intending to restore the caliphate.

===== Khilafat Movement (1919–1924) =====
The Khilafat Movement was launched by Muslims in British India in 1920 to defend the Ottoman Caliphate at the end of the First World War and it spread throughout the British colonial territories. It was strong in British India where it formed a rallying point for some Indian Muslims as one of many anti-British Indian political movements. Its leaders included Mohammad Ali Jouhar, his brother Shawkat Ali and Maulana Abul Kalam Azad, Dr. Mukhtar Ahmed Ansari, Hakim Ajmal Khan and Barrister Muhammad Jan Abbasi. For a time it was supported by Mohandas Karamchand Gandhi, who was a member of the Central Khilafat Committee. However, the movement lost its momentum after the abolition of the caliphate in 1924. After further arrests and flight of its leaders, and a series of offshoots splintered off from the main organisation, the Movement eventually died down and disbanded.

==== Parallel regional caliphates to the Ottomans ====
===== Indian subcontinent =====
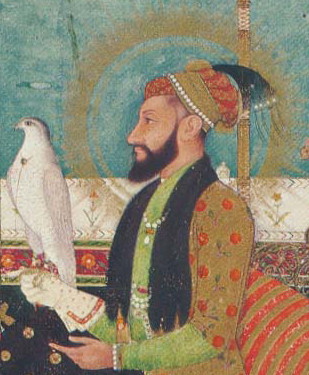
Hafiz Muhiuddin Aurangzeb, unlike his predecessors, was considered to be a caliph of India.

After the Umayyad campaigns in India and the conquest on small territories of the western part of the Indian peninsula, early Indian Muslim dynasties were founded by the Ghurid dynasty and the Ghaznavids, most notably the Delhi Sultanate. The Indian sultanates did not extensively strive for a caliphate since the Ottoman Empire was already observing the caliphate.

The emperors of the Mughal Empire, who were the only Sunni rulers whose territory and wealth could compete with that of the Ottomans, started assuming the title of caliph and calling their capital as the Dar-ul-khilafat ('abode of the caliphate') since the time of the third emperor Akbar like their Timurid ancestors. A gold coin struck under Akbar called him the "great sultan, the exalted khalifah". Although the Mughals did not acknowledge the overlordship of Ottomans, they nevertheless used the title of caliph to honour them in diplomatic exchanges. Akbar's letter to Suleiman the Magnificent addressed the latter as having attained the rank of the caliphate, while calling Akbar's empire as the "Khilafat of realms of Hind and Sind." The fifth emperor Shah Jahan also laid claim to the Caliphate. Although the Mughal Empire is not recognised as a caliphate, its sixth emperor Aurangzeb has often been regarded as one of the few Islamic caliphs to have ruled the Indian peninsula. He received support from the Ottoman sultans such as Suleiman II and Mehmed IV. As a memoriser of Quran, Aurangzeb fully established sharia in South Asia via his Fatawa 'Alamgiri. He re-introduced jizya and banned Islamically unlawful activities. However, Aurangzeb's personal expenses were covered by his own incomes, which included the sewing of caps and trade of his written copies of the Quran. Thus, he has been compared to the second caliph, Umar bin Khattab, and Kurdish conqueror Saladin. The Mughal emperors continued to be addressed as caliphs until the reign of Shah Alam II.

Other notable rulers such as Muhammad bin Bakhtiyar Khalji, Alauddin Khilji, Firuz Shah Tughlaq, Shamsuddin Ilyas Shah, Babur, Sher Shah Suri, Nasir I of Kalat, Tipu Sultan, Nawabs of Bengal, and the Khwaja Salimullah were popularly given the term khalifa.

===== West Africa =====
Several rulers of West Africa adopted the title of caliph. Mai Ali I Gaji (r. c. 1470 – c. 1503) was the first ruler of Bornu Empire to assume the title. Askia Mohammad I of Songhai Empire also assumed the title around the same time. The Bornu mais (emperors) held the title of caliph until 1846, when the mais were replaced with a new lineage of rulers who adopted the title shehu (sheikh).

The Sokoto Caliphate (1804–1903) was an Islamic state in what is now Nigeria led by Usman dan Fodio. Founded during the Fulani War in the early nineteenth century, it controlled one of the most powerful empires in sub-Saharan Africa prior to European conquest and colonisation culminating in the Adamawa Wars and the Battle of Kano. The caliphate remained extant through the colonial period and afterwards, though with reduced power. The current head of the Sokoto Caliphate is Sa'adu Abubakar.

The Toucouleur Empire (1848–1893), also known as the Tukular Empire, was one of the Fulani jihad states in sub-saharan Africa. It was eventually pacified and annexed by the French Republic, being incorporated into French West Africa. Additionally, the Massina Empire (1818–1862) joined these jihad states in West Africa and claimed to be a caliphate.

===== Yogyakarta Caliphate (1755–2015) =====
The Indonesian sultan of Yogyakarta historically used Khalifatullah (Caliph of God) as one of his titles. In 2015 sultan Hamengkubuwono X renounced any claim to the caliphate to facilitate his daughter's inheritance of the throne, as the theological opinion of the time was that a woman may hold the secular office of sultan but not the spiritual office of caliph.

===== Moroccan Caliphate =====
France planned to appoint sultan Yusef of Morocco, who served as the leader of the French protectorate in Morocco, as their "Caliph of the West" to strengthen their control over their colonies in Africa and the Middle East after the 1914 Ottoman jihad proclamation. As part of the Alawi dynasty, he claimed to be a descendant of Fatima. France abandoned the plan in the Sykes–Picot Agreement in 1916 which gave Britain free hand in creating their own caliphate in Arabia which also never came to fruition.

===== Sharifian Caliphate (1924–1931) =====
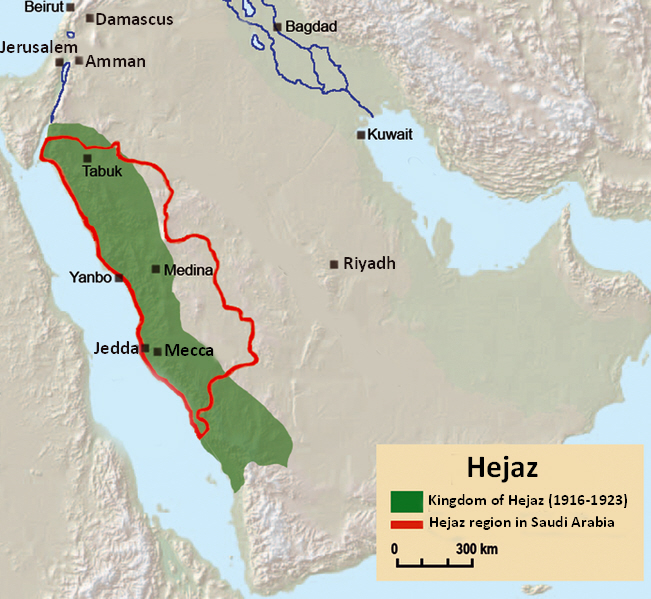
The Kingdom of Hejaz, which would become the Sharifian Caliphate in green, and the current region in red

The Sharifian Caliphate (Arabic: خلافة شريفية) was an Arab caliphate proclaimed by the Sharifian rulers of Hejaz in 1924 previously known as Vilayet Hejaz, declaring independence from the Ottoman Caliphate. The idea of the Sharifian Caliphate had been floating around since at least the fifteenth century. In the Arab world, it represented the culmination of a long struggle to reclaim the caliphate from Ottoman hands. The first Arab revolts challenging the validity of the Ottoman Caliphate and demanding that an Arab Sayyid be chosen as caliph can be traced back to 1883 when Sheikh Hamat-al-Din seized Sanaa and called for the caliphate as a Sayyid.

However, it was not until the end of the Ottoman Caliphate, abolished by the Kemalists, that Hussein bin Ali was proclaimed caliph in March 1924. His stance towards the Ottoman Caliphate was ambiguous, and while he was hostile to it, he preferred to wait for its official abolition before assuming the title, so as not to break the Ummah by creating a second caliph alongside the Ottoman caliph. He also supported financially the late Ottoman dynasty in exile, to avoid them being ruined.

His caliphate was opposed by the British Empire, Zionists, and Wahhabis, but he received support from a large part of the Muslim population at the time, as well as from Mehmed VI. Although he lost the Hejaz and was exiled, then imprisoned by the British on Cyprus, Hussein continued to use the title until his death in 1931.

== Non-political caliphates ==
Though non-political, some Sufi orders and the Ahmadiyya movement define themselves as caliphates. Their leaders are thus commonly referred to as khalifas (caliphs).

=== Sufi caliphates ===
In Sufism, tariqas (orders) are led by spiritual leaders (khilafah ruhaniyyah), the main khalifas, who nominate local khalifas to organise zaouias. Sufi caliphates are not necessarily hereditary. Khalifas are aimed to serve the silsilah in relation to spiritual responsibilities and to propagate the teachings of the tariqa.

=== Ahmadiyya Caliphate (1908–present) ===
The Ahmadiyya flag, first designed in 1939, during the leadership of the Second Caliph

The Ahmadiyya Muslim Community is an Islamic revivalist movement founded in 1889 by Mirza Ghulam Ahmad of Qadian, India, who claimed to be the promised Messiah and Mahdi. He also claimed to be a follower-prophet subordinate to Muhammad.

After Ahmad's death in 1908, his first successor, Hakeem Noor-ud-Din, became the caliph of the community and assumed the title of Khalifatul Masih (Successor or Caliph of the Messiah). After Hakeem Noor-ud-Din, the first caliph, the title of the Ahmadiyya caliph continued under Mirza Mahmud Ahmad, who led the community for over 50 years. Following him were Mirza Nasir Ahmad and then Mirza Tahir Ahmad who were the third and fourth caliphs respectively. The current caliph is Mirza Masroor Ahmad, who lives in London.

== Period of dormancy ==
Once the subject of intense conflict and rivalry among Muslim rulers, the caliphate lay dormant and largely unclaimed since the 1920s. For the majority of Muslims, the caliph, as leader of the ummah, "is cherished both as memory and ideal" as a time when Muslims "enjoyed scientific and military superiority globally". Muhammad is reported to have prophesied:

Prophethood will remain with you for as long as Allah wills it to remain, then Allah will raise it up whenever he wills to raise it up. Afterwards, there will be a Caliphate that follows the guidance of Prophethood remaining with you for as long as Allah wills it to remain. Then, He will raise it up whenever He wills to raise it up. Afterwards, there will be a reign of violently oppressive rule and it will remain with you for as long as Allah wills it to remain. Then, there will be a reign of tyrannical rule and it will remain for as long as Allah wills it to remain. Then, Allah will raise it up whenever He wills to raise it up. Then, there will be a Caliphate that follows the guidance of Prophethood.

— As-Silsilah As-Sahihah, vol. 1, no. 5

=== Abu Issa caliphate (1993 – c. 2014) ===
A contemporary effort to re-establish the caliphate by supporters of armed jihad that predates Abu Bakr al-Baghdadi and the Islamic State and was much less successful, was "the forgotten caliphate" of Muhammad bin ʿIssa bin Musa al Rifaʿi ("known to his followers as Abu ʿIssa"). This "microcaliphate" was founded on 3 April 1993 on the Pakistan–Afghanistan border, when Abu Issa's small number of "Afghan Arabs" followers swore loyalty (bay'ah) to him. Abu Issa, was born in the city of Zarqa, Jordan and like his followers had come to Afghanistan to wage jihad against the Soviets. Unlike them he had ancestors in the tribe of Quraysh, a traditional requirement for a caliph. The caliphate was ostensibly an attempt to unite the other jihadis who were not his followers and who were quarrelling among each other. It was not successful. Abu Issa's efforts to compel them to unite under his command were met "with mockery and then force". Local Afghans also despised him and his followers. Like the later Islamic State he tried to abolish infidel currency and rejected nationalism. According to scholar Kevin Jackson,

Abu ʿIssa issued 'sad and funny' fatwas, as Abu al-Walid puts it, notably sanctioning the use of drugs. A nexus had been forged between [Abu Issa's group] and local drug smugglers. (The fatwa led one jihadist author to dismiss Abu Issa as the 'caliph of the Muslims among drug traffickers and takfir') Abu ʿIssa also prohibited the use of paper currency and ordered his men to burn their passports.

The territory under his control "did not extend beyond a few small towns" in Afghanistan's Kunar province. Eventually he did not even control this area after the Taliban took it over in the late 1990s. The caliphate then moved to London, where they "preach[ed] to a mostly skeptical jihadi intelligentsia about the obligation of establishing a caliphate". They succeeded in attracting some jihadis, such as Yahya al-Bahrumi and Abu Umar al-Kuwaiti, both of whom would end up joining the Islamic State. Abu Issa died in 2014, "after spending most of his final years in prison in London". Abu Umar al-Kuwaiti became a judge for the Islamic State but was later executed for extremism after he "took takfir to new levels ... pronouncing death sentences for apostasy on those who were ignorant of scripture – and then pronouncing takfir on those too reluctant to pronounce takfir."

=== Islamic State (2014–present) ===
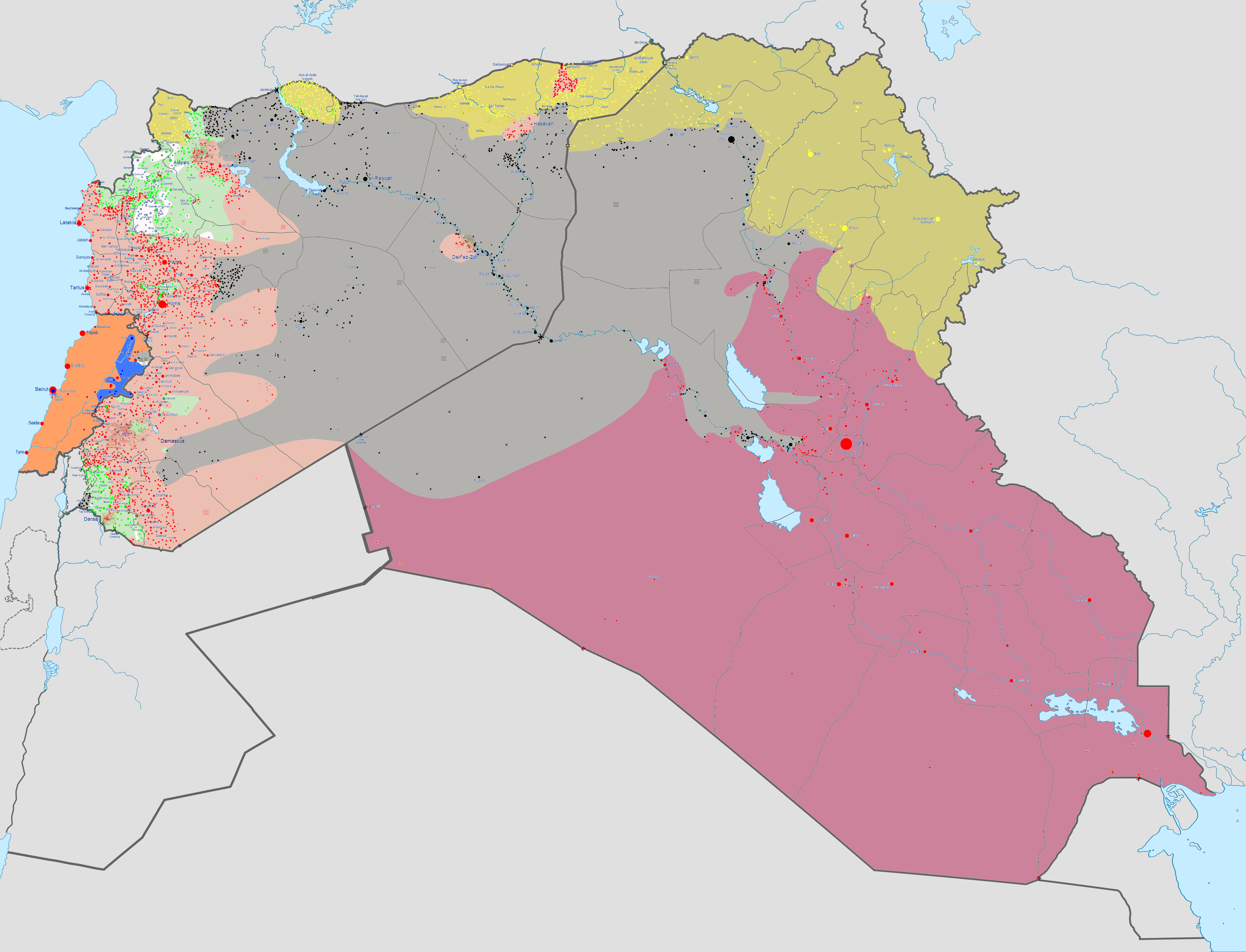
ISIL's territory, in grey, at the time of its greatest territorial extent in May 2015

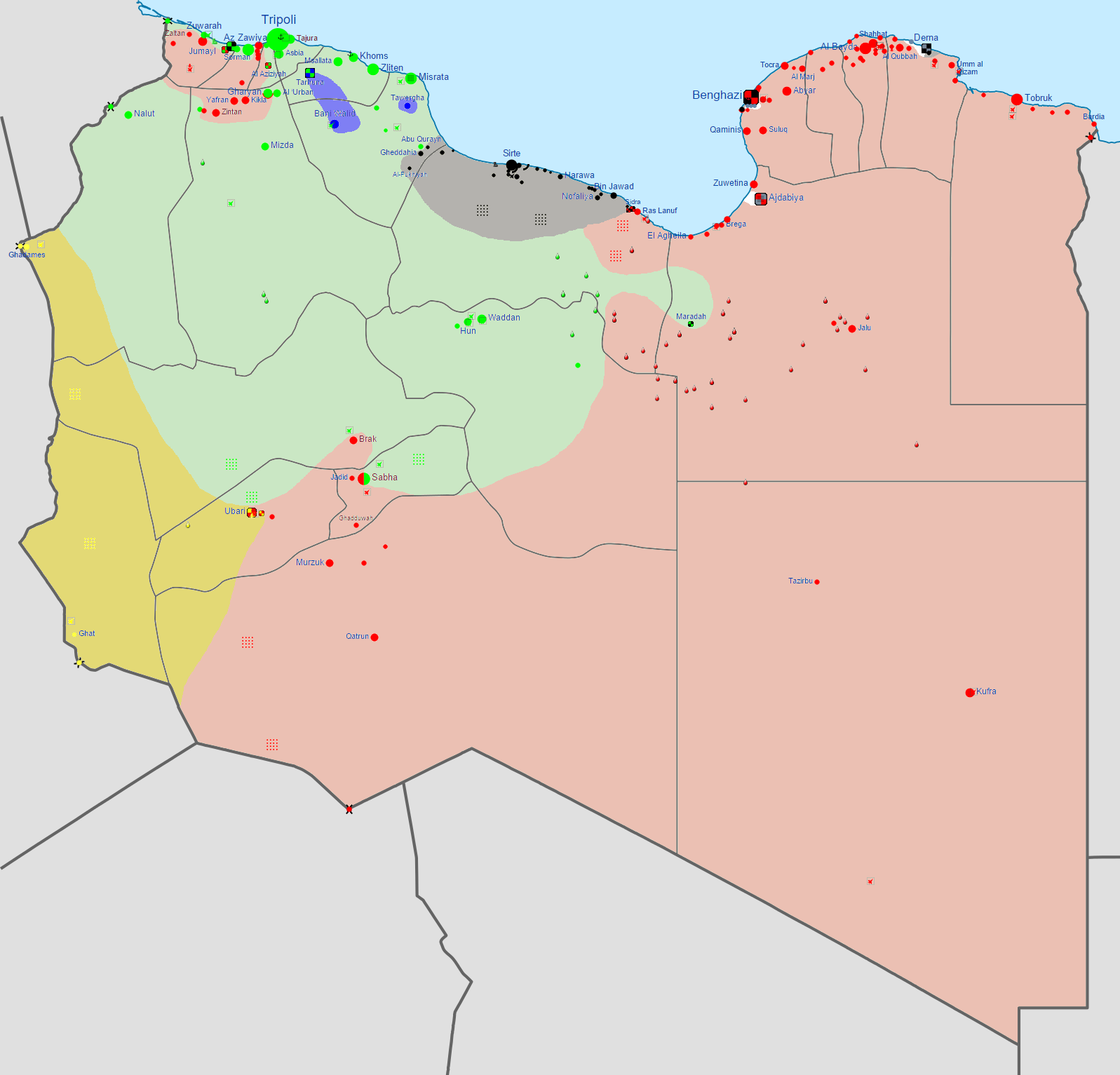
Military situation in Libya in early 2016: Ansar al-Sharia Islamic State

A network of Islamist militants formed the Al-Qaeda in Iraq affiliate during the Iraq War (2003–2011). The group eventually expanded into Syria and rose to prominence as the Islamic State of Iraq and the Levant (ISIL) during the Syrian Civil War. In the summer of 2014, the group launched the Northern Iraq offensive, seizing the city of Mosul. The group declared itself a caliphate under Abu Bakr al-Baghdadi on 29 June 2014 and renamed itself as the "Islamic State". ISIL's claim to be the highest authority of Muslims has been widely rejected. No prominent Muslim scholar has supported its declaration of caliphate; even Salafi jihadist preachers accused the group of engaging in political showmanship and bringing disrepute to the notion of Islamic state.

ISIL has been at war with armed forces including the Iraqi Army, the Syrian Army, the Free Syrian Army, Al-Nusra Front, Syrian Democratic Forces, and Iraqi Kurdistan's Peshmerga and People's Protection Units (YPG) along with a 60 nation coalition in its efforts to establish a de facto state on Iraqi and Syrian territory. At its height in 2014, the Islamic State held "about a third of Syria and 40 percent of Iraq". By December 2017 it had lost 95% of that territory, including Mosul, Iraq's second largest city, and the northern Syrian city of Raqqa, its capital. Its caliph, Al-Baghdadi, was killed in a raid by U.S. forces on 26 October 2019, its "last holdout", the town of Al-Baghuz Fawqani, fell to Syrian Democratic Forces on 23 March 2019.

=== Ahmadiyya view ===
The members of the Ahmadiyya community believe that the Ahmadiyya Caliphate is the continuation of the Islamic caliphate, first being the Rāshidūn (rightly guided) Caliphate (of Righteous Caliphs). This is believed to have been suspended with Ali, the son-in-law of Muhammad and re-established with the appearance of Mirza Ghulam Ahmad (1835–1908, the founder of the movement) whom Ahmadis identify as the Promised Messiah and Mahdi.

Ahmadis maintain that in accordance with Quranic verses (such as 24:55) and a number of ahadith on the issue, caliphates can only be established by God himself and is a divine blessing given to "those who believe and work righteousness" and uphold the unity of God, therefore any movement to establish the caliphates centered on human endeavours alone is bound to fail, particularly when the condition of the people diverges from the "precepts of prophethood" and they are as a result disunited, their inability to establish a caliphate caused fundamentally by the lack of righteousness in them. Although the caliph is elected, it is believed that God himself directs the hearts of believers towards an individual. Thus the caliph is designated neither necessarily by right (i.e. the rightful or competent one in the eyes of the people at that time) nor merely by election but primarily by God.

According to Ahmadiyya thought, a khalifa need not be the head of a state; rather the Ahmadiyya community emphasises the spiritual and organisational significance of the Khilāfah. It is primarily a religious/spiritual office, with the purpose of upholding, strengthening and spreading Islam and of maintaining the high spiritual and moral standards within the global community established by Muhammad—who was not merely a political leader but primarily a religious leader. If a khalifa does happen to bear governmental authority as a head of state, it is incidental and subsidiary in relation to his overall function as khalifa which is applicable to believers transnationally and not limited to one particular state.

Ahmadi Muslims believe that God has assured them that this caliphate will endure to the end of time, depending on their righteousness and faith in God. The Khalifa provides unity, security, moral direction and progress for the community. It is required that the Khalifa carry out his duties through consultation and taking into consideration the views of the members of the Shura (consultative body). However, it is not incumbent upon him to always accept the views and recommendations of the members. The Khalifatul Masih has overall authority for all religious and organisational matters and is bound to decide and act in accordance with the Qur'an and sunnah.

==== Islamist call ====
A number of Islamist political parties and mujahideen called for the restoration of the caliphate by uniting Muslim nations, either through political action (e.g. Hizb ut-Tahrir), or through force (e.g. al-Qaeda). Various Islamist movements gained momentum in recent years with the ultimate aim of establishing a caliphate. In 2014, ISIL/ISIS made a claim to re-establishing the caliphate. Those advocating the re-establishment of a caliphate differed in their methodology and approach. Some were locally oriented, mainstream political parties that had no apparent transnational objectives.

Abul A'la Maududi believed the caliph was not just an individual ruler who had to be restored, but was man's representation of God's authority on Earth:

Khilafa means representative. Man, according to Islam is the representative of "people", His (God's) viceregent; that is to say, by virtue of the powers delegated to him, and within the limits prescribed by the Qu'ran and the teaching of the prophet, the caliph is required to exercise Divine authority.

The Muslim Brotherhood advocates pan-Islamic unity and the implementation of Islamic law. Founder Hassan al-Banna wrote about the restoration of the caliphate.

One transnational group whose ideology was based specifically on restoring the caliphate as a pan-Islamic state is Hizb ut-Tahrir (literally, 'Party of Liberation'). It is particularly strong in Central Asia and Europe and is growing in strength in the Arab world. It is based on the claim that Muslims can prove that God exists and that the Qur'an is the word of God. Hizb ut-Tahrir's stated strategy is a non-violent political and intellectual struggle.

In Southeast Asia, groups such as Jemaah Islamiyah aimed to establish a Caliphate across Indonesia, Malaysia, Brunei and parts of Thailand, the Philippines and Cambodia.

=== Al-Qaeda's caliphate goals ===
Al-Qaeda has as one of its clearly stated goals the re-establishment of a caliphate. Its former leader, Osama bin Laden, called for Muslims to "establish the righteous caliphate of our umma". Al-Qaeda chiefs released a statement in 2005, under which, in what they call "phase five" there will be "an Islamic state, or caliphate". Al-Qaeda has named its Internet newscast from Iraq "The Voice of the Caliphate". According to Lawrence Wright, Ayman al-Zawahiri, bin Laden's mentor and al-Qaeda's second-in-command until 2011, once "sought to restore the caliphate... which had formally ended in 1924 following the dissolution of the Ottoman Empire but which had not exercised real power since the thirteenth century." Zawahiri believes that once the caliphate is re-established, Egypt would become a rallying point for the rest of the Islamic world, leading the jihad against the West. "Then history would make a new turn, God willing", Zawahiri later wrote, "in the opposite direction against the empire of the United States and the world's Jewish government".

=== Opposition ===
Scholar Olivier Roy writes that "early on, Islamists replace the concept of the caliphate ... with that of the emir." There were a number of reasons including "that according to the classical authors, a caliph must be a member of the tribe of the Prophet (the Quraysh) ... moreover, caliphs ruled societies that the Islamists do not consider to have been Islamic (the Ottoman Empire)." This is not the view of some Islamist groups; for example, both the Muslim Brotherhood and Hizb ut-Tahrir consider the Ottoman Empire to have been a caliphate.

== Religious basis ==
=== Quran ===
The Quran uses the term khalifa twice. First, in Surah Al-Baqara 2:30, it refers to God creating humanity as his khalifa on Earth. Second, in Surah Sad 38:26, it addresses King David as God's khalifa and reminds him of his obligation to rule with justice.

In addition, the following excerpt from the Quran, known as the 'Istikhlaf Verse', is used by some to argue for a Quranic basis for a caliphate:

Allah has promised those of you who believe and do good that He will certainly make them successors in the land, as He did with those before them; and will surely establish for them their faith which He has chosen for them; and will indeed change their fear into security—˹provided that˺ they worship Me, associating nothing with Me. But whoever disbelieves after this ˹promise˺, it is they who will be the rebellious.

— Surah An-Nur 24:55

Several schools of jurisprudence and thought within Sunni Islam argue that to govern a state by Sharia is, by definition, to rule via the caliphate and use the following verses to sustain their claim.

And judge between them ˹O Prophet˺ by what Allah has revealed, and do not follow their desires. And beware, so they do not lure you away from some of what Allah has revealed to you. If they turn away ˹from Allah's judgment˺, then know that it is Allah's Will to repay them for some of their sins, and that many people are indeed rebellious.

— Surah Al-Ma'idah 5:49

O believers! Obey Allah and obey the Messenger and those in authority among you. Should you disagree on anything, then refer it to Allah and His Messenger, if you ˹truly˺ believe in Allah and the Last Day. This is the best and fairest resolution.

— Surah An-Nisa 4:59

=== Hadith ===
The following hadith from Musnad Ahmad ibn Hanbal can be understood to prophesy two eras of the caliphate (both on the lines/precepts of prophethood).

Hadhrat Huzaifa narrated that the Messenger of Allah said: Prophethood will remain among you as long as Allah wills. Then Caliphate (Khilafah) on the lines of Prophethood shall commence, and remain as long as Allah wills. Then corrupt/erosive monarchy would take place, and it will remain as long as Allah wills. After that, despotic kingship would emerge, and it will remain as long as Allah wills. Then, the Caliphate (Khilafah) shall come once again based on the precept of Prophethood.

In the above, the first era of the caliphate is commonly accepted by Muslims to be that of the Rashidun Caliphate.

Nafi'a reported saying:

It has been reported on the authority of Nafi, that 'Abdullah b. Umar paid a visit to Abdullah b. Muti' in the days (when atrocities were perpetrated on the People Of Medina) at Harra in the time of Yazid b. Mu'awiya. Ibn Muti' said: Place a pillow for Abu 'Abd al-Rahman (family name of 'Abdullah b. 'Umar). But the latter said: I have not come to sit with you. I have come to you to tell you a tradition I heard from the Messenger of Allah. I heard him say: One who withdraws his band from obedience (to the Amir) will find no argument (in his defence) when he stands before Allah on the Day of Judgment, and one who dies without having bound himself by an oath of allegiance (to an Amir) will die the death of one belonging to the days of Jahiliyyah.

— Sahih Muslim 1851a

Hisham ibn Urwah reported on the authority of Abu Saleh on the authority of Abu Hurairah that Muhammad said:

Leaders will take charge of you after me, where the pious (one) will lead you with his piety and the impious (one) with his impiety, so only listen to them and obey them in everything which conforms with the truth (Islam). If they act rightly it is for your credit, and if they acted wrongly it is counted for you and against them.

It has been narrated on the authority of Abu Huraira that the Prophet of Allah said:

A Imam is a shield for them. They fight behind him and they are protected by (him from tyrants and aggressors). If he enjoins fear of God, the Exalted and Glorious, and dispenses justice, there will be a (great) reward for him; and if he enjoins otherwise, it redounds on him.

— Sahih Muslim 1841

Narrated Abu Huraira:

The Prophet said, "The Israelis used to be ruled and guided by prophets: Whenever a prophet died, another would take over his place. There will be no prophet after me, but there will be Caliphs who will increase in number." The people asked, "O Allah's Messenger! What do you order us (to do)?" He said, "Obey the one who will be given the pledge of allegiance first. Fulfil their (i.e. the Caliphs) rights, for Allah will ask them about (any shortcoming) in ruling those Allah has put under their guardianship."

— Sahih al-Bukhari 3455

=== Prophesied caliphate of the Mahdi ===
Many Islamic texts, including several ahadith, state that the Mahdi will be elected caliph and rule over a caliphate. A number of Islamic figures titled themselves both "caliph" and "al-Mahdi", including the first Abbasid caliph As-Saffah.

=== The Sahaba of Muhammad ===
Al-Habbab Ibn ul-Munthir said, when the Sahaba met in the wake of the death of Muhammad, (at the thaqifa hall) of Bani Sa’ida:

Let there be one Amir from us and one Amir from you (meaning one from the Ansar and one from the Mohajireen).

Upon this Abu Bakr replied:

It is forbidden for Muslims to have two Amirs (rulers)...

Then he got up and addressed the Muslims.

It has additionally been reported that Abu Bakr went on to say on the day of Al-Saqifa:

It is forbidden for Muslims to have two Amirs for this would cause differences in their affairs and concepts, their unity would be divided and disputes would break out among them. The Sunnah would then be abandoned, the bida'a (innovations) would spread and Fitna would grow, and that is in no one's interests.

The Sahaba agreed to this and selected Abu Bakr as their first Khaleef. Habbab ibn Mundhir who suggested the idea of two Ameers corrected himself and was the first to give Abu Bakr the Bay'ah. This indicates an Ijma as-Sahaba of all of the Sahaba. Ali ibni abi Talib, who was attending the body of Muhammad at the time, also consented to this.

Imam Ali whom the Shia revere said:

People must have an Amir...where the believer works under his Imara (rule) and under which the unbeliever would also benefit, until his rule ended by the end of his life (ajal), the booty (fay’i) would be gathered, the enemy would be fought, the routes would be made safe, the strong one will return what he took from the weak till the tyrant would be contained, and not bother anyone.

=== Views of Islamic theologians ===
Scholars like Al-Mawardi, Ibn Hazm, Ahmad al-Qalqashandi, and Al-Sha`rani stated that the global Muslim community can have only one leader at any given time. Al-Nawawi and Abd al-Jabbar ibn Ahmad declared it impermissible to give oaths of loyalty to more than one leader.

Al-Joziri said:

The Imams (scholars of the four schools of thought)- may Allah have mercy on them- agree that the Caliphate is an obligation, and that the Muslims must appoint a leader who would implement the injunctions of the religion, and give the oppressed justice against the oppressors. It is forbidden for Muslims to have two leaders in the world whether in agreement or discord.

Shia scholars have expressed similar opinions. However, the Shia school of thought states that the leader must not be appointed by the Islamic ummah, but must be appointed by God.

Al-Qurtubi said that the caliph is the "pillar upon which other pillars rest", and said of the Quranic verse, "Indeed, man is made upon this earth a Caliph":

This Ayah is a source in the selection of an Imaam, and a Khaleef, he is listened to and he is obeyed, for the word is united through him, and the Ahkam (laws) of the Caliph are implemented through him, and there is no difference regarding the obligation of that between the Ummah ...

An-Nawawi said:

(The scholars) consented that it is an obligation upon the Muslims to select a Khalif

Al-Ghazali when writing of the potential consequences of losing the caliphate said:

The judges will be suspended, the Wilayaat (provinces) will be nullified, ... the decrees of those in authority will not be executed and all the people will be on the verge of Haraam

Ibn Taymiyyah said:

It is obligatory to know that the office in charge of commanding over the people (ie: the post of the Khaleefah) is one of the greatest obligations of the Deen. In fact, there is no establishment of the Deen except by it....this is the opinion of the salaf, such as Al-Fuḍayl ibn ‘Iyāḍ, Ahmad ibn Hanbal and others

== Government ==
=== Electing or appointing a caliph ===
In his book The Early Islamic Conquests (1981), Fred Donner argues that the standard Arabian practice during the early caliphates was for the prominent men of a kinship group, or tribe, to gather after a leader's death and elect a leader from among themselves, although there was no specified procedure for this shura, or consultative assembly. Candidates were usually from the same lineage as the deceased leader, but they were not necessarily his sons. Capable men who would lead well were preferred over an ineffectual direct heir, as there was no basis in the majority Sunni view that the head of state or governor should be chosen based on lineage alone. Since the Umayyads, all caliphates have been dynastic.

=== Sunni belief ===
Following the death of Muhammad, a meeting took place at Saqifah. At that meeting, Abu Bakr was elected caliph by the Muslim community. Sunni Muslims developed the belief that the caliph is a temporal political ruler, appointed to rule within the bounds of Islamic law (Sharia). The job of adjudicating orthodoxy and Islamic law was left to mujtahids, legal specialists collectively called the Ulama. A number of Muslims call the first four caliphs the Rashidun, meaning the 'Rightly Guided', because they are believed to have followed the Qur'an and the sunnah of Muhammad.

Traditionally, Sunni Muslim madhhabs all agreed that a caliph must be a descendant of the Quraysh. This requirement had been stipulated by early Muslim scholars and posed no problem while the Umayyads and the Abbasids (who were members of the Quraysh) claimed the caliphate in the Sunni world. However, after the destruction of the Abbbasid Caliphate by the Mongols in 1258, some Sunni scholars, such as Al-Baqillani and Ibn Khaldun, argued that this was not a requirement for the caliphate and emphasized other requirements instead. The later claim of the Ottoman sultans to the caliphate, particularly when the Ottoman sultan Abdul Hamid II (r. 1876–1909) tried to formally appropriate the title, stoked controversy because they did not descend from Quraysh. The sultan's claim was not widely accepted beyond the Ottoman capital and was widely rejected in the Arabic-speaking world in particular.

=== Shia belief ===
With the exception of Zaidis, Shia Muslims believe in the Imamate, a principle by which rulers are imams who are divinely chosen, infallible and sinless and must come from the Ahl al-Bayt regardless of majority opinion, shura or election. They claim that before his death, Muhammad had given multiple indications, in the hadith of the pond of Khumm in particular, that he considered Ali, his cousin and son-in-law, as his successor. For the Twelvers, Ali and his eleven descendants, the Twelve Imams, are believed to have been considered, even before their birth, as the only valid Islamic rulers appointed and decreed by God. Shia Muslims believe that all the Muslim caliphs following Muhammad's death to be illegitimate due to their unjust rule and that Muslims have no obligation to follow them, as the only guidance that was left behind, as ordained in the hadith of the two weighty things, was the Islamic holy book, the Quran and Muhammad's family and offspring, who are believed to be infallible, therefore able to lead society and the Muslim community with complete justice and equity. Muhammad's own grandson, and third Shia imam, Hussain ibn Ali led an uprising against injustice and the oppressive rule of the Muslim caliph at the time at the Battle of Karbala. Shia Muslims emphasise that values of social justice, and speaking out against oppression and tyranny are not merely moral values, but values essential to a person's religiosity.

After these Twelve Imams, the potential caliphs, had passed, and in the absence of the possibility of a government headed by their imams, some Twelvers believe it was necessary that a system of Shi'i Islamic government based on the Guardianship of the Islamic Jurist be developed, due to the need for some form of government, where an Islamic jurist or faqih rules Muslims, suffices. However, this idea, developed by the marja' Ayatollah Ruhollah Khomeini and established in Iran, is not universally accepted among the Shia.

Ismailis believe in the Imamate principle mentioned above, but they need not be secular rulers as well.

- The Nizari continue to have a living imam; the current imam is the Aga Khan.
- The Taiyabi Ismaili have, since the year 1130, followed the imam's chief officer, the Dai al-Mutlaq, as they believe the imams are in a state of hiding.

=== Majlis al-Shura ===
The Majlis al-Shura (literally 'consultative assembly') was a representation of the idea of consultative governance. The importance of this is premised by the following verses of the Qur'an:

- "...who respond to their Lord, establish prayer, conduct their affairs by mutual consultation"(42:38)
- "...and consult with them in ˹conducting˺ matters. Once you make a decision, put your trust in Allah."(3:159)

The majlis is also the means to elect a new caliph. Al-Mawardi has written that members of the majlis should satisfy three conditions: they must be just, have enough knowledge to distinguish a good caliph from a bad one and have sufficient wisdom and judgement to select the best caliph. Al-Mawardi also said that in emergencies when there is no caliphate and no majlis, the people themselves should create a majlis and select a list of candidates for caliph; then the majlis should select a caliph from the list of candidates.

Some Islamist interpretations of the role of the Majlis al-Shura are the following: In an analysis of the shura chapter of the Qur'an, Islamist author Sayyid Qutb argues that Islam only requires the ruler to consult with some of the representatives of the ruled and govern within the context of the Sharia. Taqiuddin al-Nabhani, the founder of a transnational political movement devoted to the revival of the caliphate, writes that although the Shura is an important part of "the ruling structure" of the Islamic caliphate, "(it is) not one of its pillars", meaning that its neglect would not make a caliph's rule un-Islamic such as to justify a rebellion. However, the Muslim Brotherhood, the largest Islamic movement in Egypt, has toned down these Islamist views by accepting in principle that in the modern age the Majlis al-Shura is democracy.

=== Accountability of rulers ===
Al-Mawardi said that if the rulers meet their Islamic responsibilities to the public the people must obey their laws, but a caliph or ruler who becomes either unjust or severely ineffective must be impeached via the Majlis al-Shura. Al-Juwayni argued that Islam is the goal of the ummah, so any ruler who deviates from this goal must be impeached. Al-Ghazali believed that oppression by a caliph is sufficient grounds for impeachment. Rather than just relying on impeachment, Ibn Hajar al-Asqalani stated that the people have an obligation to rebel if the caliph begins to act with no regard for Islamic law. Ibn Hajar al-Asqalani said that to ignore such a situation is haraam and those who cannot revolt from inside the caliphate should launch a struggle from outside. Al-Asqalani used two ayahs from the Qur'an to justify this:

And they (the sinners on qiyama) will say, "Our Lord! We obeyed our leaders and elite, but they led us astray from the ˹Right˺ Way. Our Lord! Give them double ˹our˺ punishment, and condemn them tremendously."

— Surah Al-Ahzab 33:67–68

Islamic lawyers commented that when the rulers refuse to step down after being impeached through the Majlis, becoming dictators through the support of a corrupt army, if the majority is in agreement they have the option to launch a revolution. Some noted that this option is to be exercised only after factoring in the potential cost of life.

=== Rule of law ===
The following hadith establishes the principle of rule of law in relation to nepotism and accountability

Narrated ‘Aisha: The people of Quraish worried about the lady from Bani Makhzum who had committed theft. They asked, "Who will intercede for her with Allah's Apostle?" Some said, "No one dare to do so except Usama bin Zaid the beloved one to Allah's Apostle." When Usama spoke about that to Allah's Apostle; Allah's Apostle said: "Do you try to intercede for somebody in a case connected with Allah’s Prescribed Punishments?" Then he got up and delivered a sermon saying, "What destroyed the nations preceding you, was that if a noble amongst them stole, they would forgive him, and if a poor person amongst them stole, they would inflict Allah's Legal punishment on him. By Allah, if Fatima, the daughter of Muhammad (my daughter) stole, I would cut off her hand."

Various Islamic lawyers, however, place multiple conditions and stipulations on the execution of such a law, making it difficult to implement. For example, the poor cannot be penalised for stealing out of poverty, and during a time of drought in the Rashidun Caliphate, capital punishment was suspended until the effects of the drought passed.

Islamic jurists later formulated the concept that all classes were subject to the law of the land, and no person is above the law; officials and private citizens alike have a duty to obey the same law. Furthermore, a Qadi (Islamic judge) was not allowed to discriminate on the grounds of religion, race, colour, kinship or prejudice. In a number of cases, caliphs had to appear before judges as they prepared to render their verdict.

According to Noah Feldman, a law professor at Harvard University, the system of legal scholars and jurists responsible for the rule of law was replaced by the codification of Sharia by the Ottoman Empire in the early nineteenth century:

=== Economy ===
During the Muslim Agricultural Revolution, the caliphate understood that real incentives were needed to increase productivity and wealth and thus enhance tax revenues. A social transformation took place as a result of changing land ownership giving individuals of any gender, ethnic or religious background the right to buy, sell, mortgage and inherit land for farming or any other purpose. Signatures were required on contracts for every major financial transaction concerning agriculture, industry, commerce and employment. Copies of the contract were usually kept by both parties involved.

Early forms of proto-capitalism and free markets were present in the caliphate, since an early market economy and early form of merchant capitalism developed between the 8th and 12th centuries, which some refer to as "Islamic capitalism". A vigorous monetary economy developed based on the circulation of a stable high-value currency (the dinar) and the integration of previously independent monetary areas. Business techniques and forms of business organisation employed during this time included early contracts, bills of exchange, long-distance international trade, early forms of partnership (mufawada) such as limited partnerships (mudaraba) and early forms of credit, debt, profit, loss, capital (al-mal), capital accumulation (nama al-mal), circulating capital, capital expenditure, revenue, cheques, promissory notes, trusts (waqf), startup companies, savings accounts, transactional accounts, pawning, loaning, exchange rates, bankers, money changers, ledgers, deposits, assignments, the double-entry bookkeeping system, and lawsuits. Organisational enterprises similar to corporations independent from the state also existed in the medieval Islamic world. A number of these concepts were adopted and further advanced in medieval Europe from the thirteenth century onwards.

Early Islamic law included collection of zakat (charity), one of the Five Pillars of Islam, since the time of the first Islamic State, established by Muhammad at Medina. The taxes (including zakat and jizya) collected in the treasury (Bayt al-mal) of an Islamic government were used to provide income for the needy, including the poor, elderly, orphans, widows and the disabled. During the caliphate of Abu Bakr, a number of the Arab tribes, who had accepted Islam at the hand of Muhammad, rebelled and refused to continue to pay the Zakat, leading to the Ridda Wars. Caliph Umar added to the duties of the state an allowance, paid on behalf of every man woman and child, starting at birth, creating the world's first state run social welfare program.

Maya Shatzmiller states that the demographic behaviour of medieval Islamic society varied in some significant respects from other agricultural societies. Nomadic groups within places like the deserts of Egypt and Morocco maintained high birth rates compared to rural and urban populations, though periods of extremely high nomadic birth rates seem to have occurred in occasional "surges" rather than on a continuous basis. Individuals living in large cities had much lower birth rates, possibly due to the use of birth control methods and political or economic instability. This led to population declines in some regions. While several studies have shown that Islamic scholars enjoyed a life expectancy of 59–75 years between the eleventh and thirteenth centuries, the overall life expectancy of men in the same societies was lower. Factoring in infant mortality, Lawrence Conrad estimates the average lifespan in the early Islamic caliphate to be above 35 years for the general population, compared to around 40 years for the population of Classical Greece and 31 years for the population of thirteenth-century England.

The early Islamic Empire also had the highest literacy rates among pre-modern societies, alongside the city of classical Athens in the fourth century BC, and later, China after the introduction of printing from the tenth century. One factor for the relatively high literacy rates in the early Islamic Empire was its parent-driven educational marketplace, as the state did not systematically subsidise educational services until the introduction of state funding under Nizam al-Mulk in the eleventh century. Another factor was the diffusion of paper from China, which led to an efflorescence of books and written culture in Islamic society; thus papermaking technology transformed Islamic society from an oral to scribal culture, comparable to the later shifts from scribal to typographic culture, and from typographic culture to the Internet. Other factors include the widespread use of paper books in Islamic society (more so than any other previously existing society), the study and memorisation of the Quran, flourishing commercial activity and the emergence of the Maktab and Madrasah educational institutions.

== See also ==
- List of caliphs
- Caliphate of Abu bakr
- Al-Muhajiroun
- Amir al-Mu'minin
- Caliphate (TV series)
- The Caliphate or the Supreme Imamate (book)
- Khanate
- Shah
- Shaykh al-Islām
- Territory of the Islamic State
- Imamate in Shia doctrine
