= Yamama =

Yamama may refer to the following places:

- Al-Yamama, a historical region in present-day central Saudi Arabia
- Al Yamamah University, a university in Riyadh, Saudi Arabia
- Al Yamamah, an Arabic weekly published in Saudi Arabia
- Al-Yamamah arms deal, a series of arms deals between Saudi Arabia and the United Kingdom
- Yamama, Morocco, a neighborhood in the city of Marrakesh
- Abdel-Sanad Yamama, Egyptian politician
