= Maya Shatzmiller =

Economic historian

Maya Shatzmiller FRSC is a historian that specializes on the economic history of the Muslim world. She became a Fellow of the Royal Society of Canada in 2003. She received her PhD from the University of Provence in 1973, and was a visiting scholar at the Institute for Advanced Study in 1992. Shatzmiller is a professor of history at the University of Western Ontario.

Shatzmiller has critiqued the views of Timur Kuran, arguing that his scholarship paints a negative picture of Islam but does not show why some Muslim countries experience economic difficulties.

== Publications ==
- Shatzmiller, Maya. (1982). L'historiographie mérinide : Ibn Khaldūn et ses contemporains (in French). Brill. ISBN 90-04-06759-0. OCLC 9340971.
- Shatzmiller, Maya (1994). Labour in the Medieval Islamic World. Brill. ISBN 90-04-09896-8. OCLC 28256504.
- Shatzmiller, Maya (1999). The Berbers and the Islamic State: The Marīnid Experience in Pre-Protectorate Morocco. Markus Wiener Publishers. ISBN 1-55876-209-4. OCLC 42476115.
- Shatzmiller, Maya (2007). Her Day in Court: Women's Property Rights in Fifteenth-Century Granada. Harvard University Press. ISBN 978-0-674-02501-1. OCLC 156229693.
