= Yamama, Morocco =

Yamama
- Neighborhood
- Location within Morocco
- Coordinates: 31°34′21″N 7°58′59″W
- Country: Morocco
- Region: Marrakesh-Safi
- Prefecture: Marrakesh
- Time zone: UTC+0 (WET)
  - Summer (DST): UTC+1 (WEST)

Yamama is a northern neighborhood of Marrakesh in the Marrakesh-Safi region of Morocco. It belongs to the arrondissement of Gueliz.
