= Abu 'Amr 'Uthman =

Hafsid Sultanate Caliph from 1435 to 1488

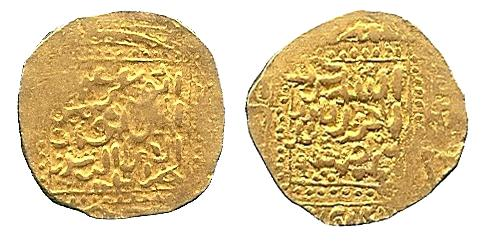
- Dinar coin of Uthman

Caliph of the Hafsid Sultanate
- Reign: September 1435 – September 1488
- Predecessor: al-Muntasir
- Successor: Abu Zakariya Yahya II
- Born: February 1419
- Died: September 1488 (aged 69); Hafsid Sultanate
Names
- Abu Amr Uthman ibn Abu al-Hasan Muhammad
- Dynasty: Hafsids
- Religion: Islam

Abu 'Amr 'Uthman (Arabic: أبو عمرو عثمان, romanized: Abū ʿAmr ʿUthmān; February 1419 – September 1488), regnal title al-Mutawakkil 'ala Allah (Arabic: المتوكل على الله, romanized: al-Mutawakkil ʿala Allāh, "he who relies on God") was the Hafsid ruler of Ifriqiya, or modern Tunisia, eastern Algeria and western Libya, who reigned between 1435 and 1488. A Flemish merchant who arrived at his court in Tunis in 1470 described him as tall, thoughtful, just, and pious, and called him the "greatest, most powerful, and richest of all Moorish princes." His reign was a period of relative stability and of military and diplomatic successes for the Hafsid kingdom. Uthman would prove to be the last effective Hafsid ruler, and the dynasty entered a long decline after his death until the Ottomans captured Tunis in 1574. Modern historian Jamil Abun-Nasr has called him the "last drop of Hafsid glory."

== Biography ==
=== Early life and succession ===
Uthman was born at the end of the month of Ramadan in the Hijri year 821, corresponding to early February, 1419. He was the grandson of Abu Faris Abd al-Aziz II, the Hafsid ruler from 1394 to 1434, and the son of Abu Faris's original heir Abu Abdullah Muhammad al-Mansur, who died in 1430, by a Valencian concubine named Riʾm.

Abu Faris died in 1434 and was succeeded by his grandson and Uthman's full brother al-Muntasir, who appointed the fifteen-year-old Uthman as the governor of Constantine. Al-Muntasir soon fell ill. In early 1435, the king's reign was shaken by a rebellion by the Arab tribe of the Awlad Abi-l-Layl, which had to be suppressed by the teenage Uthman with the aid of a rival Arab tribe, the Awlad Mulalhil. The threat having been suppressed, al-Muntasir succumbed to his illness on September 16, 1435, and passed the throne to his younger brother.

=== Early reign (1435—1453) ===
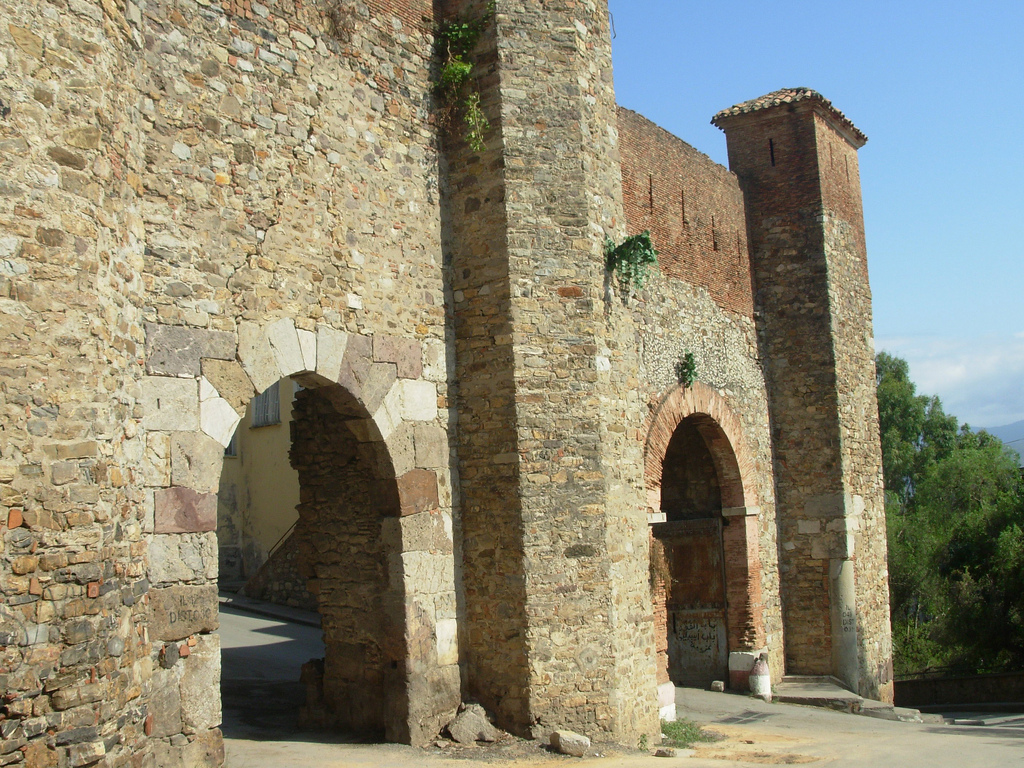
Citadel in Bejaia

Uthman's succession to the throne, like most transfers of power in Hafsid history, was initially troubled. Abu Faris's brother and the new king's great-uncle, a faqih named Abu Abdallah Muhammad al-Husain, attempted to rally the Awlad Abi-l-Layl in another rebellion, but the tribe handed him over to Uthman, who probably executed him, in November 1435. A more serious threat was posed by his uncle Abu-l-Hasan Ali, another son of Abu Faris who had been appointed by al-Muntasir as the governor of Béjaïa. In the spring of 1436, Abu-l-Hasan won the support of the Awlad Abi-l-Layl in his bid for the Hafsid throne. The rebels laid siege to Constantine for a month and even reached the walls of the capital of Tunis itself. The initial rebellion was routed by Uthman and his Awlad Mulalhil supporters in a battle near the Roman ruins of Tipasa on October 4, 1436. Abu-l-Hasan fled back to Béjaïa.

In early 1437, the Awlad Abi-l-Layl chieftains were captured and brought in chains to the citadel of Tunis, but Abu-l-Hasan continued the rebellion, this time with the support of the tribes of Kabylia. The war in Kabylia continued for two years until the Kabylian chieftain, Abdallah ibn Umar ibn Sahr, was killed in June 1439. On November 9 of that year, Uthman's troops captured Béjaïa for the first time, where Abu-l-Hasan had minted currency in his own name and otherwise took on the trappings of a legitimate Islamic monarchy. But the rebel uncle successfully escaped and continued an insurgency for more than a dozen years, recapturing Béjaïa for about three weeks in 1446 and besieging it again in 1452. In that very year, however, he was betrayed by his allies in Kabylia and brought to Constantine as a captive. He was quickly executed and his head presented to Uthman.

In the 1440s, Uthman also personally engaged in military campaigns towards the south, against the autonomous inland towns of Nefta and Touggourt, and subdued them to central control. A Florentian mission to Tunis in 1446 praised the remarkable peace and security of the North African interior that the king had brought about through these wars.

Diplomatically, Uthman encouraged European merchants to visit Ifriqiya by promising them the same justice that his own Muslim subjects would receive, and worked for amicable relations with the Christian Mediterranean powers. Lengthy negotiations with King Alfonso V of Aragon over Christian-Muslim piracy and slaving expeditions in the Mediterranean almost concluded in a treaty in which Uthman and Alfonso would agree to repatriate all captives from each other's realms to their homelands. However, negotiations were derailed by the murder of two Christians in the Hafsid realm and the capture of Muslims by Maltese Christians. No treaty was ultimately signed. Nonetheless, an informal agreement appears to have been made at some point, as Alfonso ordered the return of cargo taken by Christians from a Hafsid ship in 1453. He also renewed and expanded treaties with the Italian republics of Venice and Genoa in 1438 and 1444 respectively, granting the latter a license to import large qualities of North African grain. New treaties were also signed with Florence and—following a 1443 incident in which pirates from Ifriqiya briefly captured Elba—with Piombino.

In terms of internal governance, Uthman refrained from giving high office to fellow Hafsid dynasts and generally appointed royal retainers, often renegade Europeans, as qaids or provincial governors. The sole exception was Béjaïa, which was governed by one or another of the king's cousins from its capture in 1439 until Abu-l-Hasan's death in 1452, when a non-dynastic qaid took over. This was likely to weaken the appeal of the rebels in the public opinion of the city, which had long been governed directly by Hafsid princes. However, Uthman was not uniformly trusting of non-dynastic ministers; in 1453, he executed Nabil ibn Abi Qattaya, a minister who had dominated the court in the king's early reign to the point that the Italians knew him as "the first after the king", and confiscated his wealth.

=== Middle reign (1453—1470) ===
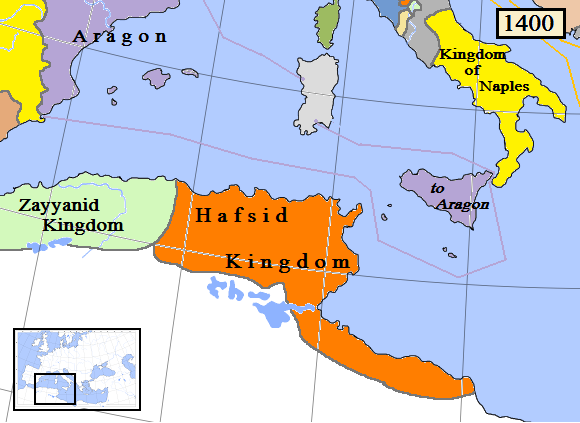
The Hafsid realm in 1400

The middle reign of 'Uthman featured an increased level of instability. Severe outbreaks of the bubonic plague in 1453 and 1468 killed as many hundreds of people in Tunis per day. In 1463, nomadic tribes in the North African interior, discontent with a decrease in the payments the Hafsid treasury customarily made to them, rose up against the throne. The tribes abandoned the rebellion without fighting when Uthman marched against them, but tribal elements continued to carry out raids that newly threatened the security of the North African interior that Uthman had formerly ensured in the 1440s.

The middle reign was also marked by military campaigns of conquest in North Africa. He conquered Tripolitania in 1458 and appointed a central governor in the Saharan town of Ouargla in 1463. When Abu Abdallah ibn Abi Zayyan seized the throne of the Zayyanid kingdom of Tlemcen in 1462, usurping the previous pro-Hafsid ruler, Uthman intervened and forced Abu Abdallah to accept him as his suzerain. When Abu Abdallah proved disloyal and attempted to ally with the insurgent tribes in the interior, Uthman launched another campaign in 1466 that reaffirmed Hafsid dominance over Tlemcen. Even Muhammad al-Sheikh, the first Wattasid ruler of Morocco far to the west, became a vassal of Uthman.

Diplomatic rapports with other Mediterranean countries, both Muslim and Christian, continued. Unlike earlier Hafsids, Uthman remained largely uninterested in the security of the beleaguered Emirate of Granada, although friendly contacts between the two continued. He also maintained ties with the Mamluks, a traditional friend, and established new ones with the Ottomans, sending a mission in 1454 to congratulate the sultan Mehmed II for his capture of Constantinople. Amicable relations with the Italian states and with Aragon continued, despite a thirteen-year break in relations between Piombino when Uthman was convinced by merchants from rival Italian states to embargo them. Uthman sent a lion as a gift to Francesco I Sforza, the Duke of Milan.

'Uthman established hydraulic works for the city of Tunis in this period. He was also a pious Muslim and established many waqf foundations and zawiya institutes. As a patron of Sufism, he was also notable for his support of the saint and miracle-worker Sidi ibn Arus.

=== Late reign (1470—1488) ===
Sources for Uthman's reign following 1470 are rare. It is not known whether he continued to rule over Tlemcen following 1468, when a new ruler came to the throne, although it is known that the Wattasids of Morocco formally accepted Uthman's rule in 1472. In 1477, the king received the submission of a number of tribal chieftains.

Trade with the Italians appears to have grown, possibly with the rise of the Ottoman Empire making the Italian republics refocus their commercial enterprises to North Africa. There were some diplomatic troubles with Genoa, including the imprisonment of Genoese merchants by Hafsid provincial governors, but Genoa did not engage in military conflict because the Republic did not dare risk its grain imports from North Africa. A new commercial treaty was signed with the Kingdom of Naples, in southern Italy, in 1478. New and friendly relations were established with France, the County of Provence, and even the Crusader Knights Hospitalier, in which Uthman promised to send two trading vessels to the Crusader island of Rhodes annually.

In 1470, Uthman attempted to sign a treaty with Aragon in which the two kingdoms would agree to repatriate all captives and allow total freedom of trade between the two realms. This was unsuccessful and piracy between the two realms resumed, despite an attempt in 1479 by the notables of Palermo to sign an official peace with the Hafsids. The security of Sicily or the commercial economy of the port of Barcelona, both of which were adversely affected by bad relations with Uthman, was probably not of great interest to the Aragonese kings; John II of Aragon disliked Barcelona, which had rebelled against him, and his successor Ferdinand II was too preoccupied with the final conquest of Granada to pay relations with the Hafsids much heed. Despite the historical friendship between the Granadans and the Hafsids, Uthman did not respond to a 1487 mission from the former begging desperately for aid to save the kingdom from imminent demise.

== Succession struggles ==
In the closing years of his reign, Abu 'Amr 'Uthman suffered a series of untimely deaths in his family. His son Abu Salim Ibrahim died in 1484; his grandson al-Mustansir bin Mas'ud followed a few months later. Then Mas'ud himself, Abu 'Amr 'Uthman's oldest son, died in 1488. To secure the succession Abu 'Amr 'Uthman designated another of Mas'ud's sons, Abu-Zakariya Yahya II as his successor shortly before he himself died. Abu-Zakariya Yahya, aged thirty six, was serving as governor of Constantine at the time of his accession. Proclaimed in 1488, held power only until 1489, as a ruthless purge of his own relatives turned those who survived it against him. Abandoned by his troops he was killed in a battle that brought to power his cousin Abd-al-Mumin ibn Ibrahim, son of Abu Salim Ibrahim. Abd-al-Mumin ibn Ibrahim was no more successful in winning over support and was soon overthrown by the eighteen-year-old son of his predecessor, Abu Yahya Zakariya. Although Abu Yahya Zakariya succeeded in restoring peace and order, he was carried off by the plague in 1494 and succeeded by his grandson Abu Abdallah Muhammad IV al-Mutawakkil.

== Bibliography ==
- Brunschvig, Robert (1940). La Berbérie Orientale sous les Hafsides, des origines à la fin du XVe siècle [The Eastern Barbary Coast under the Hafsids, from their beginnings to the end of the fifteenth century] (in French). Paris: La librairie d'Amérique et d'Orient Adrien Maisonneuve.
- Fossier, Robert; Jacques Verger; Robert Mantran; Catherine Asdracha; Charles de La Roncière (1987). Storia del medioevo III: Il tempo delle crisi (1250–1520). Giulio Einaudi editore. p. 368. ISBN 88-06-58404-9.
- Abun-Nasr, Jamil M. (1987). A History of the Maghrib in the Islamic Period. Cambridge: Cambridge University Press.
