= Abu Faris Abd al-Aziz II =

Hafsid Sultanate Caliph from 1394 to 1434

Caliph of the Hafsid Sultanate
- Reign: June 1394 – July 1434
- Predecessor: Ahmad II
- Successor: Muhammad III
- Born: 1361
- Died: July 1434 (aged 72–73); Tlemcen
- Dynasty: Hafsids
- Religion: Islam

Abu Faris Abd al-Aziz II (Arabic: أبو فارس عبد العزيز المتوكل) (reigned 1394–1434) was a Hafsid Caliph of Ifriqiya.

== Life ==
He proceeded to further consolidate the kingdom after his father Abu al-Abbas Ahmad II had restored its integrity. A strong monarch and an orthodox Muslim, he abolished some taxes he deemed incompatible with the teachings of Qur'an, using instead privateer actions against Christian shipping as a way to raise state income. He intervened against his western neighbors, the Zayyanid dynasty of the Kingdom of Tlemcen, and in Andalusia as well.

== Military career ==
Beginning in 1404, he launched a military campaign in Libya, focusing on the Nafusa Mountains. Two years later, the campaign continued with the conquest of Derj and the launch of a Hafsid invasion of Ghadames. In the following year, he captured Matmata, and by 1410, he had brought the region of Nefzaoua under Hafsid control.

In 1413, they succeeded in conquering Algiers, which enabled them, from 1415 onward, to gain access to the Strait of Gibraltar, where they engaged in multiple naval battles against Portuguese fleets.

In 1431, he launched a military expedition against Tlemcen, during which he captured the local leader, Abou Abdallah Mohamed. He then undertook a campaign into what is now Morocco and pake marinid vassal of Tunis, and he returned to Tunis.

Ultimately, he was the one who completed the reunification of Ifriqiya under Hafsid authority. He brought several previously independent Arab dynasties under Hafsid control, including those ruling Béjaïa, Constantine, Tripoli, Gafsa, Tozeur, and Biskra.
